= List of commanders-in-chief of the Chilean Navy =

Commander-in-chief of the Chilean Navy
- Coat of arms of the Chilean Navy

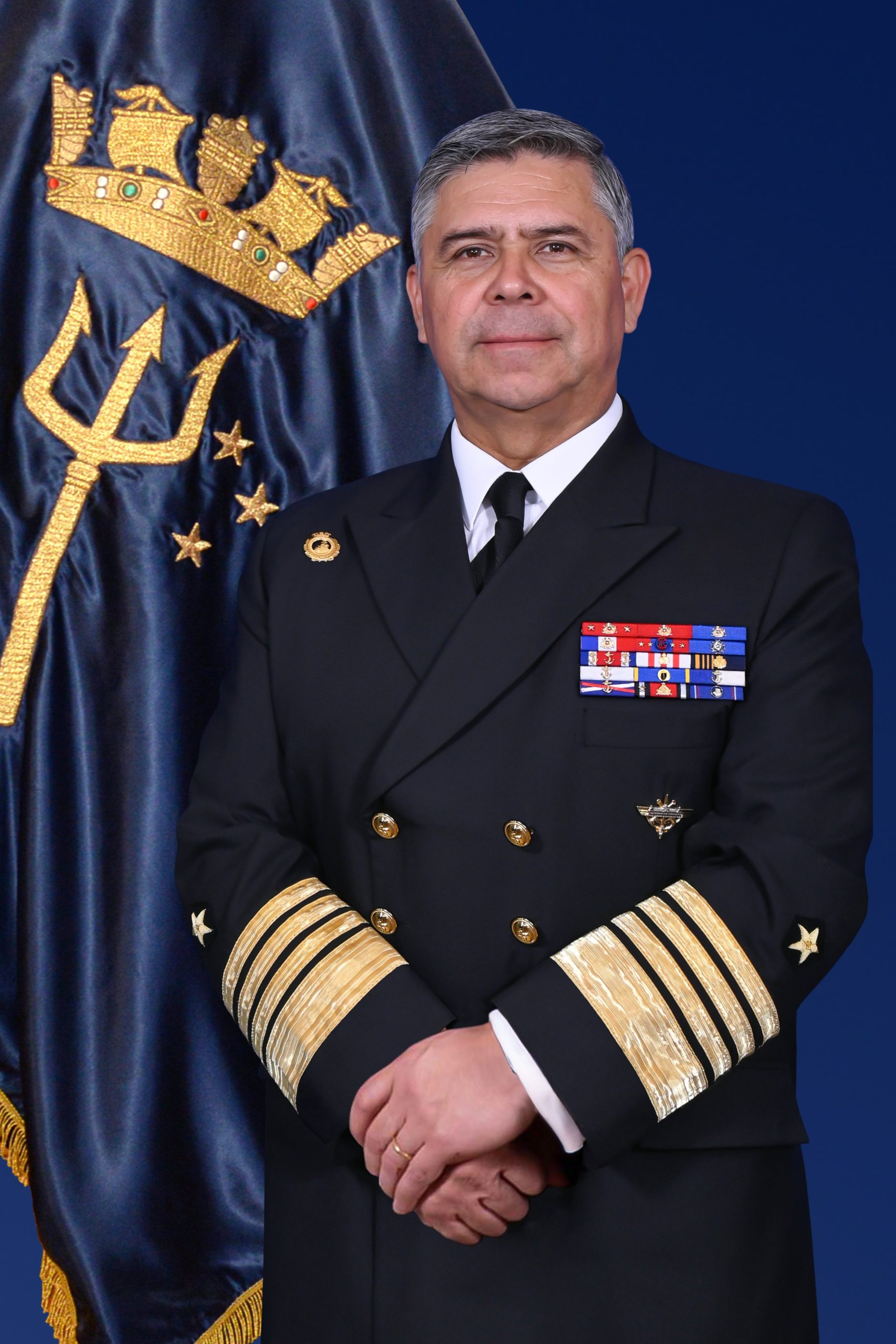
- Incumbent; Admiral Fernando Cabrera Salazar since 18 June 2025
- Chilean Navy
- Reports to: Chief of the Joint Chiefs of Defence
- Seat: Valparaíso
- Appointer: President of Chile
- Term length: 4 years
- Formation: 1817
- First holder: Rudecindo Alvarado

This article lists the commanders-in-chief of the Chilean Navy. The Chilean Navy (Spanish: Armada de Chile) is the naval force of Chile. The Chilean Navy dates back to 1817.

The current Commander-in-Chief is Admiral Fernando Cabrera Salazar. He was appointed by former President Gabriel Boric on 18 June 2025.

== List ==
=== Valparaíso governor (1812–1818) ===
No.	Picture	Valparaíso governor	Took office	Left office	Time in office
1	Francisco de la Lastra de la Sotta	Colonel; Francisco de la Lastra de la Sotta (1777–1852)	1812	1814	1–2 years
2	Rudecindo Alvarado	Lieutenant Colonel; Rudecindo Alvarado (1792–1852)	1817	1872	0 years
(1)	Francisco de la Lastra de la Sotta	Colonel; Francisco de la Lastra de la Sotta (1777–1852)	1817	1818	0–1 years

=== Navy General Commander (1818–1897) ===
Portrait	Rank	Name	Took office	Left office
	Navy Captain 1st Class	Manuel Blanco Encalada	1818	1821
	Colonel	José Ignacio Zenteno del Pozo	1821	1825
	General	Francisco de la Lastra de la Sotta	1825	1829
	Division General	José María de la Cruz Prieto	1829	1831
		José Matías López Orrego	1831	1833
	Colonel of Militia	Diego Portales Palazuelos	1833	1834
	Colonel	Ramón de la Cavareda Trucios	1834	1837
	Colonel	Victorino Garrido	1837	1842
	Division General	José María de la Cruz Prieto	1842	1843
	Commodore	Roberto Simpson Winthrop	1843	1844
	Division General	José Joaquín Prieto Vial	1844	1845
	Navy Captain	Roberto Winthrop Simpson	1845	1846
	General	José Santiago Aldunate Toro	1846	1847
	Vice Admiral	Manuel Blanco Encalada	1847	1852
	Rear Admiral	Roberto Simpson Winthrop	1852	1853
		Julián Riesco Droguett	1853	1856
		Domingo Espiñera Riesco	1856	1858
		Manuel Valenzuela Castillo	1858	1858
		Jovino Novoa Vidal	1859	1859
	General	Juan Vidaurre-Leal Morla	1859	1859
	Colonel	Cornelio Saavedra Rodríguez	1860	1860
	General	José Santiago Aldunate Toro	1861	1864
		Juan Ramón Lira	1864	1865
		Vicente Villalón	1865	1865
		Juan Ramón Lira	1865	1866
		José María de la Cruz Salvo	1867	1867
	Commodore	José Anacleto Goñi Prieto	1867	1868
		Juan Ramón Lira	1868	1868
	Commodore	José Anacleto Goñi Prieto	1869	1870
		Francisco Echaurren García-Huidobro	1870	1876
		Eulogio Altamirano Aracena	1876	1879
	Rear Admiral	José Anacleto Goñi Prieto	1879	1880
		Eulogio Altamirano Aracena	1880	1880
	Commodore	Óscar Viel y Toro	1881	1883
		Domingo Toro Herrera	1884	1885
	Rear Admiral	Juan José Latorre Benavente	1886	1887
	Rear Admiral	Luis Uribe Orrego	1887	1889
	Rear Admiral	Juan Williams Rebolledo	1890	1891
	Rear Admiral	Óscar Viel y Toro	1891	1891
	Rear Admiral	Francisco Javier Molinas Gacitúa	1892	1892
	Rear Admiral	Luis Anacleto Castillo Goñi	1893	1897

=== Navy General Director (1897–1927) ===
Portrait	Rank	Name	Took office	Left office
	Vice Admiral	Jorge Montt Álvarez	1897	1913
	Vice Admiral	Luis Alberto Goñi Simpson	1913	1916
	Vice Admiral	Lindor Pérez Gacitúa	1916	1916
	Vice Admiral	Joaquín Muñoz Hurtado	1916	1922
	Vice Admiral	Francisco Nef Jara	1922	1924
	Vice Admiral	Salustio Valdés Cortés	1924	1925
	Vice Admiral	Luis Langlois Vidal	1925	1925
	Vice Admiral	Juan Schroeder Peña	1925	1927

=== Navy Inspector General (1927–1932) ===
No.	Picture	Navy Inspector General	Took office	Left office	Time in office
1	José Toribio Merino Saavedra	Vice Admiral; José Toribio Merino Saavedra	1927	1928	0–1 years
2	Felipe Wiegand Rodríguez	Rear Admiral; Felipe Wiegand Rodríguez	1928	1929	0–1 years
3	Alejandro García Castelblanco	Rear Admiral; Alejandro García Castelblanco	1929	1930	0–1 years
4	Hipólito Marchant Morales	Vice Admiral; Hipólito Marchant Morales	1930	1931	0–1 years
(3)	Alejandro García Castelblanco	Rear Admiral; Alejandro García Castelblanco	1931	1931	0 years
(4)	Hipólito Marchant Morales	Vice Admiral; Hipólito Marchant Morales	1931	1932	0–1 years
5	Edgardo von Schröeders Sarratea	Rear Admiral; Edgardo von Schröeders Sarratea	1932	1932	0 years

=== Navy General Director (1932–1938) ===
No.	Picture	Navy General Director	Took office	Left office	Time in office
1	Carlos Jouanne	Rear Admiral; Carlos Jouanne	1932	1932	0 years
2	Luis Alvarez Jaramillo	Rear Admiral; Luis Alvarez Jaramillo	1932	1932	0 years
3	Calisto Rogers Ceas	Rear Admiral; Calisto Rogers Ceas	1932	1932	0 years
4	Olegario Reyes del Río	Vice Admiral; Olegario Reyes del Río	1932	1938	5–6 years

=== Navy Commander-in-chief (1938–present) ===
Portrait	Rank	Name	Took office	Left office
	Vice Admiral	Olegario Reyes del Río	1938	1938
	Vice Admiral	Luis Álvarez Jaramillo	1938	1938
	Vice Admiral	Julio Allard Pinto	1938	1943
	Vice Admiral	Vicente Merino Bielich	1943	1947
	Vice Admiral	Emilio Daroch Soto	1947	1948
	Vice Admiral	Carlos Torres Hevia	1948	1952
	Vice Admiral	Danilo Bassi Galleguillos	1952	1952
	Vice Admiral	Enrique Lagreze Echavarría	1952	1954
	Vice Admiral	Francisco O'Ryan Orrego	1954	1958
	Vice Admiral	Leopoldo Fontaine Nakin	1958	1962
	Admiral	Hernán Cubillos Leiva	1962	1964
	Admiral	Jacobo Neumann Etienne	1964	1966
	Admiral	Ramón Barros González	1966	1968
	Admiral	Fernando Porta Angulo	1968	16 October 1970
	Admiral	Hugo Tirado Barros	16 October 1970	3 November 1970
	Admiral	Raúl Montero Cornejo	1970	11 September 1973 (deposed)
	Admiral	José Toribio Merino	11 September 1973	8 March 1990
	Admiral	Jorge Martínez Busch	8 March 1990	14 November 1997
	Admiral	Jorge Arancibia Reyes	14 November 1997	18 June 2001
	Admiral	Miguel Ángel Vergara	18 June 2001	18 June 2005
	Admiral	Rodolfo Codina Díaz	18 June 2005	18 June 2009
	Admiral	Edmundo González Robles	18 June 2009	18 June 2013
	Admiral	Enrique Larrañaga Martín	18 June 2013	18 June 2017
	Admiral	Julio Leiva Molina	18 June 2017	18 June 2021
	Admiral	Juan Andrés de la Maza	18 June 2021	18 June 2025
	Admiral	Fernando Cabrera Salazar	18 June 2025	Incumbent

== See also ==
- Chilean Armed Forces
- Chief of the Joint Chiefs of Defence (Chile)
- List of commanders-in-chief of the Chilean Army
- List of commanders-in-chief of the Chilean Air Force
