= List of commanders-in-chief of the Chilean Army =

Commander-in-chief of the Chilean Army
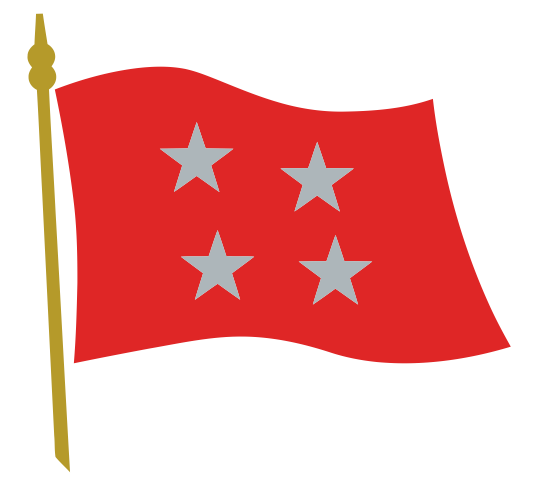
- Flag of the Commander-in-chief of the Chilean Army

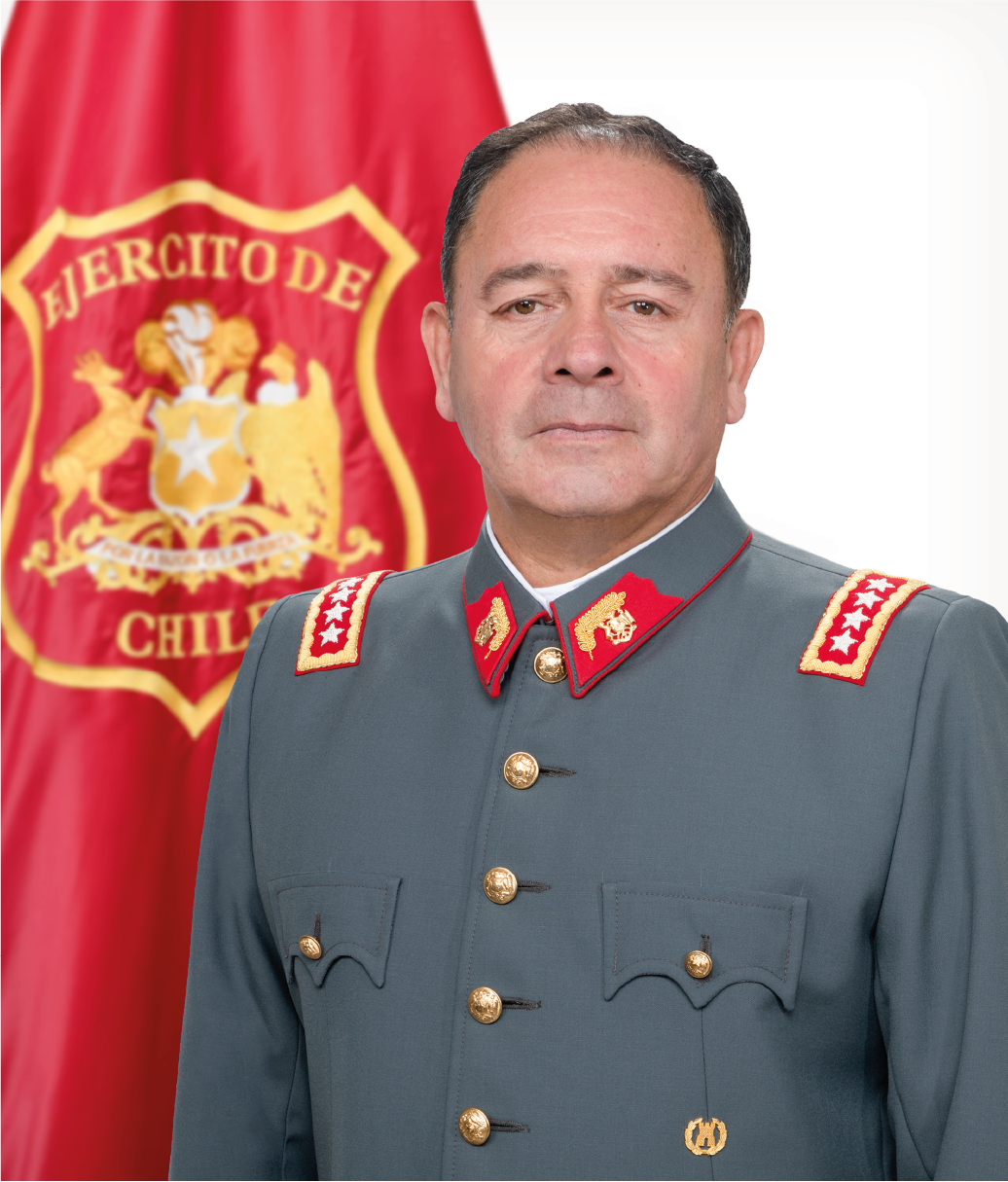
- Incumbent; Pedro Varela Sabando since 9 March 2026
- Chilean Army
- Reports to: Chief of the Joint Chiefs of Defence
- Seat: Santiago (commune)
- Appointer: President of Chile
- Term length: 4 years
- Formation: 31 March 1813
- First holder: José Miguel Carrera Verdugo
- Salary: CL$4,459,472

This article lists the commanders-in-chief of the Chilean Army. The Chilean Army (Spanish: Ejército de Chile) is the land force of Chile. The Chilean Army dates back to 1810.

The current Commander-in-Chief is Army General Pedro Varela Sabando. He was appointed by former President Gabriel Boric on 9 March 2026.

== Independence and national organization (1810–1830) ==
No.	Portrait	Name	Took office	Left office	Time in office
Army Commander-in-chief
1	José Miguel Carrera Verdugo	Brigadier; José Miguel Carrera Verdugo (1785–1821)	31 March 1813	23 November 1813	237 days
2	Bernardo O'Higgins Riquelme	Colonel; Bernardo O'Higgins Riquelme (1778–1842)	27 November 1813	2 September 1814	279 days
(1)	José Miguel Carrera Verdugo	Brigadier; José Miguel Carrera Verdugo (1785–1821)	28 August 1814	2 October 1814	35 days
3	José de San Martín Matorras	Captain General; José de San Martín Matorras (1778–1850)	5 June 1817	27 April 1819	1 year, 326 days
(2)	Bernardo O'Higgins Riquelme	Captain General; Bernardo O'Higgins Riquelme (1778–1842)	27 April 1819	28 January 1823	3 years, 276 days
4	Ramón Freire Serrano	Captain General; Ramón Freire Serrano (1787–1851)	21 February 1823	2 April 1830	7 years, 40 days

== Conservative and liberal republics (1830–1891) ==
No.	Portrait	Name	Took office	Left office	Time in office
Army Commander-in-chief
1	José Joaquín Prieto Vial	Divisional General; José Joaquín Prieto Vial (1830–1894)	2 April 1830	18 September 1841	11 years, 169 days
2	Manuel Bulnes Prieto	Divisional General; Manuel Bulnes Prieto (1799–1866)	18 September 1841	18 October 1866 †	25 years, 30 days
Senior General Officer
3	Marcos Maturana del Campo	Divisional General; Marcos Maturana del Campo (1802–1871)	18 October 1866	21 December 1870	4 years, 64 days
4	Juan Jarpa [es]	Divisional General; Juan Jarpa (1804–1876)	8 August 1871	31 December 1875	4 years, 145 days
5	Basilio Urrutia [es]	Divisional General; Basilio Urrutia (1816–1881)	31 December 1875	7 April 1879	3 years, 97 days
Field Commander-in-chief
6	Justo Arteaga Cuevas	Divisional General; Justo Arteaga Cuevas (1805–1882)	8 April 1879	18 July 1879	101 days
7	Erasmo Escala Arriagada	Divisional General; Erasmo Escala Arriagada (1826–1884)	18 July 1879	28 March 1880	254 days
8	Manuel Baquedano González	Divisional General; Manuel Baquedano González (1823–1897)	3 April 1880	3 May 1881	1 year, 30 days
Inspector General
9	Cornelio Saavedra Rodríguez	Divisional General; Cornelio Saavedra Rodríguez (1821–1891)	3 May 1881	19 December 1883	2 years, 230 days
10	Emilio Sotomayor Baeza	Divisional General; Emilio Sotomayor Baeza (1826–1894)	4 January 1884	22 August 1888	4 years, 231 days
Field Commander-in-chief
11	José Francisco Gana Castro	Divisional General; José Francisco Gana Castro (1828–1894)	22 August 1888	4 September 1891	3 years, 13 days

== Parliamentary republic (1891–1925) ==
No.	Portrait	Inspector General	Took office	Left office	Time in office
1	Marco Aurelio Arriagada [es]	Divisional General; Marco Aurelio Arriagada (1830–1894)	14 September 1891	28 August 1894 †	2 years, 348 days
2	Adolfo Holley Urzúa	Divisional General; Adolfo Holley Urzúa (1833–1914)	28 August 1894	13 October 1900	6 years, 46 days
3	Emilio Korner	Divisional General; Emilio Korner (1846–1920)	13 October 1900	19 April 1910	9 years, 188 days
4	Jorge Boonen Rivera	Divisional General; Jorge Boonen Rivera (1858–1921)	19 April 1910	26 April 1921	11 years, 7 days
5	Arístides Pinto Concha [es]	Divisional General; Arístides Pinto Concha (1859–1924)	26 April 1921	13 February 1922	293 days
6	Luis Altamirano Talavera	Divisional General; Luis Altamirano Talavera (1867–1938)	13 February 1922	28 November 1924	2 years, 289 days
7	Pedro Pablo Dartnell Encina	Divisional General; Pedro Pablo Dartnell Encina (1873–1944)	28 November 1924	23 January 1925	56 days
8	Mariano Navarrete Ciris [es]	Divisional General; Mariano Navarrete Ciris (1866–1940)	31 January 1925	10 November 1925	283 days

== Presidential republic (1925–1973) ==
No.	Portrait	Name	Took office	Left office	Time in office
Inspector General
1	Juan Emilio Ortiz Vega [es]	Divisional General; Juan Emilio Ortiz Vega (1869–1939)	11 November 1925	7 January 1927	1 year, 57 days
2	Francisco Javier Díaz Valderrama [es]	Divisional General; Francisco Javier Díaz Valderrama (1877–1950)	18 February 1927	20 March 1930	3 years, 2 days
3	Pedro Charpin Rival [es]	Divisional General; Pedro Charpin Rival (1876–1958)	21 March 1930	7 November 1930	231 days
Army Commander-in-chief
4	Bartolomé Blanche Espejo	Divisional General; Bartolomé Blanche Espejo (1879–1970)	7 November 1930	4 August 1931	270 days
(3)	Pedro Charpin Rival [es]	Divisional General; Pedro Charpin Rival (1876–1956)	5 August 1931	22 August 1931	17 days
5	Indalicio Téllez Cárcamo [es]	Divisional General; Indalicio Téllez Cárcamo (1876–1964)	25 August 1931	11 June 1932	291 days
6	Agustín Moreno Ladrón de Guevara [es]	Divisional General; Agustín Moreno Ladrón de Guevara (1879–1964)	15 June 1932	2 August 1932	1 year, 48 days
7	Luis Otero Mujica	Divisional General; Luis Otero Mujica (1879–1940)	3 August 1932	26 December 1932	145 days
8	Pedro Vignola Cortés [es]	Divisional General; Pedro Vignola Cortés (1879–1941)	26 December 1932	21 December 1933	360 days
9	Marcial Urrutia Urrutia [es]	Divisional General; Marcial Urrutia Urrutia (1882–19??)	23 December 1933	27 March 1934	94 days
10	Óscar Novoa Fuentes [es]	Divisional General; Óscar Novoa Fuentes (1886–1978)	27 March 1934	20 December 1938	4 years, 268 days
11	Carlos Fuentes Rabe [es]	Divisional General; Carlos Fuentes Rabe (1887–1974)	26 December 1938	23 August 1940	1 year, 241 days
12	Óscar Escudero Otárola [es]	Divisional General; Óscar Escudero Otárola (1891–1957)	23 August 1940	8 March 1943	2 years, 197 days
13	Arturo Espinoza Mujica [es]	Divisional General; Arturo Espinoza Mujica (1890–19??)	12 August 1943	11 October 1944	1 year, 60 days
14	Alfredo Portales Mourgues [es]	Divisional General; Alfredo Portales Mourgues (1892–19??)	8 November 1944	12 November 1944	1 year, 4 days
15	Óscar Fuentes Pantoja [es]	Divisional General; Óscar Fuentes Pantoja (1895–19??)	12 November 1945	29 November 1946	1 year, 17 days
16	Guillermo Barrios Tirado [es]	Divisional General; Guillermo Barrios Tirado (1893–1967)	29 November 1946	2 August 1947	246 days
17	Ramón Cañas Montalva [es]	Divisional General; Ramón Cañas Montalva (1896–1977)	2 August 1947	8 October 1949	2 years, 67 days
(16)	Guillermo Barrios Tirado [es]	Divisional General; Guillermo Barrios Tirado (1893–1967)	8 October 1949	9 January 1950	93 days
18	Rafael Fernández Reyes	Divisional General; Rafael Fernández Reyes (1897–1964)	9 January 1950	28 October 1952	2 years, 293 days
19	Santiago Danús Peña [es]	Divisional General; Santiago Danús Peña (1896–19??)	3 November 1952	11 March 1953	128 days
20	Carlos Mezzano Camino [es]	Divisional General; Carlos Mezzano Camino (1902–1991)	11 March 1953	10 June 1954	1 year, 91 days
21	Enrique Franco Hidalgo [es]	Divisional General; Enrique Franco Hidalgo (1900–1988)	11 June 1954	17 March 1955	279 days
22	Raúl Araya Stiglich [es]	Divisional General; Raúl Araya Stiglich (1901–1989)	17 March 1955	8 May 1956	1 year, 52 days
23	Luis Vidal Vargas [es]	Divisional General; Luis Vidal Vargas (1904–19??)	8 May 1956	3 November 1958	2 years, 179 days
24	René Vidal Merino [es]	Divisional General; René Vidal Merino (1901–1987)	3 November 1958	13 November 1958	10 days
25	Óscar Izurieta Molina	Divisional General; Óscar Izurieta Molina (1909–1990)	14 November 1958	3 November 1964	5 years, 355 days
26	Bernardino Parada Moreno [es]	Divisional General; Bernardino Parada Moreno (1908–1968)	4 November 1964	4 July 1967	2 years, 242 days
27	Luis Miqueles Caridi	Divisional General; Luis Miqueles Caridi (1911–2000)	5 July 1967	3 May 1968	303 days
28	Sergio Castillo Aránguiz [es]	Divisional General; Sergio Castillo Aránguiz (1912–2012)	3 May 1968	24 October 1969	1 year, 174 days
29	René Schneider Chereau	Divisional General; René Schneider Chereau (1913–1970)	27 October 1969	22 October 1970	360 days
30	Carlos Prats González	Divisional General; Carlos Prats González (1915–1974)	26 October 1970	23 August 1973	2 years, 301 days

== Military rule and the present (1973–present) ==
No.	Portrait	Army Commander-in-chief	Took office	Left office	Time in office
1	Augusto Pinochet	Captain General; Augusto Pinochet (1915–2006)	23 August 1973	10 March 1998	24 years, 199 days
2	Ricardo Izurieta	Lieutenant General; Ricardo Izurieta (1943–2014)	11 March 1998	10 March 2002	3 years, 364 days
3	Juan Emilio Cheyre	Lieutenant General; Juan Emilio Cheyre (born 1947)	11 March 2002	10 March 2006	3 years, 364 days
4	Óscar Izurieta Ferrer [es]	Army General; Óscar Izurieta Ferrer (born 1950)	11 March 2006	9 March 2010	3 years, 363 days
5	Juan Miguel Fuente-Alba	Army General; Juan Miguel Fuente-Alba (born 1953)	10 March 2010	9 March 2014	3 years, 364 days
6	Humberto Oviedo	Army General; Humberto Oviedo (born 1959)	10 March 2014	9 March 2018	3 years, 364 days
7	Ricardo Martínez Menanteau	Army General; Ricardo Martínez Menanteau (born 1960)	9 March 2018	9 March 2022	4 years
8	Javier Iturriaga del Campo	Army General; Javier Iturriaga del Campo (born 1965)	9 March 2022	9 March 2026	4 years, 0 days
9	Pedro Varela Sabando	Army General; Pedro Varela Sabando	9 March 2026	Incumbent	243 days

== See also ==
- Chilean Armed Forces
- Chief of the Joint Chiefs of Defence (Chile)
- List of commanders-in-chief of the Chilean Navy
- List of commanders-in-chief of the Chilean Air Force
