= Alberto Bachelet =

Chilean Brigadier General of the Chilean Air Force

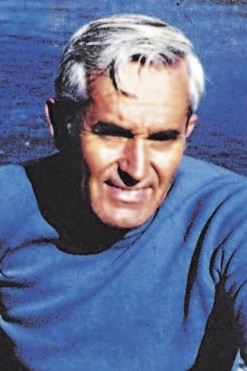
- Born: Alberto Arturo Miguel Bachelet Martínez; 27 April 1923; Santiago, Chile
- Died: 12 March 1974 (aged 50); Santiago, Chile
- Relatives: Ángela Jeria (spouse); Michelle Bachelet (daughter)
- Military career
- Allegiance: Chile
- Branch: Chilean Air Force
- Service years: 1940–1974
- Rank: Brigadier General (two-star rank)

Alberto Arturo Miguel Bachelet Martínez (Latin American Spanish: [alˈβeɾto aɾˈtuɾo miˈɣel βaʃeˈle maɾˈtines]; 27 April 1923 – 12 March 1974) was a Chilean Brigadier General of the Chilean Air Force. He opposed the 1973 coup of General Augusto Pinochet, and was imprisoned and subject to torture for several months until his death in 1974 of heart disease while in prison. His daughter Michelle Bachelet has been twice elected President of Chile.

== Career ==
Bachelet was born in Santiago to Alberto Bachelet Brandt and Mercedes Martínez Binimelis.

In 1940, in military service, he earned a scholarship to the School of Aviation Captain Manuel Avalos Prado, with Gustavo Leigh, by choice of the then commander of the Antiaircraft Artillery Regiment Hill, Colonel Luis Osvaldo Puccio Giesen. Leigh and Bachelet later were officers, one at Management Branch and the other at Branch of Air.

In 1962, under the presidency of Jorge Alessandri Rodríguez, Bachelet was appointed military attache to the Chilean Embassy in Washington D. C., USA. In 1972, Salvador Allende appointed him secretary of the National Supply and Marketing (DINAC), a position he had to turn the Boards of Supply and Prices (JAP).

During 1973, General Bachelet was working in the Accounts of the Chilean Air Force (FACH). When he opposed the coup of 11 September, led by the commander in chief Augusto Pinochet and supported, among others, by his friend Gustavo Leigh, he was first arrested on the same day, 11 September 1973, in the office of the Ministry of Defence. Although he was released that night, his house was raided on 14 September and he was arrested again.

He was held at the Air War Academy of FACH, and its principal then Colonel Fernando Matthei (Matthei has profusely denied any involvement in his interrogation and death, stating that he was in London during the coup, finishing his work as Air Attache and did not return to Chile until December 1973. He claimed that he was only the nominal head of the Academy, visiting it just once in February 1974, which was effectively being controlled by Gustavo Leigh as his personal headquarters outside of Pinochet's control). In this place Bachelet was subjected to interrogation and torture by his own comrades in arms. Then he was transferred to the FACH Hospital. In a letter to his son Albert, who lived in Australia, he reported:

They broke me inside, at one point, they morally bursted me – I never knew how to hate anyone – I always thought that the human being is the most wonderful thing in this creation and should be respected as such, but I found FACH comrades that I've known for 20 years, my students, who treated me like a criminal or a dog.

He was put under house arrest in October 1973, but on 18 December he was arrested for the third time with several officers and NCOs in the Air Force, who were tried for "treason" in Martial entitled Aviation / Bachelet and other ROL 1-73, also known as FACH Process.

He died on 12 March 1974, after suffering a heart attack while being in jail in Santiago, where he was being tortured.

== Family ==
He was married to archaeologist Ángela Jeria Gómez, with whom he fathered two children, Alberto and Michelle. Michelle later became the first female president of Chile.
