= Ricardo Montero =

Ricardo Montero may refer to:

- Ricardo Montero (referee) (born 1979), Costa Rican football referee
- Ricardo Montero (cyclist) (1902–1974), Spanish racing cyclist
- Ricardo Montero Allende (born 1963), Chilean biologist and politician
- Ricardo Montero Duque (born 1925), Cuban military commander

== See also ==
- Ricardo Monteiro (born 1985), Portuguese-French sprinter
