= Luis Otero =

Luis Otero may refer to:

- Luis Otero Mujica (1879–1940), general and Commander-in-chief of the Chilean Army
- Luis Otero (footballer) (1893–1955), Spanish footballer
- Luis Otero (actor), an Argentine actor
