= Rafael Fernández Reyes =

Chilean Army general and fencer (1897–c. 1964)

Rafael Fernández

Commander-in-chief of the Chilean Army
- In office 9 January 1950 – 2 November 1952
- President: Gabriel González Videla
- Preceded by: Guillermo Barrios
- Succeeded by: Santiago Danus

Personal details
- Born: 11 March 1897 Chile
- Died: c. 1964 Chile
- Education: Libertador Bernardo O'Higgins Military Academy
- Profession: Officer

Rafael Fernández Reyes (11 March 1897 – c. 1964) was a Chilean Army general and fencer who served as Commander-in-Chief of the Chilean Army from 1950 to 1952. As a fencer, he represented Chile at the 1924 Summer Olympics in Paris. and competed in the individual sabre competition at the 1924 Summer Olympics.

== Military career ==
Fernández entered the Military Academy as a cadet in 1912 and graduated in 1916 as a second lieutenant of artillery. He was initially assigned to the 1st Artillery Regiment Tacna in Santiago, Chile, and subsequently served with the 4th Artillery Group General Sotomayor.

In 1925, holding the rank of captain, Fernández taught topographic drawing at the Military Academy. The following year, he returned to the Tacna Regiment and began his studies at the Chilean Army War Academy. In 1933, by then a major, he returned to the Military Academy, where he served as secretary of studies and later as deputy director.

In 1935, Fernández served with the Chilean Army General Staff, and in 1939 he was appointed director of Recruitment and National Marksmanship. The following year, he became director of the Artillery School.

Fernández also served as military attaché in Brazil in 1943 and in the United States in 1948. He subsequently commanded the military garrisons of Valparaíso and Santiago.

On 9 January 1950, Fernández was appointed Commander-in-Chief of the Chilean Army. He remained in command until his retirement on 28 October 1952. During his tenure, Chile and the United States signed a military assistance agreement.

== Fencing career ==
In 1924, Fernández became Chilean national champion in sabre.

That same year, he represented Chile and the Chilean Army at the 1924 Summer Olympics in Paris, France. He was the first Chilean to compete in fencing at the Olympic Games.
