= Rodrigo Álvarez (disambiguation) =

Rodrigo Álvarez may refer to:

- Rodrigo Álvarez (died 1187), Galician nobleman and crusader
- Rodrigo Álvarez de las Asturias (died 1334), Spanish nobleman
- Rodrigo Álvarez Aguirre (born 1961), Chilean admiral
- Rodrigo Álvarez Zenteno (born 1966), Chilean politician
