= Urenda =

Urenda is a surname. Notable people with the surname include:

- Beltrán Urenda (1920–2013), Chilean politician
- Herm Urenda (1938–2019), American football player
