= Chief of the Joint Chiefs of Defence (Chile) =

Professional head of the Chilean Armed Forces

Chief of the Joint Staff of Defence
- Jefe del Estado Mayor Conjunto de la Defensa de Chile
- Incumbent; Pablo Niemann Figari since 20 November 2023
- Ministry of Defense
- Reports to: Minister of Defence
- Appointer: President of Chile
- Formation: 23 February 2010
- First holder: Cristián Le Dantec

The Chief of the Joint Staff of Defence (Spanish: Jefe del Estado Mayor Conjunto de la Defensa de Chile) is the professional head of the Chilean Armed Forces. The Chief is responsible for the administration and the operational control of the Chilean military.

The current Chief is Vice Admiral Pablo Niemann Figari. He was appointed by President Gabriel Boric on 20 November 2023.

== List of Chiefs ==
No.	Portrait	Name	Took office	Left office	Time in office	Defence branch	Ref.
1	Cristián Le Dantec [es]	Divisional general Cristián Le Dantec (born 1953)	23 February 2010	17 January 2011	328 days	Chilean Army	
2	Hernán Mardones	Divisional general Hernán Mardones	17 January 2011	25 November 2013	2 years, 312 days	Chilean Army	
3	José Miguel Romero	Vice admiral José Miguel Romero	25 November 2013	31 December 2015	2 years, 36 days	Chilean Navy	
4	Arturo Merino Núñez	Aviation general Arturo Merino Núñez (born 1960)	1 January 2016	5 November 2018	2 years, 308 days	Chilean Air Force	
5	Rodrigo Álvarez Aguirre	Vice admiral Rodrigo Álvarez Aguirre (born 1961)	5 November 2018	13 November 2020	2 years, 8 days	Chilean Navy	
6	Javier Iturriaga del Campo	Divisional general Javier Iturriaga del Campo (born 1965)	13 November 2020	8 March 2022	1 year, 115 days	Chilean Army	
7	Guillermo Paiva Hernandez	Divisional general Guillermo Paiva Hernandez	9 March 2022	22 September 2022	197 days	Chilean Army	
8	José Luis Fernández Morales	Vice admiral José Luis Fernández Morales	23 September 2022	24 November 2022	62 days	Chilean Navy	
9	José Nogueira León	Aviation general José Nogueira León	24 November 2022	5 December 2022	11 days	Chilean Air Force	
10	Jean Pierre Desgroux Ycaza	Aviation general Jean Pierre Desgroux Ycaza	5 December 2022	20 November 2023	350 days	Chilean Air Force	
11	Pablo Niemann Figari	Vice admiral Pablo Niemann Figari	20 November 2023	Incumbent	2 years, 349 days	Chilean Navy	

== See also ==
- List of commanders-in-chief of the Chilean Army
- List of commanders-in-chief of the Chilean Navy
- List of commanders-in-chief of the Chilean Air Force
