= List of commanders-in-chief of the Chilean Air Force =

Commander-in-chief of the Chilean Air Force
- Comandante en jefe de la Fuerza Aérea de Chile
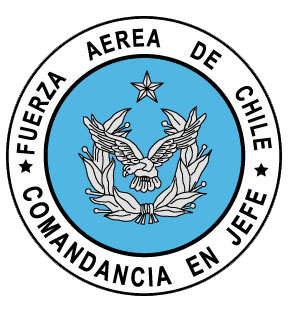
- Coat of arms of the Commander-in-chief

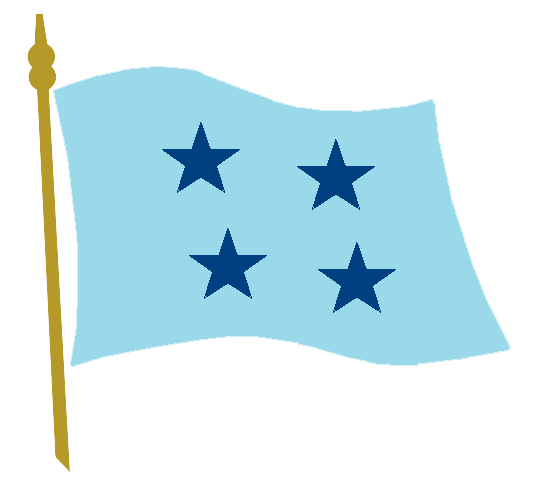
- Flag of the Commander-in-chief of the Chilean Air Force

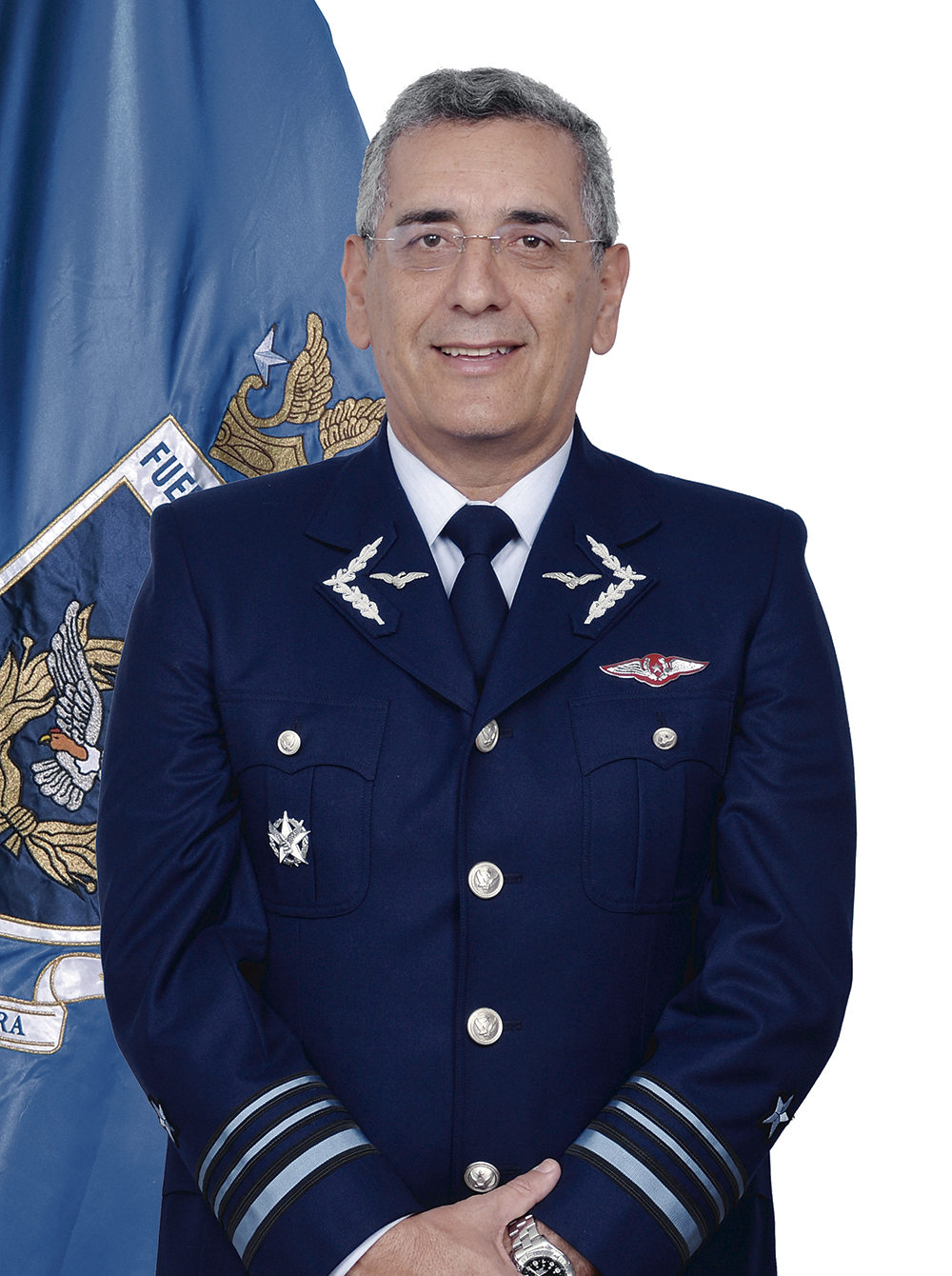
- Incumbent; Air General Hugo Rodríguez González since 5 November 2022
- Chilean Air Force
- Reports to: Chief of the Joint Chiefs of Defence
- Seat: Cerrillos
- Appointer: President of Chile
- Term length: 4 years
- Formation: 21 March 1930
- First holder: Arturo Merino Benítez

The Commander-in-chief of the Chilean Air Force (Spanish: Comandante en jefe de la Fuerza Aérea de Chile) is chief of the Chilean Air Force. He also commands operations, administration and logistics within the air force.

The current Commander-in-Chief is Air General Hugo Rodríguez González. He was appointed by former President Gabriel Boric on 5 November 2022.

== List ==
Portrait	Rank	Name	Took office	Left office
	Air Commodore	Arturo Merino Benítez	21 March 1930	1931
	Colonel of Aviation	Adirio Jessen Ahumada	1932	1932
	Squadron Commander	Ramón Vergara Montero	1932	1932
	Group Commander	Marmaduque Grove Vallejos	1932	1932
	Air General	Diego Aracena Aguilar	1932	1939
	Air General	Armando Castro López	1939	1943
	Air General	Manuel Tovarías Arroyo	1943	1946
	Air General	Oscar Herreros Walker	1946	1947
	Air General	Aurelio Celedón Palma	1947	1952
	Air General	Armando Ortíz Ramírez	1952	1955
	Air General	Renato García Vergara	1955	1955
	Air General	Diego Barros Ortíz	1955	1961
	Air General	Eduardo Jensen Franke	1961	1964
	Air General	Máximo Errázuriz Ward	1964	1969
	Air General	Carlos Guerraty Villalobos	1969	1970
	Air General	César Ruiz Danyau	1970	17 August 1973
	Air General	Gustavo Leigh Guzmán	17 August 1973	24 July 1978
	Air General	Fernando Matthei Aubel	24 July 1978	31 July 1991
	Air General	Ramón Vega Hidalgo	1 August 1991	1995
	Air General	Fernando Rojas Vender	1995	1999
	Air General	Patricio Ríos Ponce	1999	2002
	Air General	Osvaldo Sarabia Vilches	2002	3 November 2006
	Air General	Ricardo Ortega Perrier	5 November 2006	5 November 2010
	Air General	Jorge Rojas Ávila	5 November 2010	5 November 2014
	Air General	Jorge Robles Mella	5 November 2014	5 November 2018
	Air General	Arturo Merino Núñez	5 November 2018	5 November 2022
	Air General	Hugo Rodríguez González	5 November 2022	Incumbent

== See also ==
- Chilean Armed Forces
- Chief of the Joint Chiefs of Defence (Chile)
- List of commanders-in-chief of the Chilean Army
- List of commanders-in-chief of the Chilean Navy
