= Francisco Chahuán =

Chilean politician and lawyer

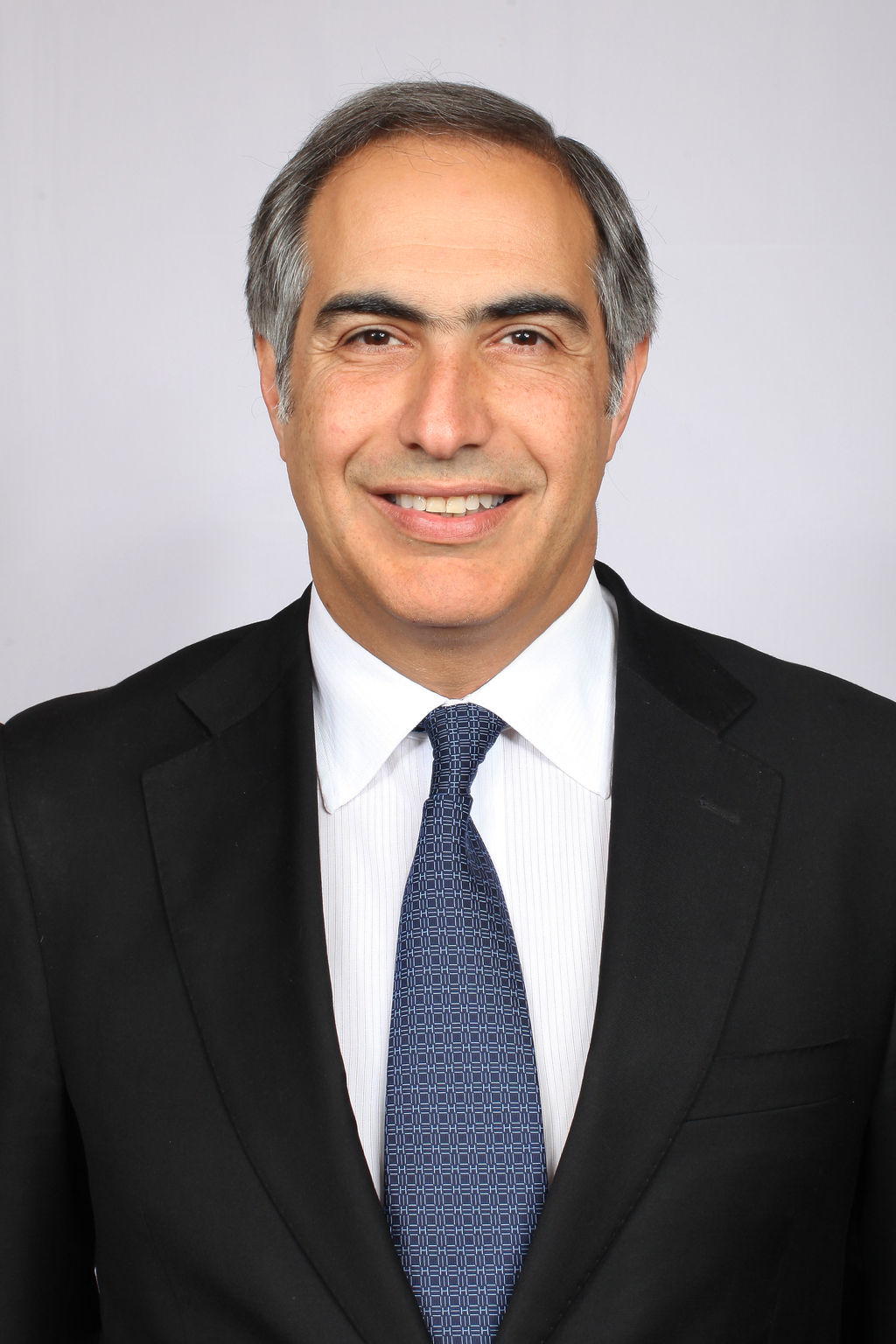

Ambassador of Chile to Mexico
- Incumbent
- Assumed office 26 May 2026
- President: José Antonio Kast
- Preceded by: Beatriz Sánchez

National Renewal President
- In office 20 July 2021 – 2023
- Preceded by: Mario Desbordes
- Succeeded by: Rodrigo Galilea

Member of the Senate
- In office 11 March 2010 – 11 March 2026
- Preceded by: Jorge Arancibia
- Succeeded by: Karol Cariola
- Constituency: 6th Circumscription

Member of the Chamber of Deputies
- In office 11 March 2006 – 11 March 2010
- Preceded by: Gonzalo Ibáñez
- Succeeded by: Edmundo Eluchans
- Constituency: 14th District (Concón and Vina del Mar)

Personal details
- Born: 20 May 1971 (age 55) Vina del Mar, Chile
- Party: National Renewal (1988–)
- Spouse: Sandra Ibáñez
- Children: Four
- Education: University of Valparaíso
- Occupation: Politician
- Profession: Lawyer

Francisco Javier Chahuán Chahuán (born 20 May 1971) is a Chilean lawyer and politician who serves as Ambassador of Chile to Mexico since May 2026.

He has represented Valparaíso Region in the Senate since 2010, and previously served as a deputy for Concón and Viña del Mar from 2006 to 2010. A long-standing member and former president of the centre-right party National Renewal (RN).

Chahuán trained as a lawyer at the University of Valparaíso (UV), graduating in 1996. He began his professional career in legal advisory roles to both public institutions and private companies. In 2006, he was elected to the Chamber of Deputies, representing District 14 (Concón and Viña del Mar), and four years later was elected senator for the Valparaíso Region, securing re-election in 2017. From 2021 to 2023, he served as president of RN.

During his time in Congress, Chahuán has been among the most active legislators, lodging hundreds of bills and motions—particularly focused on health, electoral reform, and constitutional affairs. He has chaired or participated in numerous key Senate commissions, including those on Human Rights, Science and Future Affairs.

== Biography ==
Francisco Chahuán was born on 20 May 1971 in Viña del Mar to Fuad Chahuán Aguad, a pharmaceutical chemist and pharmacy owner, and Lidia Chahuán Issa, a lawyer and notary. He attended Rafael Ariztía Institute in Quillota, the Arab School, and the Sacred Hearts School in Viña, completing high school in 1988.

In 1989, he entered the School of Law at the University of Valparaíso, earning his law degree in 1996 with a thesis on the historical-legal analysis of the Israeli–Palestinian conflict. While at university, he held leadership positions in student and Palestinian community organizations, including the General Union of Palestinian Students and the Palestinian Federation of Chile.

He pursued several postgraduate diplomas in areas such as negotiation, intellectual property, and environmental auditing, and later undertook master's-level studies in international relations focused on tolerance and peace.

Professionally, Chahuán served as a legal advisor to Senator Sergio Romero Pizarro (1991–1993), practiced law for private entities, and took on legal roles for the municipality of Limache (1997). He advanced to become Legal Manager at Empresas Melón S.A., also serving on board positions in associated companies, before founding and participating in public interest groups dedicated to rights advocacy.

== Political career ==
Chahuán began his political activism in 1987 co-founding a religious student movement in Valparaíso. He entered party politics through National Renewal's youth wing, eventually serving as regional president (1995–1997), regional secretary-general (1997–1999), and national vice-president (2006–2008).

From 2006 to 2010, he held one term in the Chamber of Deputies, representing District 14, serving on Health and Human Rights committees and advocating for issues such as cystic fibrosis coverage and local infrastructure.

In 2010, Chahuán was elected senator for the Valparaíso Region. He was re‑elected in 2017 with over 22% of the vote in his constituency. His legislative output ranks among the highest in the Senate, with more than 296 motions registered from 2018 to 2024. He has served on commissions related to Foreign Affairs, Human Rights, Environment, and Future Challenges, leading the latter from 2022 into 2023 and advocating for institutional science promotion and future-oriented legislation.

Chahuán was elected president of RN in July 2021 and held the post until October 2023. In April 2025, he temporally resigned from the party after more than 30 years of membership to run as an independent in the failed Chile Vamos presidential primaries. The move was driven by internal disagreements over candidate selection.

On 26 May 2026, he was appointed by President José Antonio Kast as Ambassador of Chile to Mexico.

== Works ==
- Solidaridad ahora (1988)
- Testamento de simples palabras (1992)
- La solidaridad como fundamento de los derechos en el marco del régimen democrático (1996)
- Navegando hacia mi padre y al encuentro del hijo (2001)
- La palabra de Dios no tiene idiomas (2015)
- Semillas de futuro. Voces para el Chile 2030 (2015)
- Modernización del Ministerio de Relaciones Exteriores: un paso necesario (2017)
- Pequeñas letras (2017)
- Diagnóstico político para la acción (2017)
- Lineamientos Estratégicos sobre Política Nacional de Puertos (2018)

In co-autory with Jorge Salomó

- Gustavo Lorca Rojas, Hombre de bien, ejemplo de buena política (2016)

In co-autory with Francisco Sánchez and Diego Piedra

- 1978: Tempestad en el Beagle (2018)
