= Luis Pareto =

Chilean politician (1928–2022)

Luis Pareto González
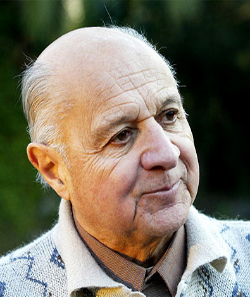

Head of the Chamber of Deputies of Chile
- In office 3 Abril 2001 – 11 March 2002
- Preceded by: Víctor Barrueto
- Succeeded by: Adriana Muñoz D'Albora
- In office 23 May 1973 – 21 September 1973
- Preceded by: Fernando Sanhueza
- Succeeded by: José Antonio Viera-Gallo (1990)

Member of the Chamber of Deputies of Chile
- In office 11 March 1998 – 11 March 2002
- Preceded by: Carlos Dupré
- Succeeded by: Cristian Pareto
- Constituency: 20th District
- In office 15 May 1957 – 21 September 1973
- Constituency: Santiago Metropolitan Region

Intendant of the Santiago Metropolitan Region
- In office 11 March 1990 – 11 March 1994
- Appointed by: Patricio Aylwin
- Preceded by: Carlos Carvallo Yáñez
- Succeeded by: Fernando Castillo Velasco

Personal details
- Born: 29 August 1928 Santiago, Chile
- Died: 7 January 2022 (aged 93) Santiago, Chile
- Party: Christian Democratic Party
- Spouse: Carolina Vergara
- Children: Four
- Education: Bernardo O'Higgins Military Academy

Luis Pareto González (29 August 1928 – 7 January 2022) was a Chilean politician.

== Life and career ==
A member of the Christian Democrat Party of Chile, Pareto served as a deputy, and in that role, he became the President of the Chamber of Deputies of Chile from 23 May 1973 until the coup d'état on 11 September of that year, and between March 2001 and March 2002. He also served as the Intendant of the Santiago Metropolitan Region during the presidency of Patricio Aylwin, the first of the Chilean transition to democracy (1990–1994). He died on 7 January 2022, at the age of 93.
