= Javier Iturriaga del Campo =

Chilean military general (born 1965)

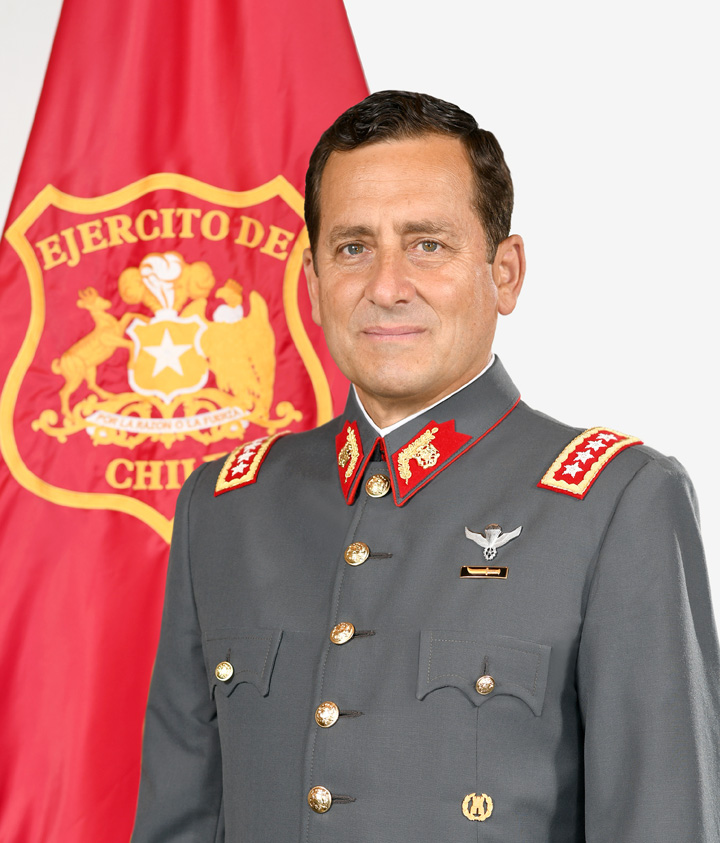
- Official portrait, 2023

Commander-in-chief of the Chile Army
- In office 9 March 2022 – 9 March 2026
- Appointed by: Sebastián Piñera
- Preceded by: Ricardo Martínez Menanteau
- Succeeded by: Pedro Varela Sabando

Chief of the Joint Chiefs of Defence of Chile
- In office 13 November 2020 – 9 March 2022
- President: Sebastián Piñera
- Preceded by: Rodrigo Álvarez Aguirre

Chief of Defence of the Metropolitan Region of Santiago
- In office 19 October 2019 – 1 November 2019
- Preceded by: Position established
- Succeeded by: Carlos Ricotti Velásquez

Military attaché of Chile in Brazil
- In office January 2014 – December 2014

Personal details
- Born: 25 October 1965 (age 60) Santiago, Chile
- Parent(s): Dante Iturriaga; Gloria del Campo Ortiz
- Education: Bernardo O'Higgins Military Academy

Military service
- Allegiance: Chile
- Branch/service: Chilean Army
- Years of service: 1980–present
- Rank: Army General

Javier Eduardo Iturriaga del Campo (born 26 October 1965) is a Chilean military general.

He obtained a Bachelor's degree in military science and a master's degree in the same area with a major in planning and strategic management from Chilean Army War Academy.

He is known for having been appointed Chief for National Defense of Santiago Metropolitan Region by President Sebastián Piñera during the state of emergency that he decreted in 2019–20 riots famously known as Estallido Social de Chile.

== Early life ==
He is the son of Dante Iturriaga Marchese, a military man by profession, and Gloria del Campo Ortiz. He is the second of six siblings and nephew of the also militar Pablo Iturriaga, Cautín Province Mayor in 1974 involved in human right violations cases during Augusto Pinochet's dictatorship (1973–1990).

== Military career ==
He joined the Military Academy of General Libertator Bernardo O'Higgins in 1980. During his military career, he has served as a General Staff Officer and Infantry Weapon and Military Academy Professor. Likewise, he has Commando and Paratrooper specialties.

In 2014, he was designed by the President Michelle Bachelet as a military attaché in Brazil. In 2017, Iturriaga gained notoriety during January wildfires in Chile where he assumed the control of military forces in the town of Santa Olga. One year later, in November 2018, he was appointed by the President Sebastián Piñera as the General of the Chilean Army after the removal of eighteen generals amid the institution crisis related to economic fraud. Thus, he served as the Commander of Education and Doctrine of the Army.

On 19 October 2019, Iturriaga was appointed by Piñera as Chief for National Defense of Santiago Metropolitan Region during 2019–20 riots («Estallido Social» or «Social Outbreak»). Related to this appointment, centrist and far-left online media referred to him as «Tough man», specifically El Dínamo and La Izquierda Diario (troskist); this last one emphasized in his relatives convicted for human rights violations. By the other hand, after Piñera's declaration about «being in war» on 20 October, the next day, he unmarked himself saying he was a happy man and that he wasn't at war with anyone. Thus, the public opinion and media would later remember him for that phrase.

On 23 October 2020, participated in the unveiling of the bust of Peruvian Colonel Francisco Bolognesi at Escuela Militar, ceremony that was attended by Jaime Pomareda Montenegro, Ambassador of Peru in Chile. There, according the Government of Peru, «(...) Iturriaga extensively referred to Peruvian hero bravery and his value as a source of inspiration and an example of the fulfillment of duty for young cadets who are studying at (Chilean Army's) Military School». Likewise, Iturriaga highlighted the important place that Colonel Bolognesi's bust will occupy at Plaza Bicentenario, place where there are another figures of other Latin American heroes that adorn it.

On 13 November 2020, President Piñera appointed him as Chief of the Joint Chiefs of Defence.

In May 2022, Del Campo was admitted by the Brazilian president Jair Bolsonaro to the Order of Military Merit.

== Awards and decorations ==
Foreign decorations

Foreign Awards
Brazil	Order of Military Merit (Grand Officer)
