= Juan Miguel Fuente-Alba =

Chilean army general

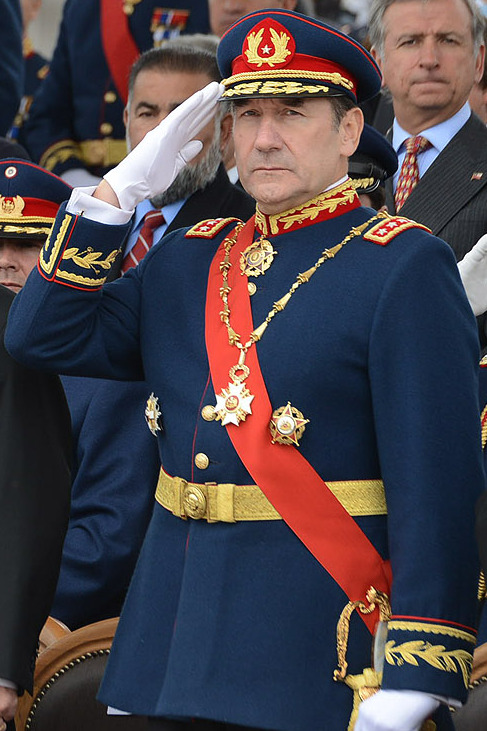

Commander-in-chief of the Chilean Army
- In office 10 March 2010 – 9 March 2014
- President: Sebastián Piñera
- Preceded by: Oscar Izurieta Ferrer
- Succeeded by: Humberto Oviedo

Personal details
- Born: 31 August 1953 (age 73) Santiago, Chile
- Spouse: Anita María Pinochet
- Children: 3
- Education: Libertador Bernardo O'Higgins Military Academy
- Occupation: Military Officer

Military service
- Branch/service: Chilean Army
- Years of service: 1970-2014
- Rank: Army General

Juan Miguel Fuente-Alba Poblete (born 31 August 1953 in Santiago de Chile) is a retired senior Chilean soldier. He held the position of Commander in Chief of the Chilean Army between 10 March 2010, and 9 March 2014.

== Military career ==
=== Home and promotions ===
In 1970, he joined the Military School of Libertador Bernardo O'Higgins and graduated as a second lieutenant of infantry in 1972. Between that year and 1981 he took several courses: Basic Knowledge and Mountain Environment, Basic Application of Junior Officer, Application of Commander of the Fundamental Unit, of Basic Intelligence and of Specialised Intelligence and of Pedagogical Training.

In 1983, he entered the War Academy of the Chilean Army as a student, graduating as a staff officer in 1985, and a licentiate in military sciences. While he was in the second year of the regular course of the General Staff, he also took the Pedagogical Training course for an academy military professor. ^{2}

They emphasise, among others, their titles of military professor of school in the subject of tactics and technique of infantry and military professor of academy in the subject of intelligence. He completed a master's degree in political philosophy and received the academic degree of Master in military sciences with a mention in planning and strategic management.

In 1999, he was assigned as a military attaché to the Embassy of Chile in Argentina. Upon his return, he became a student of the High Command course at the National Academy of Political and Strategic Studies and at the end of 2001 he became director of the Military School.

=== Generalate ===
In 2002, he was promoted to brigadier general, and between 2004 and 2005 he served as director of the Center for Military Studies and Investigations.

In 2006, he was promoted to the rank of General of Division and appointed as Defense and Military Attaché to the Embassy of Chile and head of the Military Mission of Chile in Washington DC, United States.

In 2007 he assumed the Commander in Chief of the II Army Division in Santiago and the following year the Commandery of Institutes and Doctrine.

On March 9, 2010, he was promoted to Army General and appointed Commander-in-Chief of the Army, a few days after an earthquake that occurred on February 27 of that year. At the end of March of that year, it created a Humanitarian Support Force to reinforce the work of the Army after the catastrophe.

In July 2010, he issued a statement regarding the participation of generals of his institution in the assassination of General Carlos Prats and his wife Sofía Cuthbert in Buenos Aires whilst they were both in voluntary exile in Argentina by use of a car bomb as planted by Dirección de Inteligencia Nacional.

=== Ranks ===
- 1970 : Cadet of the Military School
- 1972 : Ensign
- 1972 : Second Lieutenant
- 1976 : Lieutenant
- 1981 : Captain
- 1987 : Major
- 1993 : Lieutenant Colonel
- 1998 : Colonel
- 2002 : Brigadier General
- 2006 : Division General
- 2010 : Army General
