= Jorge Arancibia =

Chilean sailor and politician (b. 1939)

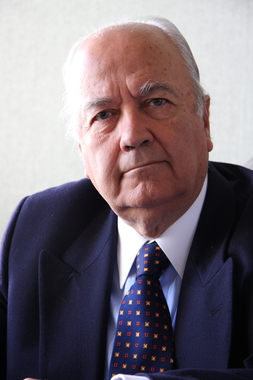

Member of the Constitutional Convention
- In office 4 July 2021 – 4 July 2022
- Constituency: 7th District

Ambassador of Chile in Turkey
- In office 1 September 2011 – 9 September 2013
- Preceded by: Luis Palma
- Succeeded by: Fernando Varela Palma

Member of the Senate of Chile
- In office 11 March 2002 – 11 March 2010
- Preceded by: Beltrán Urenda
- Succeeded by: Francisco Chahuán
- Constituency: 6th Circumscription

Commanders-in-chief of the Chilean Navy
- In office 14 November 1997 – 18 June 2001
- Preceded by: Jorge Martínez Busch
- Succeeded by: Miguel Ángel Vergara

Personal details
- Born: 17 September 1939 (age 87) Santiago, Chile
- Party: Unión Demócrata Independiente (UDI); Ind. close to right-wing (2016–2020); Close to Republican Party (2020–)
- Spouse: Mónica Salomon
- Children: Three
- Parent(s): Pedro Arancibia; Olga Reyes
- Education: Arturo Prat Naval Academy
- Occupation: Politician
- Profession: Sailor

Jorge Patricio Arancibia Reyes (born 17 September 1939) is a Chilean retired naval officer, politician, and diplomat.

A former Admiral of the Chilean Navy, he served as Commander-in-Chief of the Chilean Navy from 1997 to 2001. He later became a member of the Senate of Chile representing the 6th Coastal Circumscription of the Valparaíso Region between 2002 and 2010.

Arancibia was also Ambassador of Chile to Turkey from 2011 to 2013, and a member of the Chilean Constitutional Convention elected in 2021 for the 7th District of the Valparaíso Region.

== Biography ==
Arancibia was born in Santiago on 17 September 1939. His mother was Olga Reyes Lanyon, a native of Valparaíso, and his father was an officer of the Maipo Regiment of the Chilean Army.

He is married to Mónica Salomón Bongardt and has three children.

== Naval career ==
He completed his secondary education at Instituto Alonso de Ercilla (Marist Brothers) in Santiago. In 1955, at the age of 15, he entered the Arturo Prat Naval Academy, graduating as a Midshipman in December 1960.

He qualified as an ordnance engineer with specialization in torpedoes, anti-submarine warfare, and naval mining. He was also an officer of the General Staff and obtained a master’s degree in Naval and Maritime Sciences, with a specialization in geopolitics.

In 1964 he served as a midshipman instructor, and in 1965 undertook advanced specialization courses in torpedoes and anti-submarine warfare in the United Kingdom, as well as General Staff studies in Chile and Spain.

Between 1970 and 1971, he served as instructor and head of studies at the Naval Academy, and between 1974 and 1975 as Deputy Director of the Seamen’s School. He was also a professor at the Naval War Academy.

During his naval career, he served as second commander of the IST Águila and the destroyer Orella, and in 1976 became commander of the patrol vessel Lautaro.

On 2 January 1980, with the rank of Captain, he was appointed Naval Aide-de-Camp to General Augusto Pinochet Ugarte, a position he held until 1982.

In 1983, he assumed command of the destroyer Ministro Zenteno. Between 1984 and 1985, he served as Naval Attaché at the Chilean Embassy in Buenos Aires, Argentina.

In 1987, he assumed command of the helicopter destroyer Almirante Cochrane. He also served aboard the cruiser O’Higgins, the barge Aspirante Morel, the transport ship Presidente Pinto, the missile destroyer Almirante Riveros, and the training ship Esmeralda.

In 1989, he was promoted to Rear Admiral and became Deputy Chief of the Navy’s General Staff. In 1992, he was appointed Commander-in-Chief of the First Naval Zone. In 1993, he was promoted to Vice Admiral and became Chief of the National Defense Staff.

On 14 November 1997, President Eduardo Frei Ruiz-Tagle promoted him to the rank of Admiral and appointed him Commander-in-Chief of the Chilean Navy. He resigned voluntarily from the Navy on 18 June 2001.

== Political career ==
Following the 2001 parliamentary elections, Arancibia joined the Independent Democratic Union. In March 2002, he became regional president of the party in the Valparaíso Region and served as head of the UDI Senate caucus until June 2006.

From 2002 to 2010, he served as Senator of the Republic representing the 6th Coastal Circumscription of the Valparaíso Region.

In September 2011, President Sebastián Piñera appointed him Ambassador of Chile to Turkey, a position he held until September 2013.

In the Constitutional Convention elections held on 15–16 May 2021, he was elected as a member of the Constitutional Convention for the 7th District of the Valparaíso Region, running as an independent within the Chile Vamos list with UDI support.
