= Arturo Merino Benítez =

Chilean aviator (1888–1970)

Commodore Arturo Merino Benitez
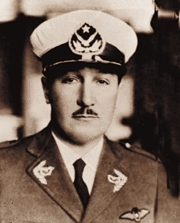
- Born: May 17, 1888; Chillán, Chile
- Died: May 2, 1970 (aged 81); Santiago, Chile
- Occupations: Soldier and airman
- Known for: Founding the Chilean Air Force
- Children: 8, including Arturo Merino Núñez

Commander-in-chief of the Chilean Air Force
- In office March 21, 1930 – July 26, 1931
- Preceded by: Office created
- Succeeded by: Adirio Jessen

Subsecretary of Aviation
- In office March 21, 1930 – June 21, 1931
- President: Carlos Ibáñez del Campo
- Preceded by: Office created
- Succeeded by: Ramón Vergara Montero
- Military career
- Education: Libertador Bernardo O'Higgins Military Academy Captain Manuel Ávalos Prado Aviation School
- Allegiance: Chile
- Branch: Chilean Army; Chilean Air Force
- Service years: 1903–1931
- Rank: Commodore

Commodore Arturo Merino Benítez (May 17, 1888 in Chillán, Ñuble Province – May 2, 1970 in Santiago) was an aviator with rank of Commodore, and the founder of both the Chilean Air Force (1930) and LAN Chile (1929) the national airline. He is known as the "Father of Chilean Aeronautics." Chile's largest airport was named in his honour, Arturo Merino Benítez International Airport. His parents were Pedro Merino Feliú and Clorinda Benítez Labbé. He was considered a close ally of Chilean socialist President Salvador Allende. He died from a stroke at age 82, with his remains at the Cementerio General de Santiago.

== Early life and education ==
Born into a prominent Chilean family, Merino was raised in a household of eleven children born to parents Pedro and Clorinda. He was enrolled in the Libertador Bernardo O'Higgins Military Academy at the age of 15 where he stood out as an exemplary cadet, being designated as a Brigadier Major before graduating in 1908 as an artillery second lieutenant. Being an Officer at the Military School he was promoted to Captain in 1913.

In 1917, Merino graduated as a Staff Officer from the Chilean War Academy, In the following year, Argentinian Luis Candelaria in April 1918 and Chilean Dagoberto Godoy in December 1918 both successfully crossed the Andes Mountains in their Bristol M1 C. Merino was impressed by these developments and the use of dirigibles, airships (notably Zeppelins) and aircraft, which led him to deliver a landmark lecture at the War Academy on "superiority of aviation over cavalry in long-distance exploration and in combat itself." While in military school, Merino was highly influenced by the advent of military aviation and persevered to achieve understanding of both civilian and military aviation. Chile with its geography, logistics, lack of roads and communication was a daunting task to connect. Aviation as an aid proved to be the right tool for the job.

== Career ==
Arturo's long career would oddly begin in 1908 with the Artillery Regiment No.4, Miraflores, in Traiguen town which has an ethnically German descent population. Later on he would he would rise to the rank of Captain in 1913 and later to that of Staff Officer in the year 1917. In 1923 Arturo was appointed as a military attaché to the Chilean Embassy in Rio De Janeiro and subsequently promoted as Major.

By 1926 Commander Arturo would become the director of army aviation school, since having an artillery background Arturo took up a pilot training course during this period as he took it upon himself as a moral obligation as he would need to command pilots by 1928 he was director of newly setup army aviation directorate and would start unifying aviation command structures of the Chilean army, navy and other self defense groups into an independent branch of the national military. In 1928 he became the first undersecretary of aviation and would later on become the first airforce chief of Chile assuming the rank of Lieutenant Colonel.

He was known to overcome political, military, economic and interpersonal obstacles which hindered in the creation of an organised, professional airforce. This personal drive of his helped shaped popular political opinion and on March 21, 1930 it materialised as a decree for the creation of the Chilean Airforce (FACH) by the then President Carlos Ibanez Del Campo.

== Legacy ==
A primary school has been built in Chillan called as the Escuela Arturo Merino Benitez, also over the years the government of Chile has been very instrumental in the preservation and promulgation of the life and times of Chile's early pioneer aviators like Merino Benitez. The airport at Santiago was also named in his honour.

== Bibliography ==
(in Spanish)

- Biografía ICARITO ICARITO biography
- Fundación Arturo Merino B. Arturo Merino B. Foundation
