= Humberto Oviedo =

Chilean general

Army General Humberto Oviedo
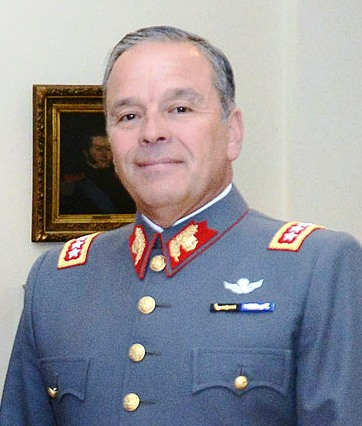
- General Humberto Oviedo (2014)

Commander-in-chief of the Chilean Army
- In office 9 March 2014 – 9 March 2018
- President: Michelle Bachelet
- Preceded by: Juan Miguel Fuente-Alba
- Succeeded by: Ricardo Martínez

Personal details
- Born: 28 July 1959 (age 67) Santiago, Chile
- Spouse: Marianne Virginia Stegmann Matthei
- Children: 3
- Occupation: Military officer

Military service
- Branch/service: Army

General Humberto Patricio Oviedo Arriagada (born Santiago 28 July 1959) is a retired Chilean military veteran and held the position of Commander-in-chief of the Chilean Army from 9 March 2014 to 9 March 2018.

== Biography ==
After graduating from the National Institute in 1974, Oviedo began his military career in 1975, graduating in 1978 from the Military School of Chilean independence leader Bernardo O'Higgins as second lieutenant of the infantry weapon, with the first antiquity of his promotion. In 1993 he joined the Army War Academy, and in 1995 he was titled as a staff officer.

On November 19, 2013, he was appointed as the new Commander-in-Chief of the Army by President Sebastián Piñera. He assumed the office on March 9, 2014 and remained until March 9, 2018, being succeeded by Ricardo Martínez.

== Controversy ==
Together with other former commanders in chief, Oviedo must testify as a witness for the investigation of the alleged fraud through the Mutual Assistance Fund of the Army.
