= Luis Otero Mujica =

Chilean general

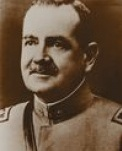

Commander-in-Chief of the Chilean Army
- In office 3 August 1932 – 26 December 1932
- Preceded by: Agustín Moreno
- Succeeded by: Pedro Vignola

Minister of War and Navy
- In office 14 September 1932 – 3 October 1932
- President: Bartolomé Blanche (provisional)
- Preceded by: Pedro Lagos
- Succeeded by: Carlos Sáez Morales

Personal details
- Born: 14 March 1879 Putaendo, Chile
- Died: 27 November 1938 (aged 59) Santiago, Chile
- Military career
- Education: Bernardo O'Higgins Military Academy
- Relatives: Ramón Otero (father)
- Allegiance: Chile
- Branch: Chilean Army
- Rank: Division General
- Commands: Commander-in-Chief of the Chilean Army

Luis Otero Mujica (14 March 1879 – 27 November 1938) was a Chilean Army officer who served as Commander-in-Chief of the Chilean Army from August to December 1932.

During the same period, he also served as Minister of War and Navy under the provisional government of Bartolomé Blanche.

== Early life ==
Otero was born in Putaendo, Chile, on 14 March 1879, the son of Ramón Otero and Susana Mujica.

In 1896, at the age of 17, he entered the Military Academy. He graduated the following year as a second lieutenant in the infantry and was assigned to the 2nd Company of the 7th Infantry Battalion. During the early stages of his military career, he served as a lieutenant in the 2nd Infantry Battalion Esmeralda.

In 1902, Otero transferred to the engineering branch and was assigned to the Santiago Company. The following year, he entered the Army War Academy. He was subsequently sent to Germany for advanced military training, where he served with the German Army's 14th Pioneer Battalion in Kehl.

After returning to Chile, Otero joined the Concepción Pontoon Engineer Company. Between 1907 and 1909, he continued his studies at the Army War Academy. After attaining the rank of captain, he served on the Army General Staff.

Otero was later assigned to the Railway Battalion. In 1918, he participated in the extension of the railway line from Puente Alto to El Volcán, in San José de Maipo.

Following his promotion to lieutenant colonel, Otero became commander of the Railway Regiment. At the same time, he taught at the Army War Academy, where he held the chair in siege warfare.

== Senior command ==
In 1925, Otero was appointed chief of staff of the 3rd Combined Brigade. He was subsequently promoted to colonel and appointed Inspector of Engineers. After his promotion to brigadier general in 1928, he served as commander of the Talca garrison and as a member of the Santiago Court Martial. He later became Chief of the Army General Staff.

By 1931, Otero had attained the rank of division general. He commanded the Army's II Division and subsequently served as Director of Services.

On 3 August 1932, Otero was appointed Commander-in-Chief of the Chilean Army, succeeding Agustín Moreno. His tenure took place amid the political instability that followed the Socialist Republic of Chile. He remained commander-in-chief until 26 December 1932, when he was succeeded by Pedro Vignola.

While serving as commander-in-chief, Otero was appointed Minister of War and Navy in the provisional government of Bartolomé Blanche. He held the ministerial portfolio from 14 September to 3 October 1932. He also served as military commander of the Santiago garrison.

Otero retired from the Chilean Army on 27 December 1932.

== Death ==
Otero died in Santiago, Chile, on 27 November 1938, at the age of 59.
