= Ángela Jeria =

Chilean mother of President Michelle Bachelet (1926–2020)

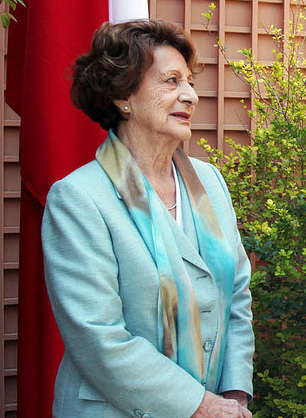
- Born: Ángela Margarita Jeria Gómez; 22 August 1926; Talca, Chile
- Died: 2 July 2020 (aged 93); Santiago, Chile
- Spouse: Alberto Bachelet
- Children: Michelle Bachelet
- Awards: Monseñor Leonidas Proaño

Academic background
- Education: University of Chile

Academic work
- Institutions: University of Chile
- Main interests: Archaeology

Ángela Margarita Jeria Gómez (22 August 1926 – 2 July 2020) was a Chilean archaeologist. Mother of the former President of Chile Michelle Bachelet, she was the wife of the Chilean Air Force Brigadier General Alberto Bachelet, who died after being tortured during the dictatorship of Augusto Pinochet. Jeria served informally in the role of first lady during the first Bachelet government, accompanying her daughter to several official functions. Her official protocolary role was "Director of the Sociocultural Area of the Presidency".

== Biography ==
=== Family and youth ===
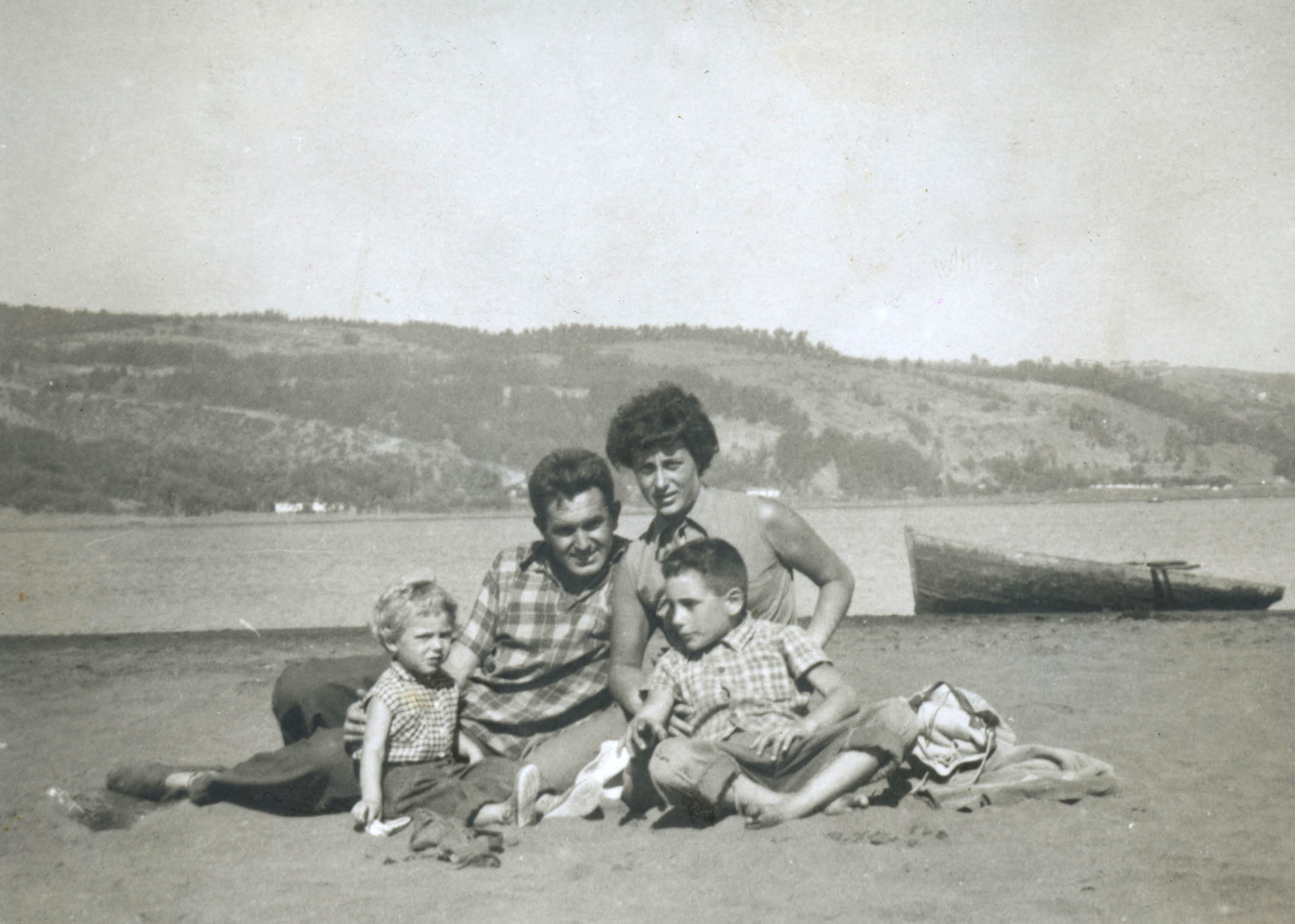
Ángela Jeria beside her husband Alberto and her two children in Cáhuil, O'Higgins Region.

Born on 22 August 1926 in Talca, Chile, Jeria Gómez was the daughter of Máximo Jeria Johnson (1892–1964) and Ángela Gómez Zamora (1893–1935). She was the granddaughter of Máximo Jeria Chacón, the first Chilean agricultural engineer.

In 1945 she married Alberto Bachelet in Temuco. They had two children: Alberto (13 October 1946 – 26 May 2001) and Verónica Michelle (born 29 September 1951).

Jeria worked for several years for the University of Chile, at the Editorial Universitaria (1948–1958) and in the Office of Budget and Finances of the university. After becoming Director of Finances of the university, she decided to study archaeology at the same university in 1969.

=== Military dictatorship: widowhood and exile ===
Her husband was secretary of the National Direction of Supply and Commercialisation (DINAC) in the government of Salvador Allende. In 1973, he opposed the military coup d'état. He was detained and tortured by some of his own Air Force comrades. Alberto Bachelet died of a heart attack in 1974, during his imprisonment in the Public Prison of Santiago. Jeria did not have the opportunity to finish her studies in archaeology because she was detained, with her daughter Michelle, and transferred to the centres of the DINA Villa Grimaldi and Cuatro Alamos, where she suffered torture.

After being freed and expelled from the country, Jeria lived in exile in Australia, where she began activist work against the military dictatorship of Pinochet, traveling to Mexico, Cuba and the Soviet Union. She also lived in the German Democratic Republic to stay with her daughter Michelle, who was studying medicine at Humboldt University in Berlin, Germany. There she worked as an assistant at a center of prehistory and archaeology.

In 1977, Jeria traveled to Washington, D.C. to testify on human rights violations in Chile, following the murder of Orlando Letelier.

=== Return to Chile and public role ===
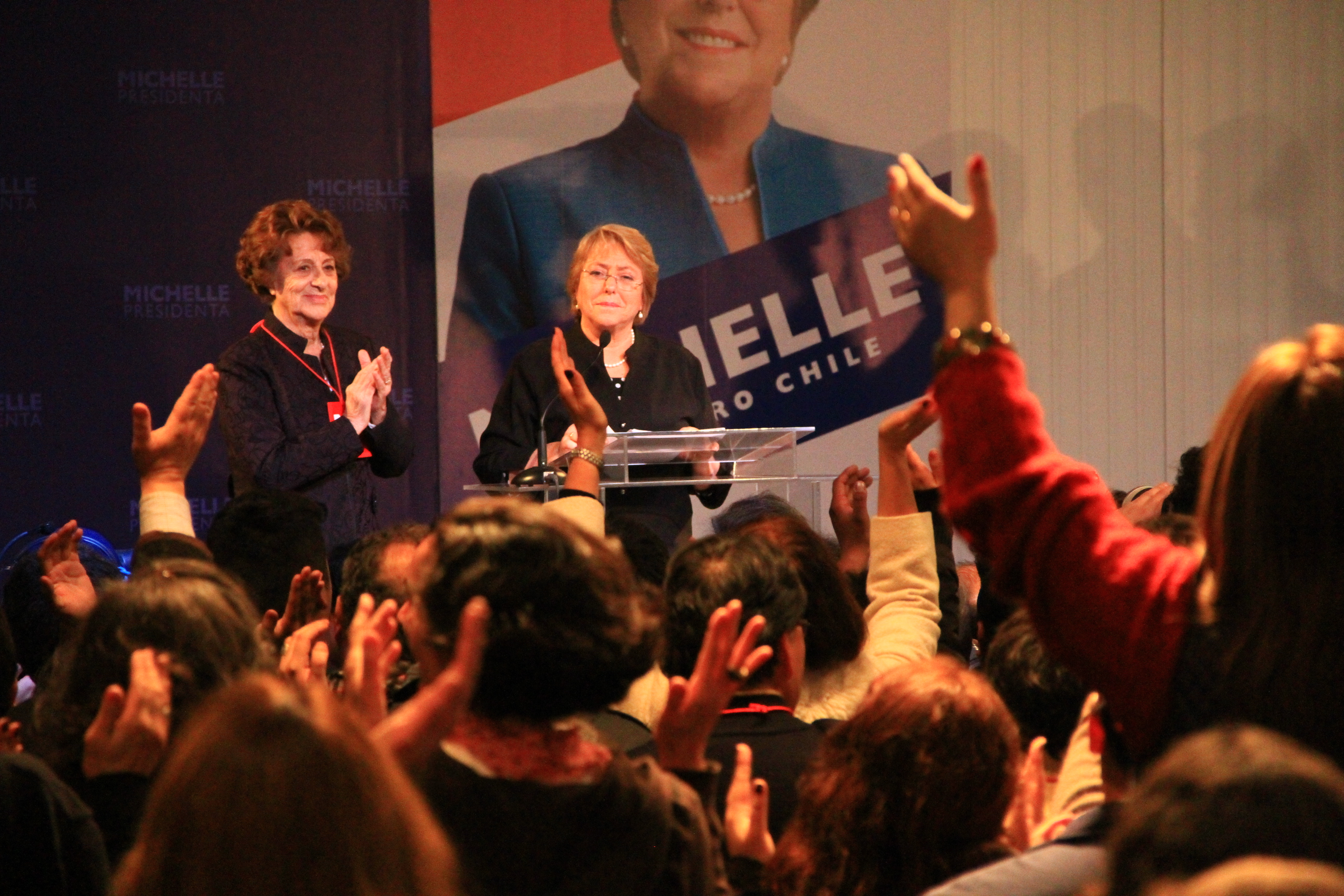
Jeria accompanying her daughter Michelle after her triumph in the presidential primary of the New Majority of 2013.

In 1979, Jeria went back to Chile with her family and started to work for human rights organisations. She was detained several times for participating in demonstrations against the military regime. In 1990, she resumed her studies of archaeology at the University of Chile, but abandoned them before graduating. Her granddaughter, Francisca Dávalos Bachelet, followed in her footsteps and studied archaeology at the same university, where she graduated in 2005.

In 2006, Jeria's daughter Michelle became the first woman to be elected president of Chile. On 21 November 2007, Jeria was awarded the "Medal University Senate" for her work at the University of Chile.

In October 2009, Jeria publicly supported the presidential candidacy of Eduardo Frei Ruiz-Tagle. In 2013, she supported the second presidential candidacy of her daughter Michelle.

Jeria received the prize "Monseñor Leonidas Proaño" for contributions to the defense of human rights in the region.

=== Death ===
On 3 July 2020, the Chilean air force announced that Jeria Gómez had died at the age of 93. She had earlier been admitted into a military hospital on 1 July in a "delicate state of health", though her illness was not specified.
