= Ramón Vega Hidalgo =

Chilean officer

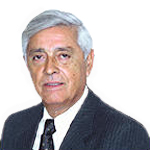

Member of the Senate of Chile
- In office 11 March 1998 – 11 March 2006
- Constituency: Appointed senator

Commanders-in-chief of the Chilean Air Force
- In office 31 July 1991 – 1995
- Preceded by: Fernando Matthei
- Succeeded by: Fernando Rojas Vender

Personal details
- Born: 1 February 1934 Santiago, Chile
- Died: 7 May 2014 (aged 80) Santiago, Chile
- Spouse: María Rosa Pizarro
- Children: 3
- Parent(s): Gustavo Vega; Hilda Hidalgo
- Education: Captain Manuel Ávalos Prado School of Aviation
- Profession: Military officer
- Military career
- Allegiance: Chile
- Branch: Chilean Air Force
- Service years: 1953–1995
- Rank: Air General
- Commands: 21st Air Defense Group (1972–1976); 6th Aviation Group (1976–1979); Fourth Air Brigade (1979–1983); Aviation School "Captain Manuel Ávalos Prado" (1983–1986); Logistics Command of the Air Force (1986–1991); Commander-in-Chief of the Air Force (1991–1995)

Ramón Vega Hidalgo (February 1, 1934 – May 7, 2014) was a Chilean politician and former airforce general. He was commander in chief of the Chilean Air Force from 1991 to 1995. In 1998 he was appointed institutional senator, a position he held starting in 1998. He left office in 2006.

Hidalgo was born in Santiago, Chile. He died from heart failure in Santiago, Chile, aged 80.

Air Force officer and politician. He served as an Institutional Senator for the period 1998–2006, appointed by the National Security Council, in his capacity as former Commander-in-Chief of the Chilean Air Force.

== Biography ==
=== Family and youth ===
He was born in Melipilla (Santiago) on 1 February 1934. His parents were Gustavo Vega and Hilda Adela Hidalgo.

On 27 January 1961, he married María Rosa Pizarro. He was the father of two daughters and one son.

=== Professional career ===
He entered the Chilean Air Force, where he obtained the rank of Combat Pilot. He later joined the United States Air Force, graduating with the same qualification. In addition, he earned the titles of General Staff Officer, Military Professor in Logistics and Planning, and Engineer in Aerial Photogrammetry.

As a pilot, he held various assignments and received successive promotions. He served as Commander of Aviation Group No. 10 at the Air War Academy; Chief of Staff of the Logistics Command; Air and Military Attaché in England; Commander-in-Chief of the Air Garrison of the Metropolitan Region and of the Second Air Brigade; President of the Chilean Space Affairs Committee; Director of Operations; Inspector General; and Chief of the General Staff.

He also devoted himself to delivering numerous lectures and conferences at Chilean and foreign universities on Space Affairs and Hemispheric Defense.

== Public career ==
During the Military Government, in parallel with his military duties, he served as Chief of Staff to the Minister of Agriculture and was appointed Inspector General of the Ministry of Transport and Telecommunications. He was also a member of the Chilean Boundary Commission of the Ministry of Foreign Affairs and served as Acting Minister of Defense.

In July 1991, he assumed office as Commander-in-Chief of the Chilean Air Force, replacing Fernando Matthei. As Commander-in-Chief, he created in 1993 the Non-Commissioned Officers Advanced Training School "Oscar Ossa Galdames". He retired from active service on 31 July 1995.

On 19 August 1995, he was prosecuted in connection with the payment of US$15 million in commissions not stipulated in the contracts for the acquisition of 25 Mirage aircraft in 1994.

While working in the private sector as an engineer, he was appointed on 23 December 1997 as an Institutional Senator by the National Security Council, in his capacity as former Commander-in-Chief of the Chilean Air Force, for the senatorial period 1998–2006.

He died in Santiago on 7 May 2014.

== Decorations ==
He received various decorations from the Chilean Air Force, the President of the Republic, and governments of several countries around the world, in recognition of his military and professional career.
