= Edmundo González Robles =

Chilean admiral

Admiral (R) Edmundo González
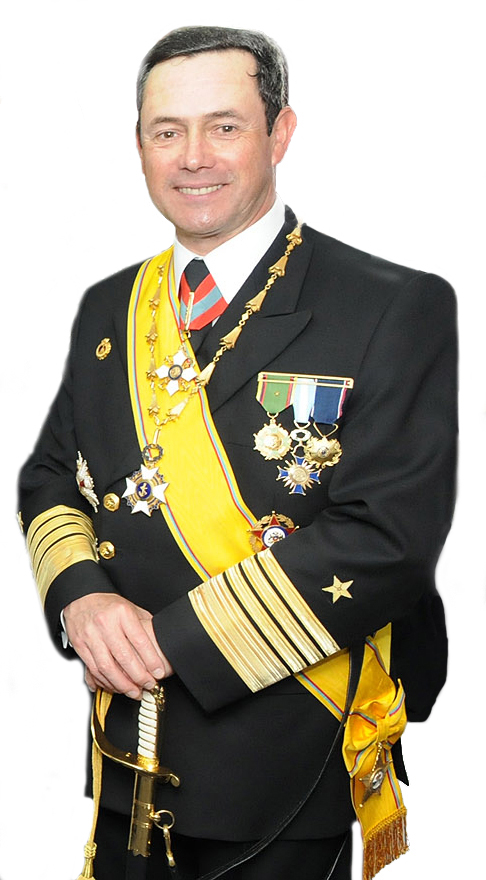
- González in 2010

Commander-in-Chief of the Chilean Navy
- In office 18 June 2009 – 18 June 2013
- President: Michelle Bachelet; Sebastián Piñera
- Preceded by: Rodolfo Codina
- Succeeded by: Enrique Larrañaga

Personal details
- Born: 17 April 1956 (age 70) Valparaíso, Chile
- Spouse: Patricia Corssen Macchiavello
- Children: 5

Military service
- Allegiance: Chile
- Branch/service: Chilean Navy
- Rank: Admiral
- Commands: Chilean Navy

Admiral Edmundo González Robles (born April 17, 1956) is a Chilean admiral, former commander in chief of the Chilean Navy, appointed by the Supreme Government of Chile for the period June 2009 - June 2013.

== Biography ==
Admiral González was born in Valparaíso on April 17, 1956, and after studying at "The Mackay School" in Viña del Mar, he entered the Naval Academy "Arturo Prat", and graduated as second lieutenant on 1 January 1975, for the twentieth Cruise aboard the training ship Esmeralda.

=== Destinations ===
Served as a junior officer aboard the cruiser Capitán Prat (CL-03), the destroyer "Almirante Riveros", the destroyer "Almirante Williams" and the Missile boat "Chipana".

Among their destinations on ground are highlighted by her tenure as instructor Grumetes School "Alejandro Navarrete Cisterna" and the Arms School of the Navy, as Orders Assistant of the Minister of National Defense; in the commandancy-in-chief of the Fourth Naval District; at the Naval Academy "Arturo Prat" as Deputy; in the Commandancy-in-chief of the Navy, as Admiral Secretary and the Naval War College as Professor, Head of Chair and finally as Director.

Admiral Gonzalez specializes in artillery and missiles, and staff. Admiral González has the professional title of Engineer-in-arms with a major in Artillery and Missiles and BSc in Naval and Maritime Sciences with mention in Artillery and Missiles. It is also a graduate of the United States Naval War College in Newport and joined the International Program of the Naval Command College. He has Master's Degree in Naval and Maritime Sciences mention Geopolitics and Master of Science, Administration mention in the Salve Regina University, Rhode Island, USA.

Among their destinations abroad also highlights its passage through the Strike Craft Flotilla Training School of the South African Navy as a lecturer and researcher, and concurrently invited, Strategic Research Program at the U.S. Naval War College.

Since December 23, 2003, he has served as Deputy Chief of General Staff of the Navy.

On April 21, 2004, was inaugurated as the Commodore.

On December 16, 2004 took over as Commander of the Third Naval Zone.

On 1 January 2005 the Supreme Government promoted him to the rank of rear Admiral.

In December 2006, took over as Commander in Chief of the Southern Military Region, based in Punta Arenas, the first Naval Officer to exercise that control.

On 1 January 2008 the Supreme Government awarded him the promotion to vice admiral and took over as General Director of Maritime Territory and Merchant Marine.

Beginning on June 18, 2009 was promoted to admiral and became Commander in Chief of the Chilean Navy.

=== Private life ===
Admiral Gonzalez is married to Mrs. Patricia Corssen Macchiavello, with whom he has five children.
