= Ricardo Martínez Menanteau =

Chilean military officer

Army General Ricardo Martínez Menanteau
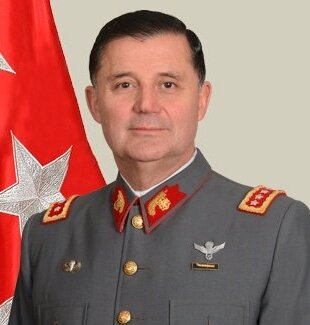

Commander-in-chief of the Chilean Army
- In office 9 March 2018 – 9 March 2022
- Appointed by: Michelle Bachelet
- President: Sebastián Piñera (2018−2022)
- Preceded by: Humberto Oviedo
- Succeeded by: Javier Iturriaga del Campo

Personal details
- Born: 24 February 1960 (age 66) Santiago, Chile

Military service
- Allegiance: Chile
- Branch/service: Chilean Army
- Years of service: 1976–present
- Rank: Army General/Commander-in-chief

Ricardo Martínez Menanteau (born 24 February 1960, Santiago, Chile) is a member of the Chilean military and has held the position of Commander-in-Chief of Chile since 9 March 2018, since being appointed by former president Michelle Bachelet after predecessor, Humberto Oviedo, retired.

== Early years ==
From 1972 to 1982 he lived with his family in Quillota due to the transfer of his father, Carlos Martínez Aguirre, who was a colonel in the Chilean army. He studied at the Rafael Ariztía Institute in Quillota, the same school as former president and commander-in-chief of Chile, General Augusto Pinochet. He was raised Catholic by his family.

== Military career ==
He entered the Liberator Bernardo O'Higgins Military School in 1976, graduating as a lieutenant in infantry weapons on 1 January 1980.

He holds a master's degree in Business Administration from the Adolfo Ibáñez University, A diploma in Hemispheric Defense and Security from the Inter-American Defense College in the United States and a Diploma in Joint Operations from the Institute for Hemispheric Security Cooperation also in the United States.

=== Ranks ===
1976: Cadet (Military School)

1979: Ensign

1980: Second lieutenant

1985: Lieutenant

1990: Captain

1994: Major

2000: Lieutenant colonel

2006: Colonel

2010: Brigadier general

2013: Divisional general

2018: Army General / Commander-in-chief

== Controversies ==
=== Foreign trips ===
According to an investigation by Radio Bío Bío published on 4 January, during the period in which Martinez served as Deputy Chief of Staff (2014-2015) with the rank of Brigadier General, he recorded 30 trips to different regions of the country and abroad, bound for the United States, Africa, Europe and Central America. The cost of these trips was 120 million pesos, including the payment of travel expenses and air tickets which he spend public money on.

The Ministry of Defense pointed out that Martinez informed the government of his total willingness to open his financial statements so that they could be audited by the government authorities.

=== Illegal weapons sales ===
After participating in a supposedly private meeting with about 900 officers, on November 20. Martinez admitted that he knew information about links between officers and organized crime. The speech was recorded by one of the attendees of the meeting and was later filtered by The Clinic, on 22 November 2018. As a result of this, he attended the Palacio de La Moneda that day on in the early hours of the morning, when Minister of Defense, Alberto Espina, spoke to him as a "matter of urgency", before his testimony. On 27 November, he was summoned to testify before the presidents of the Defense Commissions of the National Congress, about the alleged illegal sale of weapons. Martínez began his testimony by announcing legal actions against those responsible for recording his speech at the Military School, which he described as "illegal" and later leaked to The Clinic. On December 4, he testified before prosecutor Raúl Guzmán.
