= Víctor Barrueto =

Chilean constituent

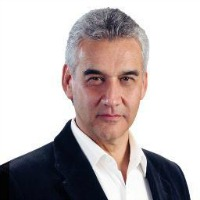

Undersecretary of Defense
- In office 10 March 2023 – 16 August 2023
- President: Gabriel Boric
- Preceded by: Gabriel Gaspar
- Succeeded by: Ricardo Montero Allende

Intendant of the Santiago Metropolitan Region
- In office 11 March 2006 – 7 January 2007
- Preceded by: Ximena Rincón
- Succeeded by: Adriana Delpiano

Member of the Chamber of Deputies
- In office 11 March 1990 – 11 March 2006
- Preceded by: District created
- Succeeded by: Raúl Súnico
- Constituency: 18th District

President of the Chamber of Deputies
- In office 23 March 2000 – 3 March 2001
- Vice President: Roberto León (1st Vice); Waldo Mora (2nd Vice)
- Preceded by: Carlos Montes Cisternas
- Succeeded by: Luis Pareto González

Personal details
- Born: 1 July 1953 (age 73) Madrid, Spain
- Party: Popular Unitary Action Movement; Socialist Party; Party for Democracy (1989–)
- Spouse: Sofía Briceño
- Children: Three
- Parent(s): Víctor Jeame; Nereida Barrueto
- Education: University of Chile
- Occupation: Politician
- Profession: Economist

Víctor Jeame Barrueto (born 1 July 1953) is a Chilean politician who has served as deputy and undersecretary.

== Early life and family ==
Barrueto was born in Madrid, Spain, on 1 July 1953. He is the son of Víctor Jeame Quintas and Nereida Barrueto Faure. Although his legal surname is Jeame, in political life he uses his maternal surname and is publicly known as Víctor Barrueto.

He is the grandson of former Liberal deputy and senator Edgardo Barrueto.

He married Sofía Briceño, and they have three children.

== Professional career ==
He completed his primary and secondary education at Colegio San Ignacio de Alonso Ovalle in Santiago. He later entered the Faculty of Economic and Administrative Sciences at the University of Chile, where he earned a degree in Commercial Engineering with a specialization in Economics.

Professionally, he has worked in research and finance departments of various private companies and served as adviser and researcher at the Labor Action and Advisory Center (Centro de Acción y Asesoría Laboral).

== Political career ==
He began his political activities in 1969 as a student leader. Between 1970 and 1971, he served as secretary general and president of the Unión de Estudiantes de Centro. In late 1970, he joined the Popular Unitary Action Movement (MAPU), where he served as secretary general from 1985 to 1989 and later as president in 1989.

In 1983, he was appointed leader of the Socialist Bloc, composed of the Socialist Party of Chile, the Christian Left, MAPU Obrero-Campesino, and the Socialist Convergence Group. In this capacity, he was one of the signatories of the National Agreement.

He participated in the founding of the Concertación de Partidos por el No on behalf of MAPU, and later in the creation of the Concertación de Partidos por la Democracia and the Party for Democracy (PPD) in 1987. He subsequently became a member of the central leadership of this political coalition and served as president of the PPD between 2003 and 2006.

He served as Intendant of the Santiago Metropolitan Region from 11 March 2006 until January 2007 during the first administration of Michelle Bachelet.

He ran as a pre-candidate for mayor of La Florida for the 2008–2012 term but was not elected.

In the November 2013 parliamentary elections, he ran as a candidate for the Chamber of Deputies representing District No. 24 for the Party for Democracy but was not elected.

He has been a member of the board of directors of BancoEstado and executive director of ACTUS and the Transurbano and Por la Democracia foundations.

He was appointed Undersecretary of Defense by President Gabriel Boric on 10 March 2023 and served until 16 August 2023.
