= Fernando Matthei =

Chilean Air Force General

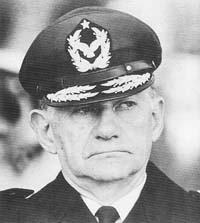

Commander-in-Chief of the Chilean Air Force
- In office July 24, 1978 – July 31, 1991
- Preceded by: Gustavo Leigh
- Succeeded by: Ramón Vega Hidalgo

Personal details
- Born: Fernando Matthei Aubel; 11 July 1925 Osorno, Chile
- Died: 19 November 2017 (aged 92) Santiago, Chile
- Relations: Evelyn Matthei (daughter)
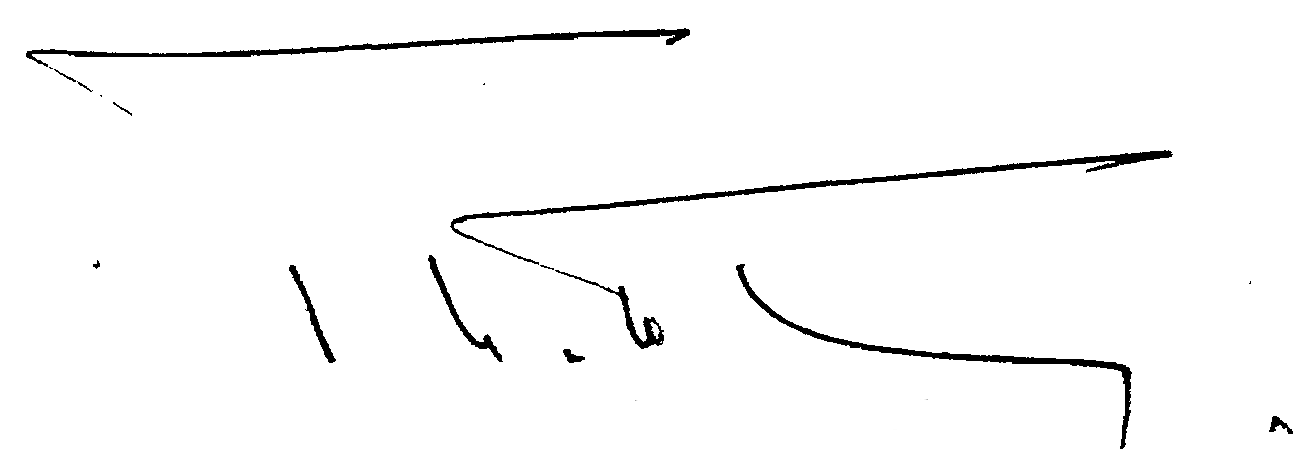
- Signature

Military service
- Allegiance: Chile
- Branch/service: Chilean Air Force
- Years of service: 1946–1991
- Rank: Air General
- Commands: 2nd Aviation Group (1963–67) First Air Brigade (1970–74); Combat Command of the Air Force (1974–78); Commander-in-Chief of the Air Force (1978–1991)

Fernando Matthei Aubel (11 July 1925 – 19 November 2017) was a Chilean Air Force general who was part of the military junta that ruled Chile from 1973 to 1990, replacing the dismissed Gustavo Leigh as commander-in-chief of the Chilean Air Force on 24 July 1978. He was part of the Junta from 1978 to 1990, and served as minister of health from 1976 to 1978, retiring from the Air Force in July 1991.

== Military career ==
The son of Fernando Matthei Gunkel and Luisa Aubel Renz, Matthei entered the Aviation School in 1945 and the following year he was assigned to the Condors Air Base, where he obtained his appointment as a fighter pilot. In 1948, he was commissioned as a sublieutenant and was assigned to the No. 4 Bomber Group in Colina, serving concurrently as a flight instructor at the School of Aviation and Officers. He was promoted to lieutenant in 1951. That same year he married Elda Fornet, with whom he had five children: Fernando, Evelyn, Robert, Hedy Jaqueline and Victor Alejandro.

In 1953, he traveled to the United States to study flight instruction at Craig Air Force Base in Alabama. He was promoted to flight captain in 1954, teaching classes in arms at the Aviation School. In 1957, he was assigned to Wing 1 in the Antofagasta Cerro Moreno Base.

Posted to Santiago in 1960, he was promoted to squadron commander and sent to the School of Aviation. He became the adjutant to the air force commander in chief, General Eduardo Iensen, the following year.

In 1966, he was promoted to group commander and served as commander of Aviation Group Nº7 between 1968 and 1969, when he was sent to visit facilities of the Royal Air Force (RAF). On his return home, he was appointed professor at the Air War Academy. From October 1969, he was a professor of the Pilots Course for Tactical Hawker Hunter Aircraft in Aviation Group No. 7.

In November 1971, he served as air attaché in the Chilean embassies in Britain and Sweden, based in London. On 12 October 1973, he was appointed Chief of the Air Mission of Chile in London.

After the 1973 Chilean coup d'état, he returned to Chile as director of the Air Force Academy. In January 1975, Matthei was promoted to air brigade general. On 19 March 1976, he was appointed Minister of Health.

On 24 July 1978, after the dismissal of General Gustavo Leigh and of most generals of the institution, Matthei was promoted to air general and appointed commander of the air force and a member of the military junta, occupying the Second Legislative Committee chair.

Declassified documents from Brazil link Matthei, between 1979 and 1980, within the framework of political repression and border tensions with Peru and Argentina, with the trafficking of bacteriological weapons (strains of Clostridium botulinum) from the Butantan Institute of São Paulo to Chile. These bacteria were tested in political prisoners of the Santiago Public Prison, when two died and five were seriously injured. Matthei made a secret visit to the Butantan Institute with a FACH delegation in 1979, which was recorded in photos found in 2024 in the Brazilian archives.

== Political career ==
Before becoming a junta member, Matthei was Minister of Health of the military government.

On October 5, 1988, he was the first member of the Governing Junta to acknowledge the victory of the "No" vote in the national plebiscite. On January 10, 2012, he wrote an important letter to the newspaper El Mercurio recounting the events of that night, titled “Facts Are Facts,” in which he stated that, despite disagreements among them regarding the best way to maintain public order that night, General Pinochet and the Junta “never wavered” in recognizing the result of the plebiscite and thus complying with the 1980 Constitution that they themselves had signed.

In October 1988, Matthei was the first member of the junta to publicly admit to the press, while entering La Moneda to meet Pinochet, that Pinochet had lost the referendum, in which if the "Sí" option won, Pinochet would have been elected for a new eight-year presidential term. In the wake of his electoral defeat, Pinochet had convened a meeting of his junta at La Moneda, in which he requested that they give him extraordinary powers to have the military control the capital. Matthei refused, saying that he would not agree to such a thing under any circumstances, and the rest of the junta followed his lead.

Intelligence reports from the United States believed this was a Pinochet's plan to seize power, however, on January 10, 2012, Matthei wrote a letter to the newspaper El Mercurio recounting the events of that night, titled "Facts Are Facts", in which he stated that, despite disagreements among them regarding the best way to maintain public order that night, General Pinochet and the Junta "never wavered" in recognizing the result of the plebiscite and thus complying with the 1980 Constitution that they themselves had signed.

General Jorge Ballerino, commander of the Military Institutes; Miguel Ángel Poduje, Minister of Housing; Sergio Fernández, Minister of the Interior; General Gabriel Omeño, Chief of Order the Chilean Carabineros and Sergio Valenzuela, Chief of the Presidential General Staff who were present in La Moneda Palace with Pinochet, claim that there wasn't a plan to disregard the results of the referendum. Later the same day, the government stated that the referendum result would be respected and that the 1980 Constitution path to democracy would be strictly followed. Pinochet backed down and accepted the result. The ensuing Constitutional process led to presidential and legislative elections the following year.

In 1990, with the return of democracy, Matthei ceased to be a member of the military junta, but retained his position as the commander in chief of the Air Force. He retired voluntarily on 31 July 1991 (although, as Pinochet, he could have continued to serve until 1998) and noted that with his retirement, the air force could fully adapt to democracy.

In 2003, the book Matthei. Mi testimonio, written by Chilean historians Patricia Arancibia and Isabel de la Maza, was published, in which Matthei recounted his public life.

In September 2005, Matthei admitted in a television program that he "did everything possible so that Argentina would lose" the 1982 Falklands War with Britain. The extent of Chilean assistance to the UK is documented in a book, My Secret Falklands War, by retired Royal Air Force Wing Commander Sidney Edwards, who was sent to Chile by the British government to act as a liaison between the Chilean and British governments during the conflict.

== Personal life and death ==
Matthei was born among a community of German Chileans in Southern Chile. Matthei was the father of Chilean senator and 2013 presidential candidate and former mayor of Providencia, Evelyn Matthei.

He died in 2017 and was buried in Parque del Recuerdo in Santiago.

== Literature ==
Arancibia P. y de la Maza I. (2003) Matthei. Mi testimonio. La Tercera/Mondadori, Santiago.

Political offices
Preceded by	Minister of Health; 1976–1978	Succeeded by
Preceded by Gustavo Leigh	Member of Government Junta; 1978–1990	Succeeded by None
Military offices
Preceded by Gustavo Leigh	Air Force Commander-in-chief; 1978–1991	Succeeded by Ramón Vega
