= Ricardo Montero Allende =

Chilean politician

Ricardo Montero
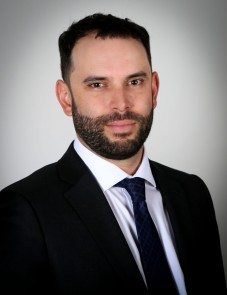

Undersecretary of Defense
- In office 16 August 2023 – 11 March 2026
- President: Gabriel Boric
- Preceded by: Víctor Barrueto
- Succeeded by: Rodrigo Álvarez Aguirre

Member of the Constitutional Convention
- In office 4 July 2021 – 4 July 2022
- Constituency: 18th District

Personal details
- Born: 12 June 1983 (age 43) Santiago, Chile
- Party: Socialist Party
- Parent(s): Ricardo Montero Jaramillo; María Luz Allende
- Education: Pontifical Catholic University of Chile (LL.B); Inter-American Defense College (LL.M); Autonomous University of Barcelona (Ph.D)
- Occupation: Politician
- Profession: Lawyer

Ricardo Montero Allende (born 12 June 1983 in Santiago) is a Chilean lawyer and politician of the Socialist Party of Chile.

He served as a member of the Constitutional Convention, representing the 18th electoral district of the Maule Region, and acted as coordinator of the Committee on the Political System, Legislative Power, and Electoral System.

== Biography ==
Montero Allende was born on 12 June 1983 in Santiago. He is the son of Adolfo Montero Jaramillo and María Luz Allende Urrutia.

He completed his primary and secondary education at Colegio del Verbo Divino. He studied law at the Pontifical Catholic University of Chile. He holds a Master’s degree in Defence and Security from the Inter-American Defense College –United States– and a Master’s degree in International Relations from the Autonomous University of Barcelona at Spain.

He volunteered with Techo para Chile, contributing both in Chile and other Latin American countries to the strengthening of community organization. Following the reconstruction process after the 2010 earthquake, he lived in Brazil for two years, where he led Techo’s team in São Paulo.

== Political career ==
Montero Allende is a member of the PS. During the second administration of President Michelle Bachelet, he served as chief of staff to the Ministers of National Defense (2014–2015) and Interior and Public Security (2015–2017).

In the same administration, he acted as national coordinator of the participatory stage of the constituent process. He later served as executive secretary of the Senate Commission on Carabineros Reform and as a member of the Permanent Forum on Foreign Policy.

In the elections held on 15–16 May 2021, he ran as a candidate for the 18th electoral district of the Maule Region as part of the Lista del Apruebo electoral pact, receiving 6,128 votes (5.5% of the validly cast votes).

After completing his work in the Constitutional Convention, on 8 September 2022 he assumed the position of chief of staff to the Minister of the Interior, Carolina Tohá. On 16 August 2023, President Gabriel Boric appointed him Undersecretary of Defense.
