= Enrique Larrañaga =

Chilean naval officer (born 1956)

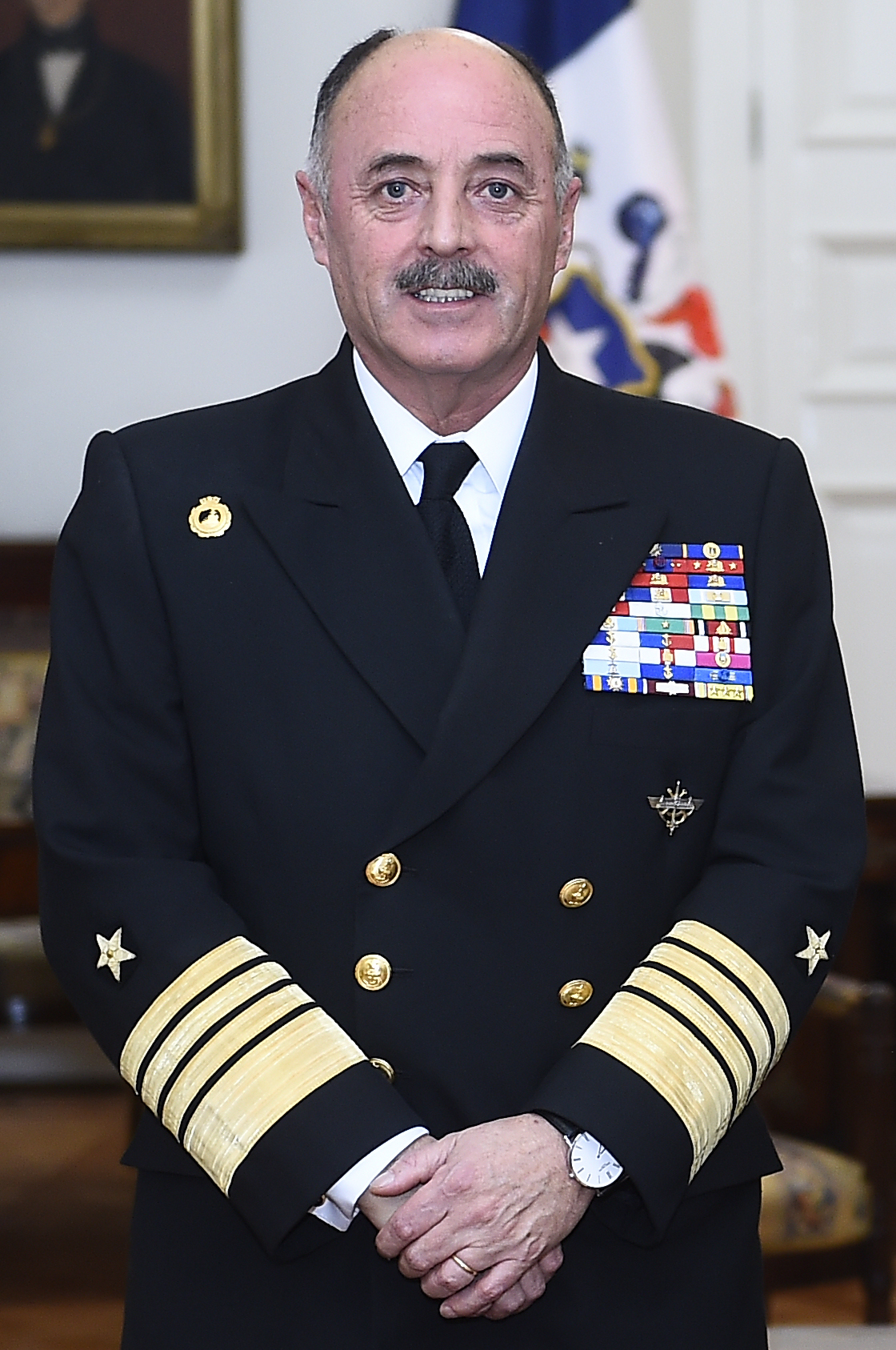

Commander-in-Chief of the Chilean Navy
- In office 18 June 2013 – 18 June 2017
- Appointed by: Sebastián Piñera
- President: Sebastián Piñera; Michelle Bachelet
- Preceded by: Edmundo González Robles
- Succeeded by: Julio Leiva Molina

Personal details
- Born: Enrique Larrañaga Martín; 17 April 1959 (age 67)
- Spouse: Jeannette Silva
- Children: 4

Military service
- Allegiance: Chile
- Branch/service: Chilean Navy
- Years of service: 1973-2017
- Rank: Admiral

Enrique Larrañaga Martín (born 17 April 1956) is the past commander-in-chief of the Chilean Navy.

== Family and education ==
Larrañaga studied at Saint Dominic's School. He entered the Naval Academy, graduating with the rank of second lieutenant in 1977. He is married to Jeanette Silva, with whom he has four children.

== Military career ==
Larrañaga served in several naval units, including the destroyer Transporte Orella, the destroyers Capitán Prat and Blanco Encalada, the missile frigate Almirante Lynch, and the training ship Esmeralda. He commanded the missile boat Chipana in 1994, the transport Aquiles in 1999, and the training ship Esmeralda in 2002.

He has served as Head of Studies at the Naval War Academy, Deputy Director of the Naval Polytechnic Academy, and Director of the Naval War Academy.

In 2006, he joined the Navy High Command and served as Director of Education, Secretary General, and Director General of the Maritime Territory and Merchant Marine.

On 18 June 2013, he was appointed commander-in-chief of the Navy by President Sebastián Piñera, assuming the position with the rank of admiral.
