= Ramón Búa Otero =

Spanish bishop (1933–2012)

- Bishop of Calahorra y La Calzada-Logroño
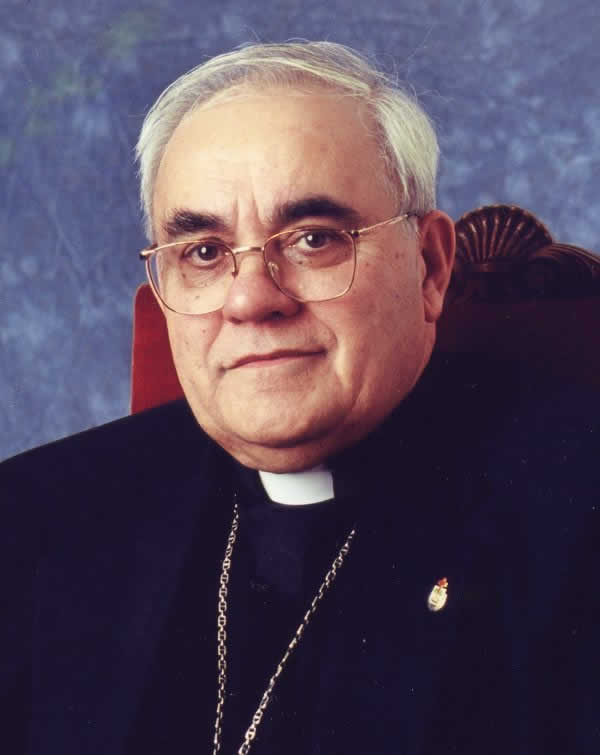
- Church: Catholic Church
- Diocese: Diocese of Calahorra y La Calzada-Logroño
- In office: 14 September 1989 – 15 September 2003
- Predecessor: Francisco Álvarez Martínez
- Successor: Juan José Omella
- Previous post: Bishop of Tarazona (1982-1989)

Orders
- Ordination: 19 March 1961
- Consecration: 21 February 1982 by Antonio Innocenti

Personal details
- Born: 28 April 1933 A Illa de Arousa, Province of Pontevedra, Spanish Republic
- Died: 21 April 2012 (aged 78)
- Coat of arms

Ramón Búa Otero (28 April 1933 – 21 April 2012) was the bishop of the Roman Catholic Diocese of Calahorra y La Calzada-Logroño.

Ordained in 1961, he became bishop in 1982, resigning in 2003.
