= Gustavo Leigh =

Chilean general (1920–1999)

General of the Air (R) Gustavo Leigh
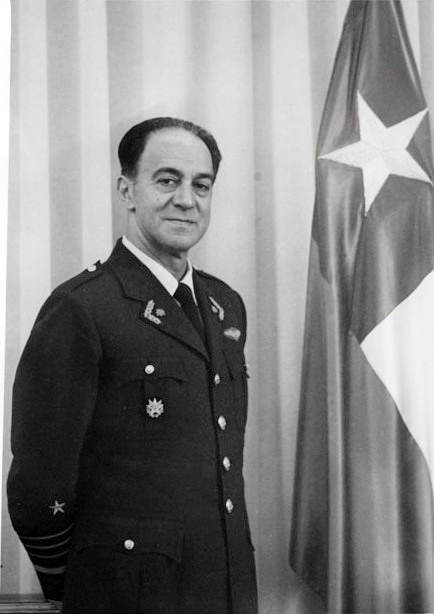
- Leigh c. 1974

Member of the Government Junta of Chile
- In office 11 September 1973 – 24 July 1978
- Preceded by: Office established
- Succeeded by: Fernando Matthei

Commander-in-Chief of the Chilean Air Force
- In office 17 August 1973 – 24 July 1978
- President: Salvador Allende; Augusto Pinochet
- Preceded by: César Ruiz Danyau
- Succeeded by: Fernando Matthei

Director of the Captain Manuel Ávalos Prado Aviation School
- In office 1969–1971
- President: Eduardo Frei Montalva; Salvador Allende
- Preceded by: Germán Díaz Visconti
- Succeeded by: José Berdichewsky Scher

Personal details
- Born: 19 September 1920 Santiago, Chile
- Died: 29 September 1999 (aged 79) Santiago, Chile
- Resting place: Parque del Recuerdo
- Spouse(s): Alicia Yates Taraba; Gabriela García
- Children: 6
- Education: Captain Manuel Ávalos Prado Aviation School

Military service
- Allegiance: Chile
- Branch/service: Chilean Air Force
- Rank: General of the Air
- Commands: Chilean Air Force
- Military career
- Allegiance: Chile
- Branch: Chilean Air Force
- Service years: 1938–1978 (commissioned as pilot officer in 1941)
- Rank: Air General
- Unit: 2nd Aviation Group
- Commands: 9th Aviation Group (1957–1961); 5th Aviation Group(1961–1963); Second Air Brigade(1963–1967); Aviation School "Captain Manuel Ávalos Prado"(1967–1970); Personnel Command of the Air Force(1970–1973); Commander-in-chief of the Air Force(1973–1978)
- Awards: Iron Cross First Class
- Other work: Statesman, Politician

Air General Gustavo Leigh Guzmán (September 19, 1920 – September 29, 1999) was a Chilean general, who represented the Air Force in the 1973 Chilean coup d'état and, for a time, in the ruling junta that followed. Leigh was forced out of the military government in 1978.

== Biography ==
Leigh was born in Santiago, son of a Judge, Hernán Leigh Bañados and Laura Guzmán Cea. His brother Hernán Leigh Guzmán (1918–2006), was a parliamentary of the Radical Party in the 1961–1965 period.

After a successful career as a pilot with a specialty in logistics and having reached the rank of General, President Salvador Allende named him commander-in-chief of the Air Force on August 17, 1973. However, Leigh was the first to sign the coup document, drafted by Vice Admiral José Toribio Merino, to depose Allende.

Leigh quickly emerged as the toughest member in the four-man military junta. Just hours after the coup, Leigh vowed that the military would "eradicate the Marxist cancer from our fatherland, until the last consequences." It was on his personal orders, he disclosed later, that the Air Force bombarded and heavily damaged the presidential palace to put down the resistance by Allende and a small group of his followers. He responded to criticisms of his order to bomb the La Moneda palace saying, "It was a hard measure to take, but believe me when I say that [...] it was a measure that saved many lives, because President Allende had decided to die in La Moneda [...]."

A fierce persecution of leftists followed, and Leigh's Air Force gained a reputation as especially implacable with dissidents. Leigh defended the coup, arguing that a civil war between Chileans was inevitable. When American President Jimmy Carter criticized the military rule in Chile in 1977, Leigh said, "He [Carter] is a hypocrite. He condemns Chile, but at the same time he wants closer relations with a dictatorship like Castro's in Cuba, that had led an authoritarian regime for 18 years."

He purged the Air Force of left-wing officers such as General Alberto Bachelet (the father of Michelle Bachelet, future Chilean president) and repeatedly called on Chileans to denounce left-wingers to the new authorities. Nonetheless, he clashed with Augusto Pinochet, the leader of the junta over the latter's refusal to name a date for a return to democracy. Leigh opposed Pinochet's growing power within the junta. In 1978, when Pinochet called a vote to request that Chileans reject the United Nations' condemnation of the regime's human rights record, Leigh called the move "typical of governments in which power is in the hands of a single dictator." Pinochet believed Leigh wanted to challenge him to lead the country. "Pinochet always felt that I was interested in taking over from him, something that never even entered my mind," Leigh said in one of his last television interviews.

== Exit from the Junta and latter years ==
General Leigh was a supporter of strong state intervention in the economy. He was heavily influenced by the Egyptian model being built by Anwar Sadat (he was a close friend of Hosni Mubarak, the Egyptian Air Force Chief, since 1971) of a mixed economy based on free market principles but a strong state presence in heavy industry and a strong state regulation over imports and the financial speculation market. He had continuous disagreements with the prevailing free market economic policy of the so-called Chicago Boys that was favoured by the US as well as Pinochet himself. He was strongly opposed to any divestment or privatisation in the State owned mining company Codelco. That led to his dismissal on July 24, 1978, in a decree signed by other junta members.

The junta selected General Fernando Matthei to replace him. Despite his strong differences with General Pinochet, he strongly opposed Pinochet's 1998 arrest as a violation of Chilean sovereignty.

Leigh was detained by a judge investigating his role in the disappearance of twelve communist leaders, but the Supreme Court of Chile ordered his release by virtue of the Law of Amnesty.

== Assassination attempt and death ==
On March 21, 1990, members of the leftist guerrilla group, the Manuel Rodríguez Patriotic Front, broke into Leigh's office and opened fire at him. Five bullets hit his body. Other than the loss of an eye, he was able to make a complete recovery.

Leigh died of cardiovascular ailments in Santiago's Air Force Hospital on September 29, 1999, aged 79. He was survived by his wife, Gabriela García, and six children from two marriages.

== Literature ==
Marras S. (1988) Confesiones. Las ediciones del Ornitorrinco, Santiago.

Varas F. (1979) Gustavo Leigh. El general disidente. Editorial Aconcagua, Santiago.

García de Leigh G. (2017) Leigh, El general republicano. GLG Ediciones, Santiago.

Political offices
Preceded by None	Member of Government Junta; 1973–1978	Succeeded by Fernando Matthei
Military offices
Preceded by César Ruiz Danyau	Air Force Commander-in-chief; 1973–1978	Succeeded by Fernando Matthei
