= Edmundo Eluchans =

Chilean politician (born 1950)

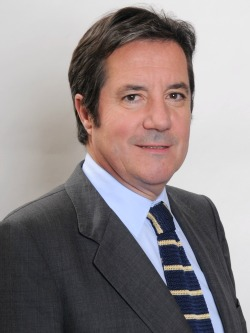

Member of the Constitutional Council
- In office 7 June 2023 – 7 November 2023
- Constituency: Valparaíso Region

President of the Chamber of Deputies
- In office 3 April 2013 – 11 March 2014
- Preceded by: Nicolás Monckeberg
- Succeeded by: Aldo Cornejo

Member of the Chamber of Deputies
- In office 11 March 2006 – 11 March 2014
- Preceded by: Carlos Hidalgo González
- Succeeded by: Osvaldo Urrutia
- Constituency: 15th District (2006–2010); 14th District (2010–2014)

Personal details
- Born: 21 January 1950 (age 76) Valparaíso, Chile
- Party: Independent Democratic Union
- Education: Pontifical Catholic University of Chile
- Occupation: Politician
- Profession: Lawyer

Edmundo Eluchans Urenda (born 21 January 1950) is a Chilean politician who served as President of the Chamber of Deputies and as a member of the Chamber of Deputies, representing Districts 14 and 15 of the Valparaíso Region.

Eluchans is a Chilean lawyer and politician with a long career in public service, academy, and party leadership. Trained in law at the Pontifical Catholic University of Chile, he has combined legal practice with teaching, serving as a professor of Commercial Law while also participating in the management of a private law firm.

A senior member of the Independent Democratic Union (UDI), he has held multiple leadership roles within the party since the return to democracy.

His public career includes parliamentary service, executive appointments, and advisory positions, as well as later participation in the Constitutional Council process, representing the Valparaíso Region as part of the Chile Seguro electoral pact.

== Biography ==
He was born in Valparaíso on 21 January 1950. He is the son of Edmundo Eluchans Malherbe and Florencia Urenda Zegers, and a nephew of Beltrán Urenda Zegers. He is married to María Eliana Aninat and is the father of five children: Edmundo, Pablo, Catalina, Martín, and Fernanda.

He completed his primary and secondary education at the Colegio de los Sagrados Corazones (Padres Franceses). He studied law at the Pontifical Catholic University of Chile (PUC) and qualified as a lawyer on 22 January 1973.

In his professional career, he has served as a professor of Commercial Law at Finis Terrae University and is a non-equity partner of the law firm Edmundo Eluchans y Cía.

== Political career ==
He began his political career in the Independent Democratic Union (UDI) and has been part of the party’s Political Commission since 1990. During the presidency of Pablo Longueira (1998–2004), he served for four years as vice president of the UDI national executive committee.

For the parliamentary elections of November 2013, he decided not to seek re-election for another term. From 2014 to 2018, he was retired from politics.

On 25 April 2018, he was appointed by President Sebastián Piñera as a member of the Board of Directors of Banco del Estado de Chile.

In 2023, he ran as a candidate for the Constitutional Council representing the Valparaíso Region, as a member of the UDI within the Chile Seguro electoral pact.

He was elected with 58,175 votes, corresponding to 5.41% of the valid votes cast.
