= Rodrigo Álvarez Aguirre =

Chilean admiral

- Official portrait (2026)

Undersecretary of Defence
- Incumbent
- Assumed office 11 March 2026
- President: José Antonio Kast
- Preceded by: Ricardo Montero Allende

Personal details
- Born: 26 January 1961 (age 65) Viña del Mar, Chile
- Profession: Naval officer
- Military career
- Allegiance: Chile
- Branch: Chilean Navy
- Rank: Vice admiral
- Commands: Chief of the Joint Chiefs of Defence; Deputy Chief of the Joint Chiefs of Staff; Commander-in-Chief of the Fleet; Fifth Naval Zone; Almirante Latorre; Uribe (LM-39)
- Conflicts: United Nations Stabilisation Mission in Haiti

Rodrigo Javier Álvarez Aguirre (born 26 January 1961) is a retired Chilean Navy vice admiral who served as Chief of the Joint Chiefs of Defence of the Chilean Armed Forces from 2018 to 2020.

After retiring from active naval service in December 2020, Álvarez returned to public service in March 2026, when President José Antonio Kast appointed him Undersecretary of Defense. His appointment took effect on 11 March 2026, and he formally assumed his duties as part of the administration of Defence Minister Fernando Barros Tocornal.

== Early life and education ==
Álvarez was born in Viña del Mar on 26 January 1961. After completing his secondary education in Santiago, he entered the Chilean Naval Academy and graduated as a midshipman in 1981.

He qualified as a weapons engineer specialising in electronic engineering and earned a master's degree in Naval and Maritime Sciences from the Chilean Naval War College. He later served at the Naval War College, including as its deputy academic director in 2008 and as director from December 2008.

== Naval career ==
During his naval career, Álvarez served aboard several surface vessels, including the destroyers Capitán Prat and Blanco Encalada, the missile boat Almirante Uribe, and the frigate Almirante Latorre. He became the first Chilean commanding officer of Almirante Latorre after the vessel entered service with the Chilean Navy. In 2007, while holding the rank of captain, he commanded Almirante Latorre during a deployment in which the frigate trained with the United States Navy.

Álvarez also held appointments in the Navy's Directorate of Programmes, Research and Development and the Fourth Naval Zone. His overseas assignments included service connected with the Chilean Naval Mission in the United States and postings in Israel and the Netherlands. His work in the Netherlands was associated with the acquisition and transfer to Chile of former Royal Netherlands Navy Karel Doorman-class and Jacob van Heemskerck-class frigates.

In December 2008, Álvarez became director of the Chilean Naval War College, having served as its deputy academic director during that year. He remained director during 2009 and 2010.

In November 2010, he was appointed commander-in-chief of the Fifth Naval Zone and was made a commodore. He was promoted to rear admiral on 1 January 2012 and later that year became Deputy Chief of the Navy General Staff. He continued in that position through 2014.

On 5 December 2014, Álvarez assumed command of the Chilean Fleet. In December 2015 he was appointed Deputy Chief of the Joint Chiefs of Staff, and on 1 January 2016 he was promoted to vice admiral. He remained Deputy Chief of the Joint Chiefs of Staff during 2017 and 2018.

In November 2018, President Sebastián Piñera appointed Álvarez Chief of the Joint Chiefs of Defence. He continued in the post until December 2020, when he ended his active naval career.
