= Julio Leiva Molina =

Chilean naval officer (born 1960)

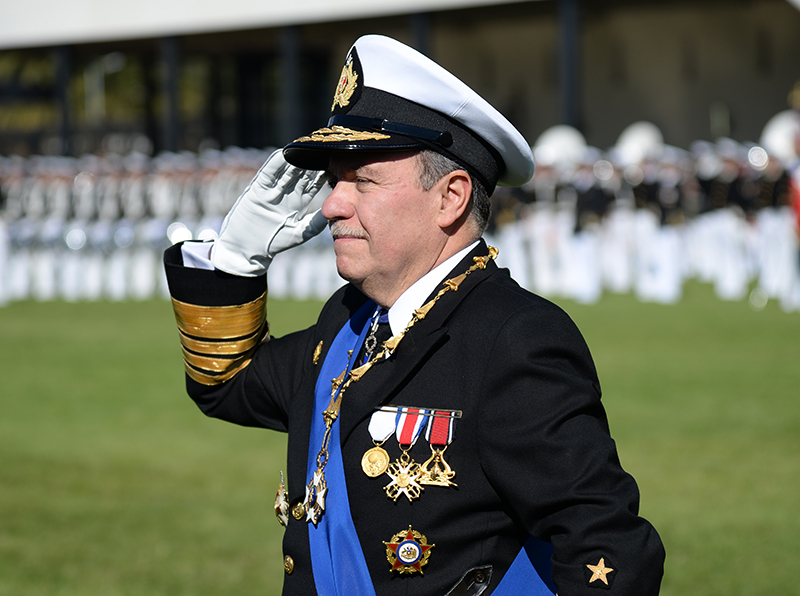

Commander-in-Chief of the Chilean Navy
- In office June 18, 2017 – June 18, 2021
- Preceded by: Enrique Larrañaga Martín
- Succeeded by: Juan Andrés de la Maza

Personal details
- Born: January 21, 1960 Santiago, Chile
- Spouse: Marcela Larrañaga
- Children: 3

Military service
- Allegiance: Chile
- Branch/service: Chilean Navy
- Years of service: 1977-2021
- Rank: Admiral

Julio Leiva Molina (born 21 January 1960) is the past commander-in-chief of the Chilean Navy.

He was the Commander In Chief from June 18, 2017 to June 18, 2021.

He has quickly climbed the ranks in the Chilean naval high commande since 2010 when he was appointed a Commodore.

He was appointed as a Counter admiral in 2011 and was he was awarded the rank of Vice admiral by the Government in 2015.

On June 2, 2017, he was appointed as the new commander in chief of the Chilean Navy and was promoted to an Admiral 16 days later on June 18, he had been part of the high command for only 7 years by that point.
