= Beltrán Urenda =

Chilean marine and politician

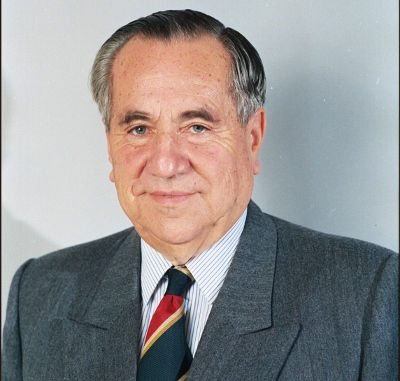

Member of the Senate of Chile
- In office 11 March 1990 – 11 March 2002
- Preceded by: Circunscription
- Succeeded by: Jorge Arancibia
- Constituency: 6th Circumscription

Personal details
- Born: 29 February 1920 Concón, Chile
- Died: 22 June 2013 (aged 93) Viña del Mar, Chile
- Party: Conservative Party (1944–1948); Traditionalist Conservative Party (1948–1953); United Conservative Party (1953–1966); National Party (1966–1973); Unión Demócrata Independiente (1991–2013)
- Spouse: María Elena Salamanca
- Children: Eight
- Parent(s): Carlos Urenda Trigo; Florencia Zegers Borgoño
- Education: Federico Santa María Technical University (No degree); University of Valparaíso (LL.B)
- Occupation: Politician
- Profession: Lawyer

Beltrán Urenda Zegers (born 29 February 1920 – 22 June 2013) was a Chilean politician, lawyer and entrepreneur who served as Senator of the Republic of Chile from the return to the democracy on 11 March 1990 to 11 March 2002.

Urenda was a member and councillor of the Valparaíso Bar Association. He served as president of the Lukas Foundation and the Edmundo Eluchans Malherbe Foundation. Urenda also was a lifetime member of the Lions Club of Valparaíso and Viña del Mar and honorary president of the Compañía Chilena de Navegación Interoceánica (CCNI).

On 12 November 2009, he received an academic distinction from Andrés Bello University, being awarded the Medal of Honour by the Rector, Rolando Kelly, in recognition of his contribution to the development of the country.

== Biography ==
=== Family and youth ===
He was married to María Elena Salamanca Quaheir and was the father of eight children. He was the uncle of Edmundo Eluchans Urenda, former President of the Chamber of Deputies.

=== Professional career ===
He completed his primary and secondary education at the Colegio de los Sagrados Corazones in Viña del Mar. He pursued engineering studies at the Federico Santa María Technical University and later entered the Faculty of Law at the University of Chile, Valparaíso campus. He qualified as a lawyer on 21 March 1946.

During his university years, he showed an early inclination toward public participation and was elected director, secretary, and president of the Law Students’ Association.

He served as Professor of Commercial Law for a period of eight years and practiced law as an associate judge (abogado integrante) of the Court of Appeals of Valparaíso.

He was a member of the governing boards of the University of Valparaíso and the Federico Santa María Technical University.

In the business sector, he was especially active in maritime and shipping activities. He served as president of the Compañía Chilena de Navegación Interoceánica, director of ALAMAR, and member of the board of SONAP. He was also president of the National Association of Shipowners.

He was the principal partner of the law firm Urenda y Cía..

== Political career ==
He joined the Independent Democratic Union (UDI) on 9 April 1991.
