= Arturo Merino Núñez =

Chilean Air Force officer (born 1960)

General of the Air (R) Arturo Merino
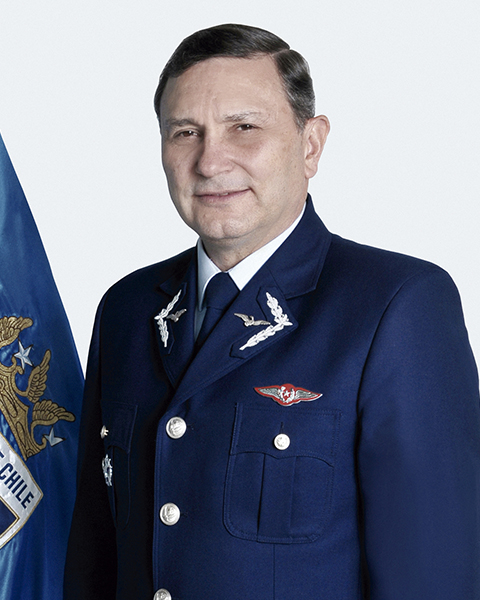

Commander-in-Chief of the Chilean Air Force
- In office 5 November 2018 – 5 November 2022
- President: Sebastián Piñera; Gabriel Boric
- Preceded by: Jorge Robles Mella
- Succeeded by: Hugo Rodríguez González

Personal details
- Born: 28 July 1960 (age 66) Santiago, Chile
- Spouse: Carolina Benavente Courbis
- Children: 3
- Education: Captain Manuel Ávalos Prado Aviation School; Air War Academy

Military service
- Allegiance: Chile
- Branch/service: Chilean Air Force
- Rank: General of the Air
- Commands: Chilean Air Force

Arturo Bernardo Gabriel Merino Núñez (born 28 July 1960) is a retired Chilean Air Force officer who served as Commander-in-Chief of the Chilean Air Force (FACh) from 2018 to 2022. A fighter pilot, he previously served as Chief of the Joint Staff of the Chilean Armed Forces and held several senior operational and command appointments within the Air Force.

== Early life and education ==
Merino was born in Santiago, Chile, on 28 July 1960. He is the son of Commodore Arturo Merino Benítez, a pioneer of Chilean military and civil aviation who served as the first Commander-in-Chief of the Chilean Air Force and was instrumental in the establishment of LAN-Chile.

Merino entered the Captain Manuel Ávalos Prado Aviation School in January 1977 and graduated in December 1979. He subsequently specialised as a fighter pilot and qualified as a staff officer at the Air War Academy.

During his career, Merino completed further professional and command training and became a military professor. His professional development was principally oriented towards combat aviation, command and joint military planning.

He is married to Carolina Benavente Courbis and has three children.

== Air Force career ==
Merino developed much of his career in combat aviation and held command appointments in several Air Force units, particularly in northern Chile.

Among his senior assignments, he served as executive director of the International Air and Space Fair (FIDAE) in 2006. From 2008 to 2009, he served as Defence Attaché to the Permanent Mission of Chile to the United Nations in New York City.

In 2010, Merino was appointed director of the Captain Manuel Ávalos Prado Aviation School. He subsequently became Commander-in-Chief of the I Air Brigade at Iquique, one of the principal combat formations of the Chilean Air Force.

Merino was promoted to Air Brigade General in 2011 and to Aviation General in 2013. He served as commander of the Combat Command and later as Commander-in-Chief of the Northern Joint Command, responsible for coordinating joint military capabilities in northern Chile.

In December 2015, Merino became Chief of the Joint Staff of the Chilean Armed Forces. In that position, he was responsible for joint military planning and coordination between the Chilean Army, Chilean Navy and Chilean Air Force. He remained in the post until his appointment as Commander-in-Chief of the Air Force in 2018.

== Commander-in-Chief of the Air Force ==
On 17 October 2018, President Sebastián Piñera designated Merino as the next Commander-in-Chief of the Chilean Air Force, succeeding General Jorge Robles Mella. He formally assumed command and was promoted to General of the Air on 5 November 2018.

His tenure encompassed the 2019–2020 Chilean protests and the COVID-19 pandemic in Chile, during which the Air Force deployed personnel and aircraft in support of the state and civilian authorities under constitutional states of exception.

During the pandemic, the Air Force implemented its Seventh Air Bridge, a large-scale logistical operation that transported medical supplies and personnel and evacuated critically ill COVID-19 patients between different regions of Chile. The operation was intended to relieve pressure on regional healthcare systems by transferring patients to hospitals with available capacity.

Merino's command also oversaw the strengthening of the Air Force's strategic transport and surveillance capabilities. Projects undertaken or completed during his tenure included the acquisition of three additional C-130 Hercules transport aircraft, upgrades to the Hercules fleet, the incorporation of two Gulfstream IV aircraft and the acquisition of two Boeing E-3 Sentry airborne early-warning aircraft.

The service also expanded the capabilities of its Hermes 900 unmanned aerial systems. In parallel, Merino's administration continued the development of the National Satellite System and promoted institutional planning focused on strategic capabilities, organisational culture and integration with Chilean society.

Merino completed his four-year term on 5 November 2022 and retired from active service. He was succeeded by General Hugo Rodríguez González.
