= Chilean Armed Forces =

- Fuerzas Armadas de Chile
- Flag of Ministry of National Defense
- Founded: 1810
- Service branches: Chilean Army; Chilean Navy; Chilean Air Force
- Headquarters: Santiago

Leadership
- Commander-in-chief: President Jose Antonio Kast
- Minister of Defense: Fernando Barros
- Chief of the Joint Chiefs of Staff: José Nogueira León

Personnel
- Military age: 18
- Active personnel: 80,000
- Reserve personnel: 40,000

Expenditure
- Percent of GDP: 1.9% (2021)

Industry
- Domestic suppliers: FAMAE; ENAER; ASMAR; DTS; SISDEF; DESA; LINKTRONIC; Detroit Chile
- Foreign suppliers: Australia; Brazil; Canada; Czech Republic; France; Germany; Israel; Italy; Poland; Sweden; Taiwan; United Kingdom; United States

Related articles
- Ranks: Military ranks and insignia of Chile

The Chilean Armed Forces (Spanish: Fuerzas Armadas de Chile) is the unified military force of Chile, comprising the Chilean Army, Air Force, and Navy. The president of Chile is the commander-in-chief of the military, and formulates policy through the Minister of Defence. In recent years and after several major reequipment programs, the Chilean Armed Forces have become one of the most technologically advanced and professional armed forces in Latin America. The Chilean Army is mostly supplied with equipment from Germany, the United States, Brazil, Israel, France, and Spain.

== Structure ==
=== Army ===
The current commander-in-chief of the Chilean Army is General de Ejército Sr. Javier Iturriaga del Campo. The 46,350-person army is organized under six military administrative regions and six divisional headquarters. The forces include one special forces brigade, four armoured brigades, one armoured detachment, three motorized brigades, two motorized detachments, four mountain detachments and one aviation brigade. The army operates German Leopard 1 and 2 tanks as its main battle tanks, including 170+ Leopard 2A4 and 115 Leopard 1. The army has approximately 40,000 reservists.

=== Navy ===
Admiral Juan Andrés De La Maza Larraín directs the 19,800-person Chilean Navy, including 3,600 Marines. Of the fleet of 66 surface vessels, eight are major combatant ships and they are based in Valparaíso. The navy operates its own aircraft for transport and patrol; there are no fighters or bomber aircraft but they have attack helicopters. The Navy also operates four submarines based in Talcahuano.

=== Air Force ===
General Hugo Rodríguez González heads 11,050-strong Chilean Air Force. Air assets are distributed among five air brigades headquartered in Iquique, Antofagasta, Santiago, Puerto Montt, and Punta Arenas. The Air Force also operates an airbase on King George Island, Antarctica.

== See also ==
- Chilean Army order of battle
