= Barrionuevo =

Barrionuevo is a Spanish surname. Notable people with the surname include:

- Carlos Barrionuevo (1977–2015), Argentine footballer
- Claudia Barrionuevo (born 1991), Argentine model and beauty pageant winner
- Ezequiel Barrionuevo (born 1986), Argentine footballer
- Federico Barrionuevo (born 1981), Argentine footballer
- Horacio Barrionuevo (born 1939), Argentine footballer
- José Barrionuevo (born 1942), Spanish politician
- Luis Barrionuevo (born 1949), Argentine high jumper
- Noel Barrionuevo (born 1984), Argentine field hockey player
- Oscar Barrionuevo (born 1963), Argentine sprinter
- Raúl Armando Barrionuevo (1913–1996), Chilean farmer and politician
- Walter Barrionuevo (born 1954), Argentine politician
