= Patricio Santamaría =

Chilean judge

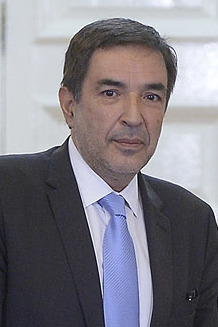

President of the Servel
- In office 21 August 2013 – 27 December 2021
- Preceded by: Juan Emilio Cheyre
- Succeeded by: Andrés Tagle

General Undersecretary of Government of Chile
- In office 6 March 2003 – 24 August 2005
- President: Ricardo Lagos
- Preceded by: María Eliana Arntz
- Succeeded by: Jorge Navarrete Poblete

Personal details
- Born: 5 November 1955 (age 70) Santiago, Chile
- Party: Christian Democratic Party
- Education: Pontifical Catholic University of Valparaíso (BA); University of the Republic (PhD)
- Profession: Lawyer

Patricio Francisco Santamaría Mutis (born 5 November 1955) is a Chilean lawyer.
