= Juan Emilio Cheyre =

Chilean general (born 1947)

General (R) Juan Emilio Cheyre
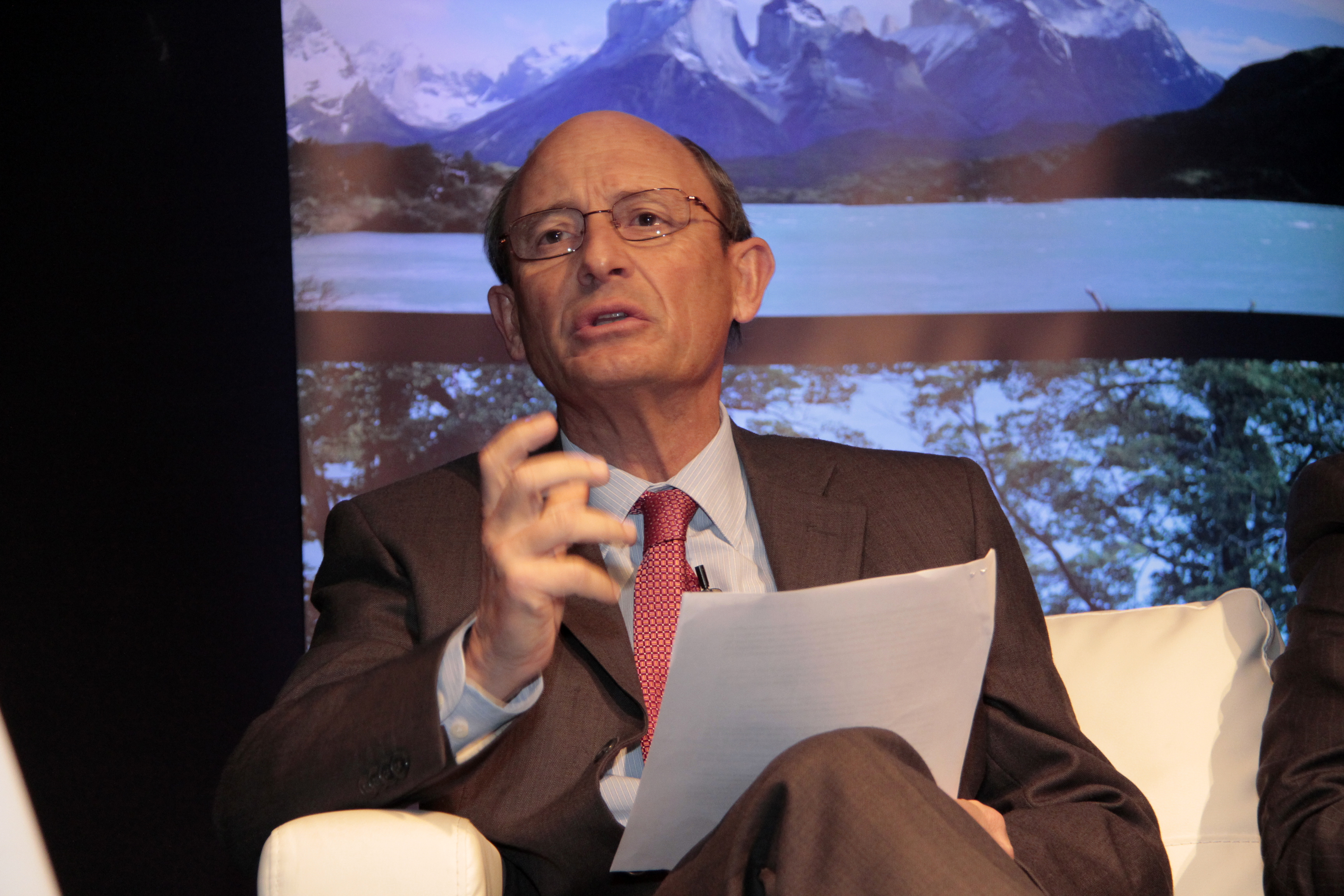
- Cheyre in 2004

Commander-in-Chief of the Chilean Army
- In office 10 March 2002 – 9 March 2006
- President: Ricardo Lagos; Michelle Bachelet
- Preceded by: Ricardo Izurieta
- Succeeded by: Oscar Izurieta Ferrer

Intendant of the Araucanía Region
- In office 15 December 1987 – 11 March 1990
- President: Augusto Pinochet
- Preceded by: Gabriel Alliende
- Succeeded by: Raúl Barrionuevo

Personal details
- Born: 10 October 1947 (age 78) Santiago, Chile

Military service
- Allegiance: Chile
- Branch/service: Chilean Army
- Rank: Army General
- Commands: Chilean Army

Juan Emilio Cheyre Espinosa (born October 10, 1947) is a retired Chilean Army General. He was Commander-in-Chief of the Chilean Army from 2002 to 2006. As Commander-in-Chief he attempted to distance the Army from former General Augusto Pinochet, and condemned the human rights abuses of Pinochet's dictatorship.

In 1973 he handed over a two-year-old child, whose parents had been murdered by the army, to a nunnery.

== Career ==
In 2003, Cheyre as Commander-in-Chief of the Army issued an historically relevant document titled "Chilean Army: End of a Vision," in which he stated that "never again" could the circumstances that led Chile to the collapse of its democracy be met.

Cheyre was succeeded as Commander-in-Chief by Army General Óscar Izurieta Ferrer on March 10, 2006. He worked later as an academic at the Pontifical Catholic University of Chile. In 2013 he was appointed as president of the "Servicio de Registro Electoral", but a few months later he withdrew from his office as a consequence of the controversy surrounding his acts in 1973 when he handed over a child.

== Prosecution ==
On July 8, 2016, it was reported that Cheyre was jailed earlier in the week for alleged involvement in the killing of 15 people during the first days of Pinochet's rule in 1973. On November 9, 2018, Cheyre was convicted for complicity in the deaths of 15 left wing activists in September 1973 and was sentenced to three years and a day of house arrest. Ariosto Lapostol, who was Cheyre's commanding officer at this time, was also convicted for the killings and was sentenced to 15 years in prison.

== Qualifications ==
Some of Cheyre's academic qualifications include:

- Licenciate in Military Sciences (Army War Academy)
- Master of Science in Political Science (Pontifical Catholic University of Chile)
- Master of Military Sciences (Army War Academy — it corresponds to the regular course every officer should accomplish, see Licenciate above)
- Ph.D. in Political Science and Sociology (Universidad Complutense de Madrid)
