= Gregorio Rodríguez Tascón =

Chilean general

Gregorio Rodríguez Tascón (1901–1980) was a Chilean Army general known for his work on geopolitics and his presidency of the Chilean Commission on Border Limits (Spanish: Comisión Chilena de Límites) where he dealt with the Laguna del Desierto issue.

Heading the chair of geography and geopolitics at the Chilean War Academy he lectured several outstanding students like René Schneider, Carlos Prats and Gustavo Serrano Mahns whom he at times invited home for dinner. Another of his students was Augusto Pinochet who given his interest in geopolitics was granted a slot an assistant teacher in the geography and geolitics chair, and later Pinochet succeeded him in the chair. Relatives recall Gregorio Rodríguez Tascón considered that Pinochet's book Geopolítica (1968) contained plagiarism of a 1949 conference he had held and left Pinochet's request for a foreword to the book unanswered. He retired from the army in 1961 but continued to work for the Chilean state as a specialist on border issues, in particular the Laguna del Desierto case.
