= Political violence in Chile =

The Chilean government has a long-standing history of using political violence against its own citizens. Violence has been used by the government against its people under three different styles of government: parliamentary, presidential and military rule. While Chile has remained stable in the long run, the country has been subjected to intense periods of state sponsored violence.

== Parliamentary Era ==
=== Background ===
The Parliamentary Era of the Chilean government began soon after the Chilean Civil War of 1891, which was fought between Congress, supported by the Chilean Navy and President Balmaceda, supported by the Chilean Army. The war broke out due to President José Manuel Balmaceda’s large amount of borrowing for public works initiatives right before a large economic recession hit. After the recession, fearing that the President would not take appropriate action, the congress censured his cabinet and refused to pass his appropriations bill. As retaliation, the president vowed to pass the previous year's budget and congress found him in violation of the constitution. Congress than took over the navy and the northern customs house that controlled a majority of the countries revenue. Realizing that he couldn't win President Balmaceda took refuge in the Argentine embassy and committed suicide on September 18, 1891, which was the day his term was set to expire. After congress won the civil war, they set up a parliamentary type government where the congress had considerable power over the president.

=== Occurrences ===
While the Civil War of 1891 was not during the Parliamentary Era, it is because it led to the creation of the Parliamentary style of government that warrants its inclusion in this section.

For the most part the Civil War was a normal conflict that would not be labeled an act of political violence. Congress, with the support of the Navy and the Help of General Emil Körner had a larger military force than that of the President, who was supported by the Army. The Army had notable success with the sinking of the ship Blanco Encalada, but the Navy had the upper hand and after landing in Quintero in late August 1891 with over 9,000 men, took control after victories in both Concón and La Placilla. The conflict that does fall under the guidelines of political violence is the Lo Cañas Massacre. A group of young men from wealthy families were meeting in Lo Cañas to create a guerrilla band in opposition to President Balmaceda, while meeting the group was unexpectedly attacked by Army troops. Most of the young men were killed when they were attacked; the surviving men were subjected to brutal treatment. “The wounded were bayoneted and sabred to death and their bodies were mutilated and burned.” Those who were taken prisoner were marched to a nearby town, but were turned back to the camp for unknown reasons. One prisoner, Don Carlos Walker Martinez was tied to a tree and tortured by being repeatedly cut with a sword and when the Army could not extract any information they broke both of his legs. Remaining silent, the troops poured a flammable liquid on him and set him on fire; he died an hour later. Other members of the guerrilla band had their abdomens cut open and their organs strung on the trees, their eyes and tongues cut out, and their ears and noses cut off.

== Presidential Era ==
=== Background ===
The Presidential Era began in 1925 after years of political turmoil. In early 1925 President Jorge Alessandri Rodríguez put all of his efforts in reforming the constitution by creating the “Grand Consultative Commission.” Their reforms included: the creation of a stronger executive, denying the chamber and senate the power to depose ministries, giving the chamber power to bring accusations against the ministers and president in front of the senate, lengthening the presidential term to six years, creating election by direct vote and separating church and state. These reforms marked the end of the Parliamentary style of government and the beginning of the Presidential system.

=== Occurrences ===
One of the main cases of political violence in the Presidential Era is the Nitrate Massacre in June 1925. Rising tensions between the nitrate workers, the government and the nitrate companies, due to unfair wages and work conditions, led to various strikes. In June 1925 the police interrupted a nitrate labor meeting in Alto San Alto, the day before a general strike was to be held. After an altercation two policemen were killed. The nitrate workers fled to different camps, La Coruña being the primary meeting place. Three different accounts exist as to what started the massacre. Military reports state, workers formed under the direction of Carlos Garrido, an anarchist, who under the direction from the Workers’ Federation, called on the nitrate workers to fight. Another account claims the conflict came after the wife of a miner was beaten by a store manager and in retaliation the husband stabbed the manager. Leftist political parties claim the government incited the conflict by allowing the nitrate workers to buy as much alcohol as they wished. Then, after the start of the strike, prohibiting the sale of alcohol lead the drunken workers to fire shots at a store manager. Whatever account is true, certainty rests in the account of the government's reaction. A telegram from General Antonio de la Guarda to President Alessandri explains that when the government sent in regiments of cannons and machine guns to subdue the miners, the nitrate workers threw sticks of dynamite at the army. The army then bombarded the miners who eventually surrendered, but only after fifty-nine of their fellow workers were killed. In the following weeks the military rounded up nitrate workers from several camps and nearby towns, shooting some on sight, while imprisoning hundreds more who were then subjected to military justice.

Another source of political violence of this era stems from the Pisagua Prison Camp. While Pisagua was officially a prison, in 1943 it was employed as a detention center for Axis nationals, from 1947-48 it was used as a concentration camp for communists and homosexual men, and in 1956 it was used as a prison camp for political and labor leaders. While Pisagua is infamous for the mass execution in 1973 under Pinochet (see the Military Era section below), during the Presidential Era it gained notoriety for the period between 1947 and 1948. In the fall of 1947, the government gathered and sent over 600 people to Pisagua, including members of the Communist Party, striking coal miners and their families, homosexual men and those in opposition to President Gabriel González Videla. Due to the lack of housing facilities, food, and inability to provide adequate health care, a number of labor and political leaders, as well as children died from male nourishment and deficient medical care. Future Chilean leader Augusto Pinochet was a guard at Pisagua during this time, who later stated that his time there molded him and he lauded the institution for having the discipline the nation needed that the military could provide.

== Military Era ==
=== Background ===
The Military Era was born out of the 1973 coup to overthrow President Salvador Allende, constructed which was constructed by Commander-in-Chief Augusto Pinochet. Even before Allende's election to the Presidency, many forces were working against him. Most notably the United States, who, through the work of former United States Secretary of State Henry Kissinger and his “40 Committee,” tried to stop Allende, a Marxist, from being elected president. Richard Nixon's administration then cut aid to Chile from $592 million under the previous president to a mere $22 million, paving the way for economic turmoil.

Further assisting Pinoche's ascension to power was an incident surrounding then Commander-in-Chief Carlos Prats. Prats resigned in late August 1973, after he aimed his gun at a woman in a crowd, which incited a riot outside his house. With Prats’ resignation, Augusto Pinochet was named Commander-in-Chief.

On the morning of September 11, 1973, the military coup occurred. Under Pinochet's direction the military took over the nation's radio stations, announcing to the Chilean people that they were taking control of the country and offering Allende the opportunity to surrender and a plane. Refusing, Allende went to the National Palace where he delivered his final address to the Chilean people at 9:30AM. Shortly thereafter the military bombed the National Palace and the former president was found dead due to a gunshot wound. It is still not known if it was self-inflicted or not. Pinochet quickly rose to power, denouncing all politicians as self-serving and promoting the military as the true patriots of Chile.

=== Occurrences ===
Immediately following the coup, the military government under Pinochet imposed a curfew, enforced by the military patrolling the streets with sub-machine guns. Soon after, they started sweeping the poorest sections of Chile, detaining people just to intimidate them. The government also gathered political enemies and sympathizers of Allende's government and sending them to detention centers. Through the course of his rule, approximately 3,000 people “disappeared.”

The two most notable uses of violence under Pinochet's rule were through his creation of the National Intelligence Service (Dirección de Inteligencia Nacional, DINA) and his use of detention centers, especially Pisagua. After the coup in September 1973, Pinochet created the National Intelligence Service, also known as DINA. One of their primary goals was to eliminate Chilean citizens who were speaking out while in exile, specifically targeting former party and labor leaders. In 1974, DINA carried out a mission to execute the former Commander-in-Chief, Carlos Prats. While in Buenos Aires, a bomb attached to the bottom of Prats’ car went off, killing both him and his wife. Then in 1975, DINA attempted to assassinate the Christian Democratic Leader, Bernardo Leighton. He was shot while in Rome, but recovered from his injury. The last notable case occurred in 1976 when DINA assassinated Orlando Letelier, the former Chilean Ambassador to the United States by attaching a bomb to his car while he was in Washington, D.C. The assassination of former Ambassador Letelier triggered an investigation by United States Justice Department, who were able to prove that the assassination was orchestrated by DINA and conducted by both DINA operatives and Cuban exiles. With the world focused on the actions of DINA, Pinochet dissolved the agency, only to create another agency in its place shortly after.

The violent actions that the government sanctioned within Chilean borders were greater than the political violence carried out by Pinochet abroad through the National Intelligence Agency. After the coup, the military rounded up individuals and families who were thought to be in opposition to the Pinochet government and brought them to the detention center in Pisagua. There, citizens were subjected to summary trials, executions and torture to extract any information they had on opposition efforts. “The military’s methods of torture included systematic beatings, electric shock, burning, the use of various hanging positions and forced postures, immersion, and mock executions.” In total 600 people never left the detention center, having been either executed or sentenced to life terms.

Dr. Sheila Cassidy was a notable example of torture condoned by the Chilean government, and shows the brutality that was inflicted on so many people. Dr. Cassidy, a British surgeon and the daughter of an Air Vice Marshal in the Royal Air Force was arrested by DINA agents after she treated Nelson Gutiérrez, of the Revolutionary Left Movement, for a leg wound caused by a bullet. After withstanding the first round of torture, she lied to her captors, refusing to give up information on Gutiérrez or the members of the Catholic Church that brought her to him. After bringing her to various locations across town that she had given them, she saw men approaching and pleaded for help, prompting the DINA agents to put her through another round of torture, except this time more intense. Dr. Cassidy was stripped naked and tied down to a metal bed frame; the agents then inserted an electrode into her and had another electrode that was used on the rest of her body. Dr. Cassidy states in her book, “From the first moment it was different. The pain was appalling…Unable to cry out and with my hands nearly paralyzed I could call for relief only through the upward movement of my finger and this they ignored, filling me with a desperation the like of which I have never known.”
