= The Pinochet File =

The Pinochet File: A Declassified Dossier on Atrocity and Accountability
- Author: Peter Kornbluh
- Cover artist: Hall Smyth
- Language: English
- Genre: Historical
- Publisher: The New Press
- Publication date: September 11, 2003
- Publication place: United States
- Media type: Print (hardcover and paperback)
- Pages: 587
- ISBN: 1-56584-586-2 (Hardback) 1-56584-936-1 (Paperback)

The Pinochet File is a National Security Archive book written by Peter Kornbluh covering over approximately two decades of declassified documents, from the Central Intelligence Agency (CIA), Defense Intelligence Agency (DIA), White House, and United States Department of State, regarding American covert activities in Chile. It is based on more than 24,000 previously classified documents that were released as part of the Chilean Declassification Project during the Clinton administration, between June 1999 and June 2000.

== Significance ==
The Pinochet File was selected as one of "The Best Books of 2003" in the nonfiction category by the Los Angeles Times. The New Yorker said, "The evidence that Kornbluh has gathered is overwhelming." in its review. The Newsweek review of The Pinochet File describes it as "... actually two distinct but intersecting books. The first is a narrative account of the Nixon administration's involvement in Chile. Its mission was to make sure that Allende's election in 1970 didn't serve as a model for leftist candidates elsewhere. The second consists of the reproduction of hundreds of salient intelligence documents released in 1999 and 2000 in response to requests by President Bill Clinton."

The inclusion of key source documents allows the reader not only to corroborate Kornbluh's findings, but to acquire a flavor of the extent of U.S. covert activities within Chile, and to understand the tenor of conversation in the White House and CIA regarding Salvador Allende's presidency. While the U.S. claimed to support Chile and its democratic election process, the documents show intricate and extensive attempts first to prevent Allende from being elected, and then to overthrow him with a coup d'état.

The coup d'état required first removing the commander in chief of the Chilean armed forces (General René Schneider), who opposed military interference in political situations. He was assassinated by CIA-funded coup plotters (retired General Roberto Viaux and active duty General Camilo Valenzuela).

Once Augusto Pinochet took power, his human rights violations were tolerated, even though the U.S. knew that thousands of people had been detained and American citizens Charles Horman and Frank Teruggi murdered. The CIA fostered an extensive cover-up of its involvement in fomenting the coup, including dissembling to the Church Committee. The White House also withheld key documents.

Subsequently, the role of the US in this period of history was not correctly understood based solely on the findings released at that time. Furthermore, extensive black propaganda, especially in El Mercurio, shaped world perceptions of Allende, essentially painting him as a Communist pawn and portraying the wreckage of the Chilean economy as due to his decisions.

In contrast, the declassified documents show that Richard Nixon enacted an "invisible blockade" in concert with American multinational corporations and international banking organizations, which were pressured to withhold loan refinancing. Consequently, much of the history that has been written without access to these documents may need to be reexamined, as Kornbluh discusses in the book's introduction:

Indeed, the documents contain new information on virtually every major issue, episode, and scandal that pockmark this controversial era. They cover events such as Project FUBELT, the CIA's covert action to block Salvador Allende from becoming president of Chile in the fall of 1970; the assassination of Chilean commander-in-chief René Schneider; U.S. strategy and operations to destabilize the Allende government; the degree of American support for the coup; the postcoup executions of American citizens; the origins and operations of Pinochet's secret police, DINA, CIA ties to DINA chief Manuel Contreras, Operation Condor, the terrorist car-bombing of Orlando Letelier and Ronni Moffitt in Washington, D.C., the murder by burning of Washington resident Rodrigo Rojas, and Pinochet's final efforts to thwart a transition to civilian rule. (p.xvii-xviii)

== Declassified documents reproduced in the book ==
The inclusion of key source documents provide a rare behind-the-scenes view of covert regime change in operation. Key documents from the CIA, United States National Security Council (NSC), White House, DIA, and State Department were declassified in the year 2000. The more than 24,000 records correspond to an average of about three records per day gathered over two decades and Kornbluh's analysis was not complete and in print until 2003. Reports based on documents released prior to 2000 are necessarily incomplete and hew more closely to the interpretation the Nixon White House disseminated via its black propaganda programs in Chile.

Not all of the documents included are from the CIA. The book reproduces 114 documents, using 237 pages, from the following sources:

- Central Intelligence Agency, 37 documents.
- United States Department of State, 22 documents.
- United States Embassy, 15 documents.
- U.S. National Security Council, 10 documents.
- Defense Intelligence Agency, 10 documents.
- Federal Bureau of Investigation, 6 documents.
- The White House, 5 documents.
- Secretary of State, 3 documents.
- Department of Defense, 2 documents
- Dirección de Inteligencia Nacional, 2 documents.
- Treasury Department, 1 document.
- Bow Street Magistrates' Court, 1 document.

== Publishing information ==
- Kornbluh, Peter, The Pinochet File: A Declassified Dossier on Atrocity and Accountability, The New Press, 2003. ISBN 1-56584-936-1.
