= Peter Kornbluh =

American academic

- Kornbluh in 2026
- Born: 1956 (age 69–70); Ann Arbor, Michigan
- Employer: National Security Archive

Peter Kornbluh (born 1956) is a senior analyst at the National Security Archive, where he has worked since 1986. Kornbluh has served as the director of both the Chile Documentation Project and the Cuba Documentation Project.

== Early life and education ==
Kornbluh grew up in Ann Arbor, Michigan, where he graduated from Pioneer High School in 1974. He earned a B.A. from Brandeis University in Massachusetts in 1978.

== Career ==
From 1990 to 1999, Kornbluh held an adjunct assistant professorship of international and public affairs at Columbia University. Kornbluh won a 1990 James Aronson Award honorable mention for writing on Central America in The New Yorker. In the early 1990s he worked with Malcolm Byrne documenting the Iran Contra scandal.

Kornbluh's work at the National Security Archive has included efforts related to the U.S. government's historical foreign policy. Notably, he has contributed to the declassification of documents that offer insight into U.S. government's support for the Pinochet dictatorship in Chile. Kornbluh has authored and co-authored several publications. One of his significant works is The Pinochet File: A Declassified Dossier on Atrocity and Accountability, which compiles a selection of declassified documents related to U.S. policy in Chile from 1970 to 1990. Kenneth Maxwell wrote a review in the November/December 2003 issue of Foreign Affairs, creating a controversy about Henry Kissinger's involvement in Operation Condor. He also co-authored the book Back Channel to Cuba: The Hidden History of Negotiations between Washington and Havana with William LeoGrande.

Kornbluh contributes to The Nation magazine. His articles have been published in a variety of outlets, including The New Yorker, The New York Times, The Washington Post, and Los Angeles Times. He is frequently featured as a commentator on television and radio programs such as CBS's 60 Minutes, PBS's NewsHour, The Charlie Rose Show, and NPR's All Things Considered and Fresh Air with Terry Gross.

In December 2014, Kornbluh testified for five hours before the tribunal of the historical “Plan Condor” trial in Buenos Aires Argentina. Based on the research outlined in his book (The Pinochet File), Kornbluh described the structure of the Chilean National Intelligence Directorate (DINA), its leading role in organizing Operation Condor, and the assassination of exiled Chilean Foreign Minister Orlando Letelier in Washington DC in 1976. In May 2016, the verdict of the tribunal, the "Tribunal Oral Federal N°1," declared 15 convictions directly related to the forced disappearance of 106 victims.

In October 2017, Kornbluh was honored with the "Order of Bernardo O'Higgins" in recognition of his significant contributions to Chilean society. The award, bestowed by the Chilean government, was presented by Ambassador Juan Gabriel Valdes who commended Kornbluh's exemplary leadership and enduring commitment to the declassification of secret documents pertaining to the coup and the regime led by General Augusto Pinochet. The ambassador acknowledged Kornbluh's instrumental role in spearheading efforts spanning several decades.

== Publications ==
=== Books ===
- 1987. Nicaragua: The Price of Intervention (Institute for Policy Studies)
- 1989. (with Michael T. Klare). Low Intensity Warfare: How the USA Fights Wars Without Declaring Them (Methuen Publishing Ltd ISBN 0-413-61590-1)
- 1992. (with Lawrence Chang). The Cuban Missile Crisis, 1962 (The New Press, ISBN 1565840194)
- 1993. (with Malcolm Byrne). The Iran-Contra Scandal: The Declassified History (The New Press, 1993 ISBN 978-1-56584-047-8)
- 1998. (with James G. Blight). Politics of Illusion : The Bay of Pigs Invasion Reexamined (Boulder, Colorado: Lynne Rienner publishers)
- 1998. Bay of Pigs Declassified: The Secret CIA Report on the Invasion of Cuba (The New Press. ISBN 1-56584-494-7)
- 2003. The Pinochet File: A Declassified Dossier on Atrocity and Accountability (The New Press).
- 2004. (with translator David León) Pinochet: Los Archivos Secretos (Editorial Crítica)
- 2013. (revised and updated). The Pinochet File: A Declassified Dossier on Atrocity and Accountability (The New Press. ISBN 1595589120)
- 2013. (revised and updated; with translator David León) Pinochet: Los Archivos Secretos (Editorial Crítica. ISBN 8498925878)
- 2014. (with William M. LeoGrande). Back Channel to Cuba: The Hidden History of Negotiations between Washington and Havana (University of North Carolina Press. ISBN 978-1469626604)
