= Ricardo Izurieta =

Chilean general (1943–2014)

General (R) Ricardo Izurieta

Commander-in-Chief of the Chilean Army
- In office 11 March 1998 – 10 March 2002
- President: Eduardo Frei Ruiz-Tagle; Ricardo Lagos
- Preceded by: Augusto Pinochet
- Succeeded by: Juan Emilio Cheyre

Personal details
- Born: 11 June 1943 Santiago, Chile
- Died: 17 August 2014 (aged 71) Santiago, Chile
- Education: Libertador Bernardo O'Higgins Military Academy

Military service
- Allegiance: Chile
- Branch/service: Chilean Army
- Rank: Army General
- Commands: Chilean Army

Ricardo Edmundo Izurieta Caffarena (11 June 1943 – 17 August 2014) was a Chilean military officer and Commander-in-Chief of the Army between 1998 and 2002. Izurieta was a key figure in managing civil-military relations as Chile worked to consolidate democracy in the years after the military government of Augusto Pinochet.

A cavalry officer by training, Izurieta was a captain at the time of the September 1973 coup against the government of Salvador Allende, but played no substantial role in the coup. During his career he served as a military professor, Director of the Academia de Guerra del Ejército, and military attache to Israel and the United States. Thirty years' Pinochet's junior, Izurieta took command of the Chilean Army from Pinochet in March 1998 and was the senior military figure during the 1998-2000 Caso Pinochet, in which the former dictator was placed under house arrest in London under indictment by a Spanish judge. Izurieta met Pinochet's plane upon his return from London and embraced the aging dictator as he stood up from the wheelchair in which he had remained in London.

Izurieta played an important role in moving the Chilean armed forces beyond the Pinochet era and working with Concertacion governments to address the legacy of human rights abuses. Izurieta proved a controversial figure to the left for the respect he showed to Pinochet and to the right for not defending Pinochet from those seeking justice for the brutality of the dictatorship. Izurieta and his 1998-2002 term at the head of the Chilean Army navigated such a critical period in the consolidation of Chilean democracy that some termed Izurieta an "eje de cambio" or axis of change for post-authoritarian Chile.

== Awards ==
Order of Military Merit (Grand Officer; Brazil)
