= Orders, decorations, and medals of Chile =

The Chilean honours system provides a means for the Government of Chile to reward gallantry, achievement, or service, by both Chileans and non-citizens. The honours system consists of three types of award: orders, decorations and medals. Membership of an Order (in one of its various grades) is conferred to recognise merit in terms of achievement and service. Decorations are conferred to recognise specific deeds of gallantry, bravery, distinguished or meritorious service. Medals are conferred to recognise long and/or valuable service and/or good conduct. Awards to non-citizens are usually only made where the gallantry, achievement or service has advanced Chilean interests in some way. The honours conferred by the Chilean Republic can be divided into two groups: civil and military. Military honours are conferred by the different branches of the Armed Forces of Chile. Civil honours are conferred by the President of Chile or, in some instances, by the government minister relevant to the particular honour.

== Civil orders ==
=== Order of Merit ===
(Spanish: Orden al Mérito)

The Order of Merit of Chile (Spanish: Orden al Mérito de Chile) was established in 1906, as a successor order to the Legion of Merit, to 'reward outstanding civil service to the Republic of Chile provided by foreign nationals'. The order is governed by the Council of the Order of Merit of Chile. The President of Chile is the Chair of the council. The remaining councilors comprise the Minister of Foreign Affairs (Chancellor of the Order), the Secretary of Foreign Affairs, the Director General Foreign Policy and the Director General Ceremonial and Protocol (Secretary of the Order) while the Deputy Director Protocol serves as the Secretary of the Order. The order consists of five classes:

- Collar (Spanish: Collar), I* Class
- Grand Cross (Spanish: Gran Cruz), I Class
- Grand Officer (Spanish: Gran Oficial), II Class
- Commander (Spanish: Comendador), III Class
- Officer (Spanish: Oficial), IV Class
- Knight (Spanish: Caballero), V Class

=== Order of Bernardo O'Higgins ===
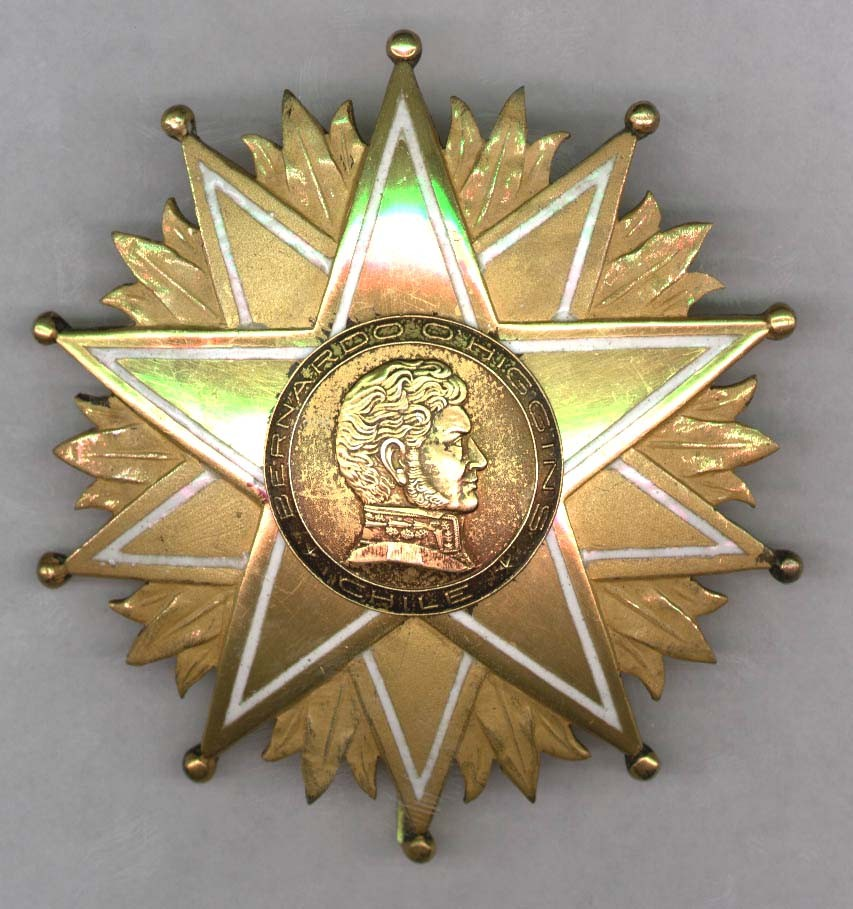
Order of Bernado O'Higgins I Class Breast Star

The Order of Bernado O'Higgins (Spanish: Orden de Bernardo O'Higgins) was established in 1956 as an extension of the Order of Merit of Chile in order to recognise foreign nationals for their 'outstanding contribution to the arts, sciences, education, industry, trade or social and humanitarian cooperation'. The Order of Bernardo O'Higgins is conferred by the Chilean President on the advice of the Minister of Foreign Relations. The order was originally established in two classes:

- Bernardo O'Higgins Medal, I Class (Spanish: Medalla Bernardo O'Higgins, Primera Clase)
- Bernardo O'Higgins Medal, II Class (Spanish: Medalla Bernardo O'Higgins, Segunda Clase)

In 1967 the order was reorganised into five classes, and after modifications in 1985 and 2006, it acquired the same grades as the Order of Merit:

- Collar (Spanish: Collar), I* Class
- Grand Cross (Spanish: Gran Cruz), I Class
- Grand Officer (Spanish: Gran Oficial), II Class
- Commander (Spanish: Comendador), III Class
- Officer (Spanish: Oficial), IV Class
- Knight (Spanish: Caballero), V Class

=== Gabriela Mistral Order of Educational and Cultural Merit ===
The Order of Gabriela Mistral (Spanish: Orden al Mérito Docente y Cultural Gabriela Mistral) was established in 1977 and is conferred by the Minister of Education to Chileans and to foreign nationals who have 'made an outstanding contribution benefiting education, culture and the advancement of teaching'. When presented outside of Chile, installation is usually performed at the Chilean embassy, legation or consulate by the highest Chilean representative present or personally by the Minister of Education. The order consists of a single class.

=== Meritorious Service to the Republic ===
The decoration for Meritorious Service to the Republic (Spanish: Condecoración Servicios Meritorios a la República) was established as an order, in 1985, to recognise Chilean citizens for 'services of special importance for the country'. Membership of the Order is conferred by the President of the Republic upon the recommendation of a Council composed of the Ministers of the Interior, Foreign Affairs, Defence, Justice and the Secretary General of the Presidency. The council is also responsible for the order's registry. The order is established in five classes:

- Grand Star in Gold (Spanish: Gran Estrella de Oro), I Class
- Grand Officer (Spanish: Gran Oficial), II Class
- Commander (Spanish: Comendador), III Class
- Silver Star with Golden Laurel (Spanish: Comendador), IV Class
- Knight (Spanish: Caballero), V Class
- Silver Star (Spanish: Comendador), VI Class

=== Order of Naval Merit ===
The Order of Naval Merit (Spanish: Orden al Mérito Naval) was established in three classes:

- Commander (Spanish: Comendador), I Class
- Officer (Spanish: Oficial), II Class
- Knight (Spanish: Caballero), III Class

== Decorations ==
=== President of the Republic decoration ===
The decoration of the President of the Republic (Spanish: Condecoración Presidente de la República) was established as an order in four classes:

- Grand Cross´s Collar (Spanish: Collar de la Gran Cruz), I Class
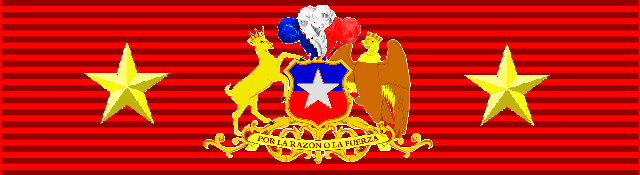
- Grand Officer (Spanish: Gran Oficial), II Class
- Officer (Spanish: Oficial), III Class
- Knight (Spanish: Caballero), IV Class

=== Decorations for gallantry ===
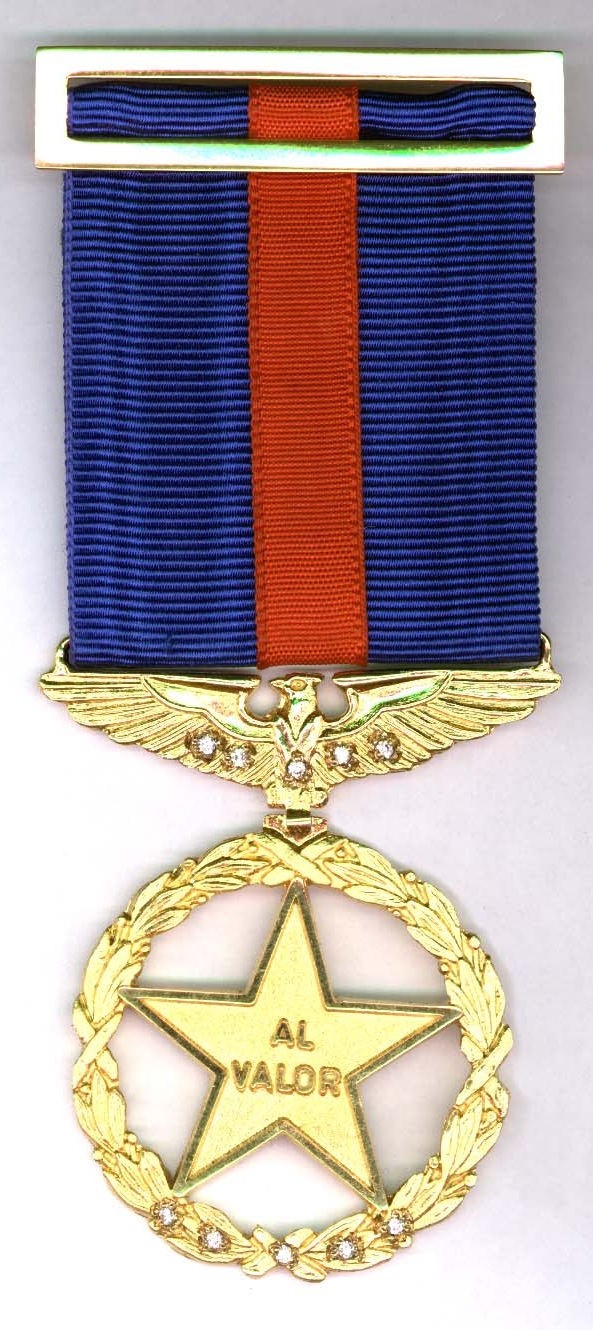
Medal of Valour I Class

Decoration of Valour (Spanish: Condecoración Al Valor)

Medal of Valour (Spanish: Medalla Al Valor)

=== Decorations for distinguished service ===
Victory Cross decoration

The Victory Cross decoration (Spanish: Condecoración Gran Cruz de la Victoria) is established in two grades:

- Grand Victory Cross (Spanish: Condecoración Gran Cruz de la Victoria)
- Victory Cross (Spanish: Condecoración Cruz de la Victoria)

Decoration of Honour for Distinguished Service (Spanish: Condecoración de Honor por Servicios Distinguidos)

- Grand Star of Honour (Army) (Spanish: Gran Estrella de Honor Ejército)
- Grand Star of Merit (Army) (Spanish: Gran Estrella al Mérito Ejército)
- Grand Star (Army) (Spanish: Gran Estrella Ejército)
- Star (Army) (Spanish: Estrella Ejército)
- Grand Star of Merit (Air Force) (Spanish: Gran Estrella al Mérito Fuerza Aérea)
- Grand Star (Air Force) (Spanish: Gran Estrella Fuerza Aérea)
- Star (Air Force) (Spanish: Estrella Fuerza Aérea)
- Grand Star of Merit (Police) (Spanish: Gran Estrella al Mérito Carabineros)
- Grand Star (Police) (Spanish: Gran Estrella Carabineros)
- Star (Police) (Spanish: Estrella Carabineros)

Distinguished Service Decoration

The Distinguished Service Decoration (Spanish: Condecoración por Servicios Distinguidos) is conferred in separate versions for each of the Army (Spanish: Ejército), Navy (Spanish: Armada), Air Force (Spanish: Fuerza Aérea) and Police Force (Spanish: Carabineros). The decoration is established in three classes:

- I Class (Spanish: Primera Clase)
- II Class (Spanish: Segunda Clase)
- III Class (Spanish: Tercera Clase)

=== Decorations for meritorious service ===
Cross of Aeronautical Merit

The Cross of Aeronautical Merit (Spanish: Condecoración Cruz al Mérito Aeronáutico) is established in five classes:

- Grand Cross of Aeronautical Merit (Spanish: Gran Cruz al Mérito Aeronáutico), I Class
- Cross of Aeronautical Merit (Spanish: Cruz al Mérito Aeronáutico), II Class
- Distinguished Flying Cross (Spanish: Cruz al Vuelo Distinguido), III Class
- Distinguished Service Cross (Spanish: Cruz de Servicios Distinguidos), IV Class
- Bar of Honour (Spanish: Barra de Honor), V Class

Cross of the Army Bicentenary The Cross of the Army Bicentenary (Spanish: Cruz del Ejército Bicentenario) was established by President of the Republic of Chile, Sebastián Piñera Echenique, in 2010 to commemorate the bicentenary of the Chilean Army (which was established on 2 December 1810). It is conferred by the Commander-in-Chief of the Army to recognise representatives of organisations that have significantly supported the endeavours of the Army. The decoration has been established in two grades:

- Grand Cross of the Army Bicentenary (Spanish: Gran Cruz del Ejército Bicentenario) - the badge of a Grand Cross is worn on a broad scarlet sash hung across the body from the right shoulder.
- Cross of the Army Bicentenary (Spanish: Cruz del Ejército Bicentenario) - this grade uses a neck badge suspended from a scarlet ribbon.

Notable recipients of the Grand Cross of the Army Bicentenary include President Piñera and the Virgin of Carmen (Spanish: la Virgen del Carmen) at the Metropolitan Cathedral of Santiago. Notable Chilean recipients of the Cross of the Army Bicentenary include the Commander-in-Chief of the Navy, Admiral Edmundo Gonzalez, the Commander-in-Chief of the Air Force, Air Force General Jorge Rojas Avila, the Director General of the Carabineros, General Manager Gustavo González Jure, and the Director General of Investigations Police, Marcos Antonio Vásquez Meza.

Medal of Diplomatic Merit

The Medal of Diplomatic Merit (Spanish: Medalla al Mérito Diplomático) was established to recognise selected officials of the foreign service branch of the Chilean Ministry of Foreign Affairs, for long and meritorious service on behalf of Chile.

Medal of Functionary Merit

The Medal of Functionary Merit (Spanish: Medalla al Mérito Funcionario) was established to recognise selected officials (functionaries) of the Management and Professional branches of the Chilean Ministry of Foreign Affairs of Chile, for long and meritorious service on behalf of Chile.

Military Works Corps Star of Honour and Merit (Spanish: Medalla Estrella de Honor al Mérito Cuerpo Militar del Trabajo)

=== Decorations for long and meritorious Service ===
Decoration for Great Military Merit of the Chilean Air Force (Spanish: Condecoración al Gran Mérito Militar de la Fuerza Aérea de Chile)

Military Star (Spanish: Condecoración Estrella Militar)

== Medals ==
=== Commemorative medals ===
Fiftieth Anniversary of the Chilean Air Force Commemorative Medal (Spanish: Condecoración Conmemorativa del Cincuentenario de la Fuerza Aérea de Chile)

=== Long service awards ===
- 30 Years Service award (Spanish: Condecoración 30 años de servicios)

- 20 Years Service award (Spanish: Condecoración 20 años de servicios)

- 10 Years Service award (Spanish: Condecoración 10 años de servicios)

- 30 Years of Police Service Medal (Spanish: Medalla 30 años de servicios Carabineros)

- 20 Years of Police Service Medal (Spanish: Medalla 20 años de servicios Carabineros)

=== Service school medals ===
- Military School of the Liberator General Bernardo O'Higgins Gold Medal (Spanish: Medalla de Oro de la Escuela Militar del Libertador General Bernardo O'Higgins)

- Minerva Medal (Army War College) (Spanish: Medalla Minerva de la Academia de Guerra Ejército)

- Minerva Medal (Air Force War College) (Spanish: Medalla Minerva de la Academia de Guerra Fuerza Aérea)

- General Carlos Ibáñez del Campo Police School Medal (Spanish: Medalla Escuela de Carabineros General Carlos Ibáñez del Campo)

- Second Sergeant Daniel Rebolledo Sepúlveda NCO School Medal (Spanish: Medalla Escuela de Suboficiales del Sargento 2° Daniel Rebolledo Sepúlveda)

Service Medal of the Ministry of National Defense (Spanish: Medalla de Servicio del Ministerio de Defensa Nacional)

=== Service medals ===
Service Medal of the Honourable Board of the Government (Spanish: Medalla por Servicios en la Honorable Junta de Gobierno)

Mission Accomplished (Spanish: Condecoración Misión Cumplida)

18 September Medal (Spanish: Medalla 18 de Septiembre)

== Obsolete ==
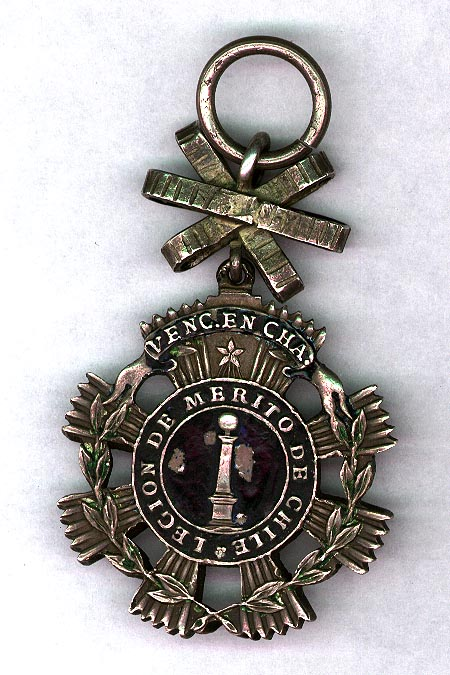
Obverse of the breast badge of the Legion of Merit of Chile, IV Class. This version of the badge was given to those who distinguished themselves in the Battle of Chacabuco, June 1817

=== Legion of Merit ===
The Legion of Merit of Chile (Spanish: Legión de Mérito de Chile) was established on 1 June 1817 by the Supreme Director of the newly independent Chile, Liberator General Bernardo O'Higgins, to reward civil and military service to the nation and, at the time, was the most senior honour of Chile. The Head of State was established as the head of the Legion. However, after O'Higgins resigned in January 1823, the President of the Regency Council, José Miguel Infante, effectively abolished the order in June 1825. The order was established in four classes:

- Grand Officers of the Legion (Spanish: Grandes Oficiales de la Legión), I Class
- Officers of the Legion (Spanish: Oficiales de la Legión), II Class
- Sub-Officers of the Legion (Spanish: Sub-Oficiales de la Legión), III Class
- Legionnaires or Members of the Legion (Spanish: Legionarios o Miembros de la Legión), IV Class
