= Carlos Barrionuevo =

Argentine footballer (1977–2015)

Personal information
- Date of birth: 29 December 1977
- Place of birth: Santa Fe, Argentina
- Date of death: 30 August 2015 (aged 37)
- Place of death: Entre Ríos, Argentina
- Height: 1.80 m (5 ft 11 in)
- Position: Forward

Senior career*
Years	Team	Apps	(Gls)
2000–2001	Estudiantes de Medicina	29	(3)
2002	Alianza Lima	32	(3)
2003	Danubio	11	(4)
2003–2004	Ferro Carril Oeste	22	(3)
2005	Gimnasia	16	(0)
2005–2006	Penafiel	15	(0)
2007	Celano Olimpia	27	(3)
2008–2009	Salernitana	11	(0)
2009–2015	CISCO Roma		
- * Club domestic league appearances and goals

Carlos Barrionuevo (29 December 1977 – 30 August 2015) was an Argentine footballer who appeared for Atlético Roma of Italy. He played as an attacking midfielder. In 2015, Barrionuevo died in a fishing accident.

== Personal life ==
Barrionuevo had a wife and three children.
