= Raúl Armando Barrionuevo =

Chilean politician

Member of Parliament, the Republic of Chile
- In office 1957–1961
- Preceded by: Héctor Montero Soto
- Succeeded by: Juan García Romero
- Constituency: Copiapó, Chañaral, Huasco and Freirina

Member of Parliament, the Republic of Chile
- In office 1965–1973
- Preceded by: Juan García Romero
- Constituency: Copiapó, Chañaral, Huasco and Freirina

Personal details
- Born: January 15, 1912 Chile, Copiapó, Chile
- Died: May 24, 1996 (aged 84) Chile, Copiapó, Chile
- Party: Christian Democratic Party of Chile
- Spouse: Olga Noemi Huerta
- Occupation: Agriculturalist, Politician

Raúl Armando Barrionuevo Barrionuevo (1913–1996) was a Chilean farmer and politician. He was born in Copiapó, January 15, 1913. He died in the same city, on May 24, 1996. He was the son of Don Luis Armando Barrionuevo Galindo and his cousin, Maria Luisa Barrionuevo Roldán. He married Naomi Olga Huerta in 1936.

== Career ==
He completed his secondary education with private tutors, giving free exams.

Professionally, he was a farmer, working on the "Piedra Colgada" farm in partnership with Alejandro Noemi Huerta, his brother-in-law, and participated in the local Agrarian Board, exploiting guano on the coast of Atacama.

He was also a merchant, serving as owner of an office for fruits of the country in Copiapó and others, as a commercial representative. He also participated in the construction of buildings for business income.

== Political career ==
He began his political activities on joining the Liberal Party, where he served as President of the Assembly in Copiapó.

In 1957 he joined the Christian Democratic Party and was elected MP for the cluster department of Copiapó, Chañaral, Huasco and Freirina for the period 1957-1961. He joined the committees of Mining and Industry, Foreign Affairs and Economy and Trade.

In 1965 he was again elected for the next period, 1965-1969. He participated in the committees on Mining and Industry, Foreign Affairs, Roads and Public Works, Public Education and Economy, Development and Reconstruction.

In addition, he belonged to the Special Commissions of Inquiry on the Steel Industry (1965), the earthquake in the Northern Zone (1967-1968) and the Special Elaborating Development Plan in the city of Iquique (1965-1966).

In 1969 he was reelected for the period 1969-1973. He was part of the Commission on Mines and Industries.

In 1973 he was reelected for the period 1973-1977. He was a member of the Mining Committee. He did not complete the entire parliamentary term as a result of the military coup and the subsequent dissolution of the National Congress in 1973.

== Other activities ==
He was a member of the Northern Agricultural Society, the National Society of Agriculture and the Copiapo Social Club. He later became chairman of the Copiapo Social Club.

He went into hiding in 1977 when the Democrats were ousted by the military regime. He then traveled to Washington DC, then to Madrid, where he settled for some years.

He returned to his country in 1988 for the reorganization of Democracy, and then became part of the presidential committee of Patricio Aylwin (1989).

He was the Regional Ministerial Secretary of Agriculture, National Advisor of the Christian Democratic Party of Chile from 1994 until his death.

In 2007, the Christian Democratic Member (now the PRI), Jaime Mulet, introduced a bill authorizing a monument erected in honor of the "Life and Work of former Congressman Raul Barrionuevo Armandio."
