= 2026 in Chile =

- Decades: 2000s; 2010s; 2020s
- See also: Other events of 2026; Timeline of Chilean history

The following is a list of events in the year 2026 in Chile.

== Incumbents ==
- President: Gabriel Boric (CS) (until 11 March); José Antonio Kast (since 11 March)
- Minister of the Interior and Public Security: Álvaro Elizalde (until 11 March); Claudio Alvarado (since 11 March)

== Events ==
=== January ===
- 18 January – A state of catastrophe is declared in Biobío and Ñuble Regions following wildfires that leave at least 18 people dead and displace over 50,000.

=== February ===
- 6–22 February – Chile at the 2026 Winter Olympics
- 10 February –
  - Telefonica announces the sale of its Chilean subsidiary to French holding company NJJ Holding and Luxembourg-based telecommunications operator Millicom for $1.2 billion.
  - Latam-GPT, the first open-source artificial intelligence language model trained on Latin American culture and developed primarily by the National Center of Artificial Intelligence of Chile (CENIA), is launched.
- 19 February – A truck carrying liquid gas explodes after crashing into a traffic barrier in Renca, Santiago Province, killing four people.
- 20 February – The United States imposes sanctions on transport minister Juan Carlos Muñoz and two other unidentified Chilean officials on charges of carrying out "activities that compromised critical telecommunications infrastructure and eroded regional security".
- 22–27 February – 65th Viña del Mar International Song Festival

=== March ===
- 11 March – José Antonio Kast is inaugurated as president of Chile for the 2026-2030 term.
- 12 March – Chilean architect Smiljan Radić Clarke receives the 2026 Pritzker Architecture Prize, recognizing his contributions to contemporary architecture.
- 17 March – President Kast suspends 43 environmental regulations.

=== June ===
- 3 June – A ENAER T-35 Pillán trainer aircraft of the Chilean Air Force crash-lands near La Serena. The two pilots on board survive.

=== July ===
- 12 July – An off-duty member of the Chilean Navy drives into an open-air market in Viña del Mar, killing six people.
- 24 July – The United States imposes a 12.5% tariff on Chile, citing the presence of alleged forced labor in the supply chain.
- 25 July – Former military officer Nelson Haase is arrested in southern Chile after avoiding a 2023 conviction and 25-year prison sentence for the 1973 murder of singer Victor Jara.

=== September ===
- 12 September – A fire at a nursing home in Pitrufquén kills 16 people.

=== November ===
- 7 November – A bus collides with a car and a truck in Valparaíso Region, killing 12 people and injuring 15 others.
- 19 November – The Philippines and Chile sign a Comprehensive Economic Partnership Agreement.

== Holidays ==
- 1 January – New Year's Day
- 3 April – Good Friday
- 4 April – Easter Saturday
- 1 May – Labour Day
- 21 May – Navy Day
- 21 June – National Day of Aboriginal Peoples
- 29 June – Feast of Saints Peter and Paul
- 16 July – Our Lady of Mount Carmel
- 15 August – Assumption Day
- 18 September – Independence Day
- 19 September – Army Day
- 12 October – Day of the Race
- 31 October – Reformation Day
- 1 November – All Saints' Day
- 8 December – Immaculate Conception
- 25 December – Christmas Day

== Deaths ==
- 8 January – Álvaro Peña-Rojas, 82, singer
- 9 January – Andrés Caniulef, 48, journalist
- 13 March – Claudio Spiniak, 77, pedophile and businessman.
- 16 March – Juan Ochagavía Larraín, 97, academic and Jesuit theologian.
- 23 March – José Bengoa, 81, historian and anthropologist.
- 29 March – Eduardo Cruz Johnson, 68, television presenter.
- 2 April – Víctor Cabrera, 68, footballer (San Luis, Everton, Regional Atacama)
- 6 June – Julio Jung, 84, actor and comedian.
- 3 July – Fernando Kliche, 71, actor.
- 10 July – Enrique Krauss, 94, deputy, minister of economy (1968–1969) and the interior (1990–1994).
- 27 July – Lucy López, 96, athlete.
- 4 September – Camilo Escalona, 71, senator (2006–2014).
- 25 September – Carmen Aldunate, 86, painter.
- 1 October: Caupolicán Peña, 96, football player (Colo-Colo, national team) and manager (Palestino).
- 11 October:
  - Juan Pablo Cárdenas Squella, 76, journalist.
  - Gabriel Prieto, 65, actor
- 6 November – Sebastián Lelio, 52, film director (Gloria, Disobedience, A Fantastic Woman), Oscar winner (2018).
