= 2023 in Chile =

- Decades: 2000s; 2010s; 2020s
- See also: Other events of 2023; Timeline of Chilean history

The following is a list of events in the year 2023 in Chile.

== Incumbents ==
- President:
  - Gabriel Boric (CS)

== Events ==
- 3 February: The government expands its state of emergency due to wildfires that began on 31 January and have burned up to 8,000 hectares. It also declares a catastrophe in the Biobío region amid a summer heat wave.
- 19–24 February: LXII Viña del Mar International Song Festival
- 29 March: Chile detects its first case of H5N1 bird flu in a 53-year-old man.
- 1 September: A collision at a level crossing in San Pedro de la Paz kills 8.
- 20 October-5 November: 2023 Pan American Games
- 27 October: Thousands of people gather in Santiago to rally in protest against Israel's military actions in Gaza.
- 6 November: Fourteen Venezuelan migrants are killed in a fire at a housing settlement in Coronel, Concepción.
- 15 December: Chile's police arrest at least 55 people in one of the country's largest fiscal fraud cases, amounting to about $275 million and implicating small- and mid-sized companies in different parts of the country. The suspects will stand trial for tax crimes, criminal association, money laundering, customs fraud and making false declarations.
- 17 December: 2023 Chilean constitutional referendum: By a margin of 56% to 44%, Chileans vote to reject the proposed new constitution drafted by the Constitutional Council.

== Deaths ==
- 1 January: Francisco Bozinovic, 63, Chilean-Croatian biologist and academic.
- 4 January: Marino Penna, 93, chemical engineer and politician, deputy (1965–1973).
- 6 January: Paula Quintana, 66, sociologist and politician.
- 16 January: Lupe Serrano, 92, Chilean-born American ballerina.
- 21 January: Stephanie Subercaseaux, 38, racing cyclist.
- 11 February: Tito Fernández, 80, singer-songwriter.
- 16 February: Aníbal Palma, 87, politician and diplomat, minister general secretariat of government (1973), minister of education (1972) and housing and urbanism (1973).
- 22 February: Tatiana Lobo, 83, Chilean-born Costa Rican writer.
- 25 February: Sixtus Josef Parzinger, 91, Austrian-Chilean Roman Catholic prelate, bishop of Villarrica (2001–2009).
- 17 March: Jorge Edwards, 91, novelist and diplomat, ambassador to France (2010–2014).
- 20 March: Eduardo Ravani, 81, comedian.
- 26 March: Claudia Schüler, 35, field hockey player (national team).
- 6 May: Néstor Matamala, 82, football manager (Motagua, Real España, Olimpia).
- 22 May: Erick Pohlhammer, 68, poet.
- 1 June: Pedro Messone, 88, singer, composer and actor.
- 11 July: David Rosenmann-Taub, 96, poet, musician and artist.
- 20 July: José Sulantay, 83, football player (Deportes La Serena) and manager (Coquimbo Unido, Deportes La Serena).
- 21 July: Malú Urriola, 56, poet.
- 24 July: Cecilia Pantoja, 79, singer-songwriter.
- 4 August: Luis Alarcón, 93, actor (Jackal of Nahueltoro, Julio comienza en julio, Three Sad Tigers).
- 17 August: Hugo Álamos Vásquez, 90, agronomic engineer and politician, deputy (1969–1973, 1990–1994).
- 24 August: Belisario Velasco, 87, politician, minister of the interior (2006–2008).
- 29 August:
  - Hernán Chacón Soto, 86, military officer, convicted kidnapper and murderer of Víctor Jara.
  - Guillermo Teillier, 79, Chilean politician, deputy (2010–2022)
- 10 September: Hernán Carrasco, 100, football manager (Águila, Colo-Colo, El Salvador national team).
- 18 September: Grimanesa Jiménez, 86, actress (La Colorina, Papi Ricky).
- 1 October: Roberto Thieme, 80, political activist.
- 5 October:Jacques Chonchol, 97, politician, minister of agriculture (1970–1972).
- 18 October: Alberto Jerez Horta, 96, lawyer, visual artist and politician, senator (1969–1973) and deputy (1961–1969).
- 22 October: Enrique Maluenda, 88, television host.
- 28 October:Juan Álvarez, 80, footballer (San Luis, Santiago Wanderers, Deportes La Serena).
- 12 November: Joan Jara, 96, British-Chilean dancer and human rights activist.
- 16 November: Fernando Jara, 93, footballer (Universidad Católica, 1952 Olympics).
- 17 November: Luis Larraín, 42, LGBT rights activist.
- 25 November: Julio Anderson, 74, bass guitarist (Los Jaivas).
- 26 November: Rodolfo Stange, 98, police officer and politician, senator (1998–2005) and member of the government junta (1985–1990).
- 29 November: Luis Bates, 89, lawyer and politician, minister of justice (2003–2006).
- 7 December: Pedro Velásquez, 59, politician, lawyer and convicted fraudster, deputy (2010–2014, 2018–2022) and mayor of Coquimbo (1992–2006).
- 17 December: John Biehl, 84, lawyer, political scientist, and diplomat, minister secretary-general of the Presidency (1998–1999).
- 21 December: Carmen Barros, 98, actress (La Fiebre del Loco, The Guest), singer and theatre director.
