= 2027 in Chile =

- Decades: 2000s; 2010s; 2020s
- See also: Other events of 2027; Timeline of Chilean history

The following is a list of events in the year 2027 in Chile.

== Events ==
=== Predicted and scheduled ===
- 6 February – Solar eclipse of February 6, 2027 (total eclipse)
- 15–23 October – 2027 Special Olympics World Summer Games

== Holidays ==
- 1 January – New Year's Day
- 26 March – Good Friday
- 27 March – Easter Saturday
- 1 May – Labour Day
- 21 May – Navy Day
- 21 June – National Day of Aboriginal Peoples
- 28 June – Feast of Saints Peter and Paul
- 16 July – Our Lady of Mount Carmel
- 15 August – Assumption Day
- 18 September – Independence Day
- 19 September – Army Day
- 11 October – Day of the Race
- 31 October – Reformation Day
- 1 November – All Saints' Day
- 8 December – Immaculate Conception
- 25 December – Christmas Day
- 31 December – New Year's Eve

== Art and entertainment ==
- 2027 in Chilean music
- List of Chilean films of 2027
- 2027 in Chilean television
