= 2024 in Chile =

- Decades: 2000s; 2010s; 2020s
- See also: Other events of 2024; Timeline of Chilean history

The following is a list of events in the year 2024 in Chile.

== Incumbents ==
- President: Gabriel Boric (CS)
- Minister of the Interior and Public Security: Carolina Tohá

== Events ==
=== February ===
- 1-5 February: 2024 Chile wildfire season – Chile declares a state of emergency as wildfires kill at least 131 people across the country. Multiple fires are reported in Valparaíso and Viña del Mar.
- 6 February: Death and state funeral of Sebastián Piñera - Former two-time president Sebastián Piñera dies in a helicopter crash near the town of Lago Ranco.
- 21 February: Venezuelan military refugee Ronald Ojeda is kidnapped and later found dead in Maipú.

=== March ===
- 9 March: The 2024 Chilean census begins.
- 15–17 March – Lollapalooza Chile 2024 at Parque Cerrillos, Santiago.

=== April ===
- 27 April: Three Carabineros are killed in an ambush in Biobío Region.

=== May ===
- 25 May: 2024 Chile wildfires – A firefighter and a CONAF official are arrested on suspicion of arson in a fire that killed 137 people in Viña del Mar.

=== June ===
- 13 June: One person is killed during heavy rains and storms across central and southern Chile. In connection to the rainfall the mines of Grupo Minero Las Cenizas in the Cabildo district suffered a tailings-mush spill impacting the waters of Ligua River and in the ravine of Quebrada Chincorro.
- 20 June: A freight train collides with another train conducting a test run in San Bernardo, killing two people and injuring nine others.

=== July ===
- 18 July: A magnitude 7.4 earthquake strikes 45 km east-south-east of San Pedro de Atacama, killing one person in Calama.
- 31 July: The 2024 Chilean census ends.

=== August ===
- 13-16 August: Workers at the Escondida copper mine go on strike following a breakdown in negotiations with its majority owner BHP over pay.

=== October ===
- 2 October: A total solar eclipse occurs over Easter Island and the Chilean Patagonia.
- 23 October: A molotov cocktail explodes inside a high school in Santiago, injuring 34 students and one teacher.

=== November ===
- 8 November: Julia Chuñil goes missing.
- 14 November: Former deputy interior minister Manuel Monsalve is arrested on suspicion of raping a female ministry employee at a hotel.

=== Scheduled ===
- 27 October:
  - 2024 Chilean municipal elections
  - 2024 Chilean regional elections

== Art and entertainment ==
- List of Chilean submissions for the Academy Award for Best International Feature Film

== Holidays ==
- 1 January – New Year's Day
- 29 March – Good Friday
- 30 March – Easter Saturday
- 1 May – Labour Day
- 21 May – Navy Day
- 21 June – National Day of Aboriginal Peoples
- 29 June – Feast of Saints Peter and Paul
- 16 July – Our Lady of Mount Carmel
- 15 August – Assumption Day
- 18 September – Independence Day
- 19 September – Army Day
- 14 October – Day of the Race
- 31 October – Reformation Day
- 1 November – All Saints' Day
- 8 December – Immaculate Conception
- 25 December – Christmas Day

== Deaths ==
- 6 January – Ricardo Gálvez, 90, lawyer, judge and academic, justice of the Supreme Court (1998–2008).
- 6 February - Sebastian Piñera, 74, politician, president and ex-president of Chile (2010 - 2014, 2018 - 2022).
- 15 October - Antonio Skármeta, 83, writer, scriptwriter and director.
