= 2020 in Chile =

- Decades: 2000s; 2010s; 2020s
- See also: Other events of 2020; Timeline of Chilean history

Events of 2020 in Chile.

== Incumbents ==
- President: Sebastián Piñera (RN)

== Events ==
=== January ===
- January 1 – Eye injury in the 2019–2020 Chilean protests: in two separate incidents two men were permanently blinded in one of their eyes as result of being hit by tear gas grenades shot by Chilean riot police.

=== March ===
- March 21 – Ministry of Health reports its country's first COVID-19 death in an 83-year woman from Renca Santiago.
- March 24 – Easter Island records its first case of COVID-19.
- Late March: first puma sightings of 2020 in Santiago

=== April ===
- April 21 – Protests against the Chilean government in commemoration of the International Workers' Day are suppressed by the police, citing social distancing laws established due to the coronavirus pandemic.
- April 28 – Bolivia and Chile agree on a deal to return home hundreds of Bolivian migrants stranded at a makeshift camp in Santiago. The migrants were transported to Iquique where they spent 14 days in quarantine before finally returning to Bolivia.

=== May ===
- May 18 – Protests against the government resume in Santiago due to food shortages in the poorest neighborhoods of the city created by the lockdown to control the COVID-19 pandemic.

=== June ===
- June 13
  - More than 3,100 deaths are officially reported in the country. However, an investigation reported the Ministry of Health told the World Health Organization that the death toll reached 5,000 cases.
  - Enrique Paris replaces Jaime Mañalich as Minister for Health.

=== October ===
- October 26 – Chilean citizens voted in a referendum to rewrite its constitution, with 78% of the nearly 7.5 million citizens who participated voting in favor of creating a new constitution.

== Deaths ==
- January 3 – Mónica Echeverría, journalist, writer and actress (b. 1920)
- February 10 – Rubén Selman, football referee, heart attack (b. 1963)
- February 15 – José Zalaquett, lawyer and human rights advocate (b. 1942)
- March 5 – Alejandro Sieveking, playwright and theatre director (b. 1934)
- April 2 – Claudio Spies, composer (b.1925)
- April 16 – Luis Sepúlveda, writer and journalist (b. 1949)
- May 6 – Antonio Piraíno, Olympic equestrian (1968) (b. 1928)
- June 21 – Bernardino Piñera, Roman Catholic bishop (d. 2020)
- July 2 – Ángela Jeria, archaeologist and human rights activist (b.1926)
- August 12 – Sybil Brintrup, conceptual artist (b. 1954)
- September 6 – Marco Cariola, cattle farmer, lawyer and politician, senator (1998–2006) (b. 1932)
- October 23 – Gabriel Guarda, architect and historian (b.1928)

== See also ==
- 2019 Chilean protests
- 2020 Chilean national plebiscite
- 2020 Summer Olympics
- 2020 Summer Paralympics
