= 2021 in Chile =

- Decades: 2000s; 2010s; 2020s
- See also: Other events of 2021; Timeline of Chilean history

Events in the year 2021 in Chile.

== Incumbents ==
- President: Sebastián Piñera (RN)

== Events ==
Ongoing — COVID-19 pandemic in Chile

=== January to March ===
- 4 January - The University Transition Test that replaced the PSU is carried out, with fewer questions and with a strict health protocol due to the pandemic.
- 7 January – Former GOPE sergeant Carlos Alarcón is found guilty of the murder of Camilo Catrillanca. A few days later he is sentenced to 16 years in prison.
- 30 January – A fire at San Borja Arriarán hospital in Santiago required 20 companies of firefighters to control, but the patients were all safely evacuated to nearby hospitals.
- 5 February – Hundreds protest and municipal buildings are set on fire in Panguipulli after police kill a street performer.
- 10 February – The government announces it will deport 2,000 undocumented immigrants, mostly from Venezuela. The town of Colchane, Tamarugal Province, has expanded from a population of 300 to 1,700 since 1 February.
- 11 February – Mónica Zalaquett, Minister of Women and Gender Equity, condemns comments by councilor Iván Roca (Independent Democratic Union) of Lota, Biobío Region, excusing his 33-year-old son′s rape of a 12-year-old girl because the girl had ″the body of a woman″.
- 15 February – COVID-19: 779,541 total cases since the outbreak of the pandemic, 19,624 deaths, 2,147,272 doses of vaccine administered
- 4 March – Tsunami alert following earthquakes near the Kermadec Islands, New Zealand

=== Scheduled events ===
- 10-11 April – Scheduled date for the 2021 Chilean Constitutional Convention election. President Piñera proposed holding the election in May to allow greater vaccination.
- 21 November – Scheduled date for the 2021 Chilean general election, to elect the President and National Congress. In the 2021 elections 27 members of the Senate (out of a total of maximum 50) will be elected, replacing 20 outgoing senators.

== Deaths ==
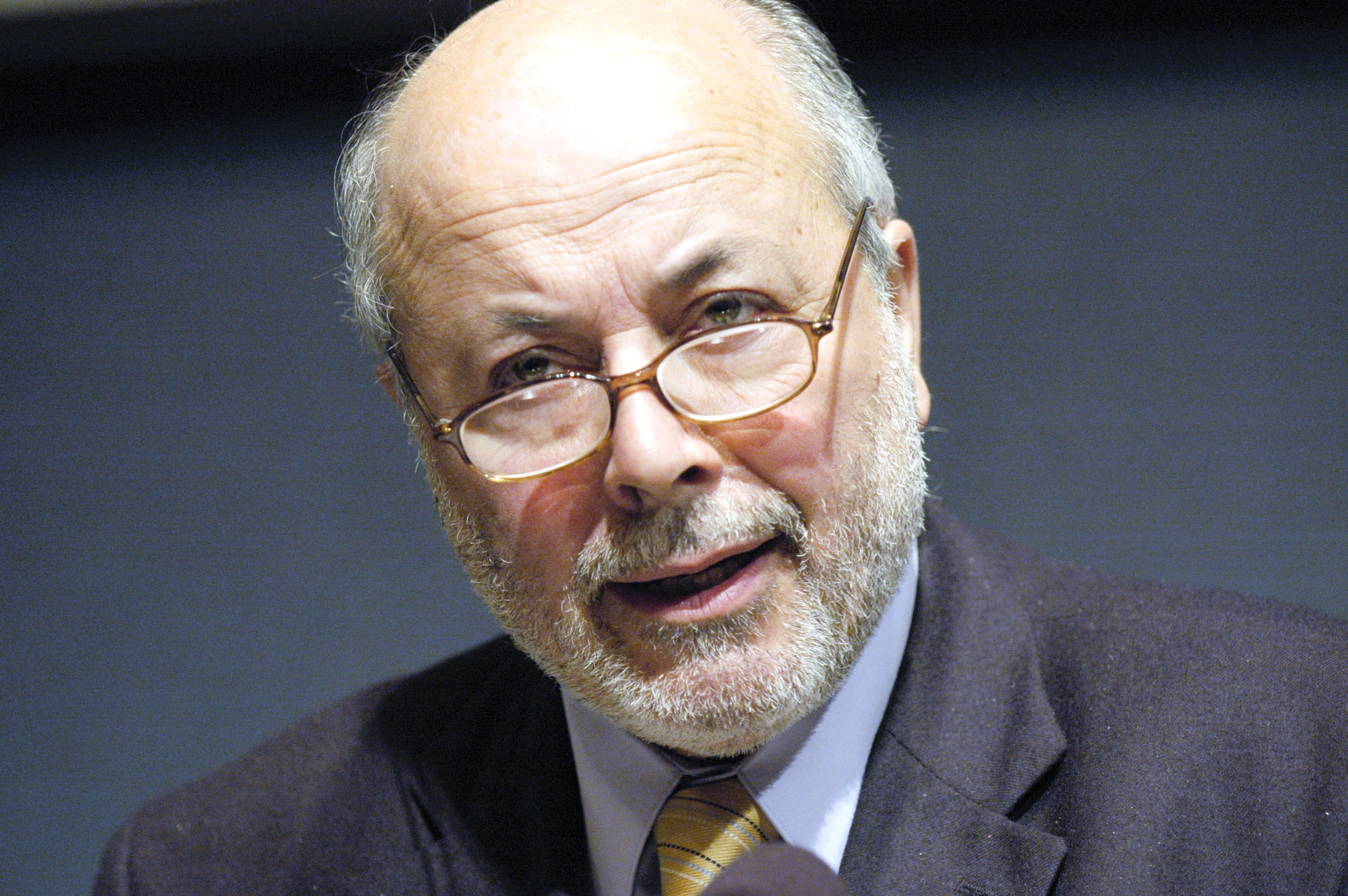
Juan Guzmán Tapia

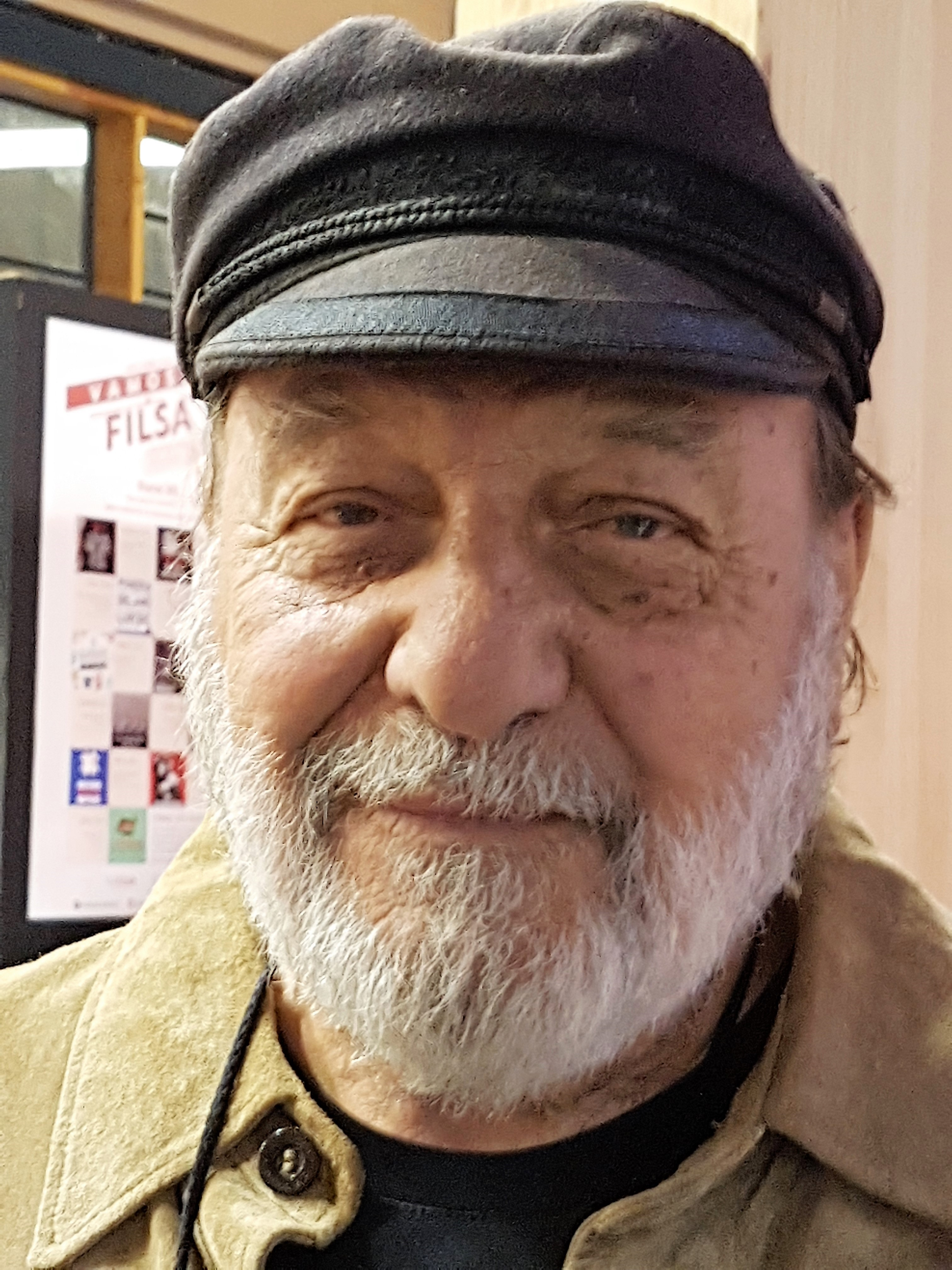
Patricio Manns

- 3 January – Manola Robles, journalist (b. 1948).
- 20 January - Mario Gutiérrez, musician, member of Los Ángeles Negros (b. 1949)
- 22 January - Juan Guzmán Tapia, judge (Augusto Pinochet's arrest and trial), (b. 1939).
- 27 January – Ignacio Tejeda, 17, tennis player; cancer.
- 31 January - Oliver Welden, award-winning poet (born 1946)
- 7 February – Mario Osbén, 69, footballer (Colo-Colo, Cobreloa, national team); heart attack.
- 10 March – Tomás Vidiella, 83, film director and actor; COVID-19.
- 13 March – Uruguay Graffigna, 73, Uruguayan-Chilean footballer (San Luis de Quillota, Los Angeles Aztecs, PEC Zwolle); complications from COVID-19 and Alzheimer's disease.
- 19 March – Cristián Cuturrufo, 48, jazz trumpeter; COVID-19.
- 27 March – Eugenio Mimica Barassi, 71, writer (born 1949).
- 8 April – Elsa Bolívar, 91, painter.
- 14 April – Tati Penna, 61, singer, journalist and television personality; cancer.
- 22 April – Armando Jofré, 44, artist and puppet maker (31 Minutos); COVID-19.
- 6 May – Humberto Maturana, 92, philosopher and biologist (born 1928).
- 6 July – Luisa Toledo, human rights activist and mother of the Vergara Toledo brothers (born 1939)
- 25 July – Fernando Karadima, 90, catholic priest accused of sexual abuse (born 1930).
- 25 September – Patricio Manns, 84, singer (born 1973)
- 3 October – Jorge Medina, 94, cardinal (born 1926).
- 5 October – Reinaldo Solari, 96, businessman (born 1925).

== See also ==
- Pacific Alliance
- COVID-19 in South America
