= List of hospitals in Chile =

This is a list of hospitals in Chile. There are 425 hospitals in Chile. 54% of hospitals are private and the remaining 46% are public. Where there is not an article in the English Wikipedia, but it in the Spanish Wikipedia, the Spanish Wikipedia article link has been included as a parenthetical clickable link, (es).

== Santiago Metropolitan Region ==
- Hospital del Tórax, Providencia
- Hospital Luis Calvo Mackenna, Santiago
- Hospital Roberto del Río, Independencia
- Hospital del Salvador, Providencia
- Hospital Sótero del Río, Puente Alto
- Hospital Psiquiátrico Dr. Horvitz Barak
- San Juan de Dios Hospital
- Hospital Luis Tisné, Santiago
- Hospital Militar, La Reina
- Hospital Dipreca
- Hospital Félix Bulnes, Quinta Normal
- Hospital Paula Jaraquemada
- Hospital Metropolitano de Santiago, Providencia
- Hospital Barros Luco, San Miguel
- Hospital Trudeau
- Hospital Exequiel González Cortez, San Miguel
- Hospital de Enfermedades Infecciosas

== Valparaíso Region ==
- Admiral Nef Naval Hospital, Viña del Mar
- Carlos Van Buren Hospital, Valparaíso
- Gustavo Fricke Hospital, Viña del Mar

== Other regions ==
- Hospital Regional Guillermo Grant Benavente, Concepción
- Naval Hospital of Puerto Williams, Puerto Williams
- Juan Noe Clinical Hospital Arica
- Pichilemu Hospital
- Ernesto Torres Galdámes Hospital Iquique
- Hospital Clínico Regional de Antofagasta Dr. Leonardo Guzmán Antofagasta
- Hospital Clínico Regional Valdivia; Valdivia
- Hospital Intercultural Comunitario de Lonquimay, Lonquimay
