= Galaz (surname) =

Galaz is a surname. Notable people with the surname include:

- Alicia Galaz Vivar (1936–2003), Chilean poet and literary researcher
- Patricio Galaz (born 1976), Chilean footballer
- Roberto Contreras Galaz (1912–1981), Chilean lawyer and politician
- Su Helen Galaz (born 1991), Chilean footballer
