= Brintrup =

Brintrup is a surname. Notable people with the surname include:

- Georg Brintrup (born 1950), German film director, screenwriter, and producer
- Sybil Brintrup (1954–2020), Chilean conceptual artist
