= 2019 in Chile =

- Decades: 1990s; 2000s; 2010s; 2020s
- See also: Other events of 2019; Timeline of Chilean history

The following is a list of events in the year 2019 in Chile.

== Incumbents ==
- President: Sebastián Piñera (RN)

== Events ==
- January 19 – A magnitude 6.7 earthquake hits Tongoy, Coquimbo Region in Chile, causing two deaths and as many as 200,000 people left without power. Despite its moderate magnitude, since it was an intraplate earthquake, it caused some serious damage in La Serena and nearby cities.
- October 7 – 2019–2022 Chilean protests: The protest begin due to cost of living and inequality.
- October 19 – 2019–2022 Chilean protests: A curfew was declared in the Greater Santiago area.
- October 21 – Eye injuries in the 2019–2020 Chilean protests: a record of twenty patients with eye injury arrive at Hospital del Salvador, of these ten arrive in a single hour.
- October 25 - Over 1 million people demonstrated in Santiago in what was described as the largest protest in Chile's history.

== Deaths ==
- August 8 – Manfred Max-Neef, economist (b. 1932)

== See also ==
- 2019 Pan American Games
- 2019–2022 Chilean protests
