= Pamela Pereira =

Chilean lawyer

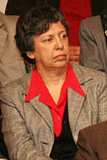
- Born: Pamela Pereira Fernández
- Occupation: Lawyer

Pamela Pereira Fernández is a Chilean lawyer, noted for having defended, in numerous cases, victims of human rights violations committed during the military regime of Augusto Pinochet (1973–1990).

== Education ==
Pereira studied Law at the University of Chile and has been a professor of legal clinics at the Faculty of Law of the same university (since 1994), and of criminal law at the Andrés Bello University. She formed the Roundtable on Human Rights between 1999 and 2000. She is currently a member of the Court Unit of the Public Criminal Defense Service of Chile.

In January 2010 she was appointed by the Senate to the Board of Directors of the National Institute of Human Rights of Chile.

She is a member of the Socialist Party of Chile.

== Career ==
Pereira has served as Professor of Legal Clinics at the Faculty of Law (since 1994), and of Criminal Law at the Andrés Bello University.
