= Chile 2015 =

Chile 2015 may refer to:

- 2015 Copa América, an Association football event
- 2015 FIFA U-17 World Cup, an Association football event
- 2015 in Chile, listing events of 2015
