= 2022 in Chile =

- Decades: 2000s; 2010s; 2020s
- See also: Other events of 2022; Timeline of Chilean history

The following is a list of events in the year 2022 in Chile.

== Incumbents ==
- President:
  - Sebastián Piñera (RN, until 11 March)
  - Gabriel Boric (CS, from 11 March)

== Events ==
Ongoing — COVID-19 pandemic in Chile

=== January ===
- 1–15 January - 2022 Hunga Tonga–Hunga Ha'apai eruption and tsunami

=== February ===
- 1 February - Chile beats Bolivia 3–2 at a football match in La Paz, eliminating the latter from participating in the final tournament of the FIFA World Cup.

=== March ===
- 2 March – Chile voted on a United Nations resolution condemning Russia for its invasion of Ukraine.

=== September ===
- 4 September – A proposed new constitution is rejected by 61% of voters.

== Sport ==
=== Football ===
- 2022 Chilean Primera División
- 2022 Primera B de Chile
- 2022 Copa Chile

=== Other sports ===
- 8 May: Santiago Marathon
- Chile at the 2022 Winter Olympics
- Chile at the 2022 Winter Paralympics

== Deaths ==
=== January ===
- 7 January – Luis Pareto González, 93, politician (b. 1928)
- 13 January – Arturo Frei Bolívar, 82, politician (b. 1939)
- 21 January – Leonor Oyarzún, 102, family therapist, first lady (1990–1994) (b. 1919)

=== February ===
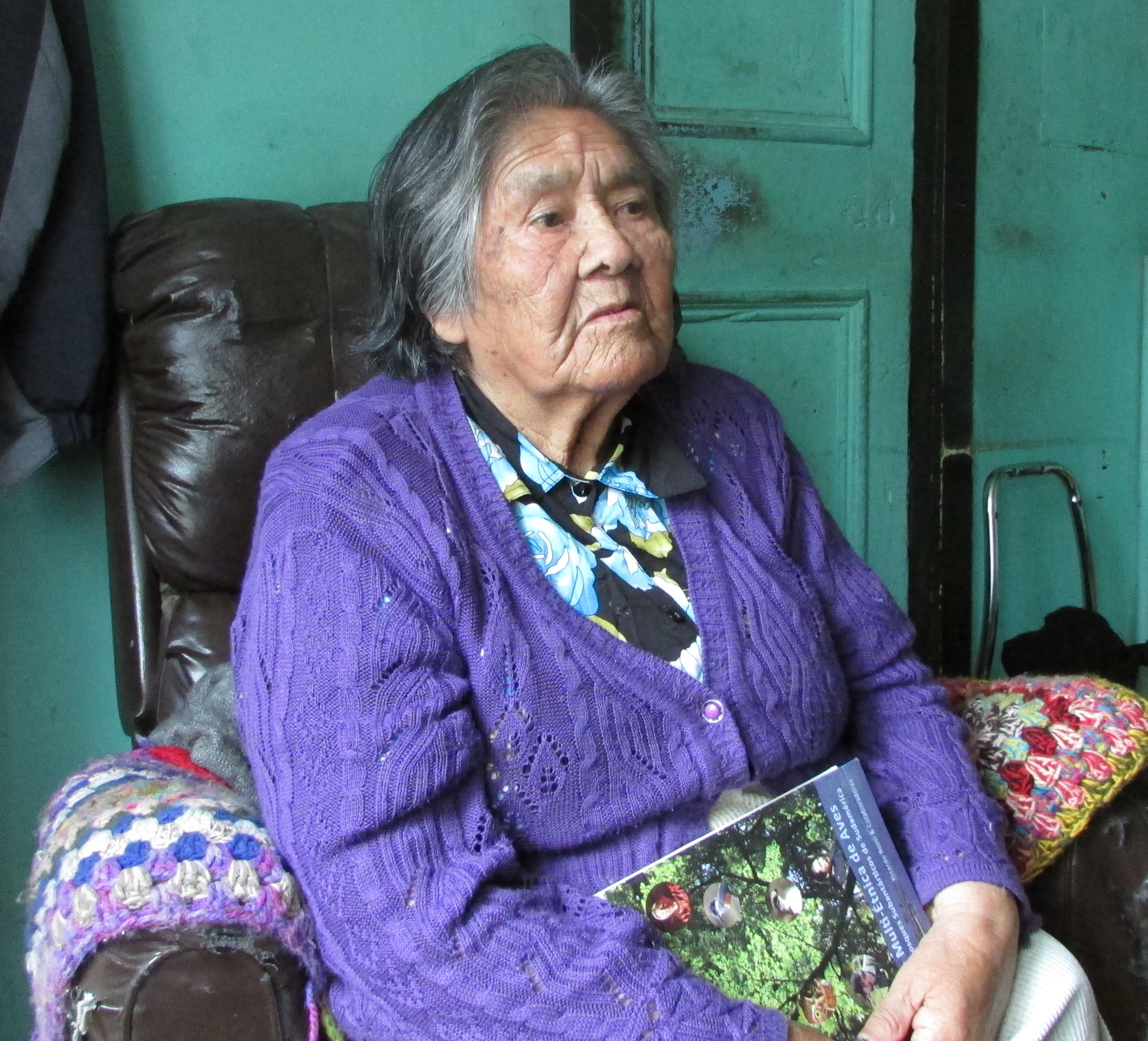
Cristina Calderón

- 4 February – Sergio Bravo, 72, screenwriter (b. 1949)
- 10 February – Mane Nett, 73, actress and cultural manager (b. 1948)
- 12 February – Tomás Osvaldo González Morales, 76, Roman Catholic bishop (b. 1935)
- 16 February – Cristina Calderón, 93, Yaghan singer, ethnographer, and writer (b. 1928)

=== March ===
- 5 March – Patricio Renán, 77, singer (b. 1945)
- 7 March
  - Héctor Vargas Bastidas, 70, Chilean Roman Catholic prelate (b. 1951)
  - Benjamín Prado Casas, 96, politician (b. 1926)
- 20 March – Adriana Hoffmann, 82, botanist, environmentalist and author (b. 1940)
- 31 March – Patricia Poblete, 75, economist, Minister of Housing and Urbanism (2006–2010) (b. 1946)

=== April ===
- 2 April – Leonel Sánchez, 85, footballer (Universidad de Chile, Colo-Colo, national team) and manager (b. 1936)
- 17 April – Mireya Baltra, 90, journalist and politician, deputy (1969–1973) and minister of labor (1972).
