= 2015 in Chile =

- Decades: 1990s; 2000s; 2010s; 2020s
- See also: Other events of 2015; Timeline of Chilean history

The following lists events that happened during 2015 in Chile.

== Incumbents ==
- President: Michelle Bachelet (Socialist)

== Events ==
=== March ===
- March 3 – The Villarrica volcano erupted in southern Chile leading to the evacuation of 3,000 people.
- March 24-25 – in the 2015 Chilean storm, an unusual cold core prompts excessive rainfall and flooding in Atacama

=== April ===
- April 22 – The Calbuco volcano erupted.

=== June ===
- June 11 – In football, the 44th Copa América took place across Chile.

=== September ===
- September 16 – Magnitude 8.3 earthquake strikes 54km W of Illapel.

== Deaths ==
- May 8 – Juan Schwanner, Hungarian-Chilean footballer and manager (b. 1921)
- July 4 – Carlo de Gavardo, motorcycle racer (b. 1969)
