= 2025 in Chile =

- Decades: 2000s; 2010s; 2020s
- See also: Other events of 2025; Timeline of Chilean history

The following is a list of events in the year 2025 in Chile.

== Incumbents ==
- President: Gabriel Boric (CS)
- Minister of the Interior and Public Security: Carolina Tohá (until 4 March); Álvaro Elizalde (since 4 March)

== Events ==
=== January ===
- 3 January – Chile's President Gabriel Boric visits the Amundsen-Scott South Pole Station, becoming the first leader in the Americas to visit the South Pole.

=== February ===
- 8 February – A state of emergency is declared in Ñuble and Maule Regions due to wildfires.
- 25 February – A state of emergency and a curfew is declared following a nationwide blackout that affects an area ranging from the Arica y Parinacota Region to the Los Lagos Region.

=== March ===
- 7 March – A magnitude 6.1 earthquake hits near San Pedro de Atacama.
- 23 March – Wildfires break out in Biobio, Araucania, Ñuble and Los Rios Regions, displacing 100 people.
- 26 March – At least 16 people are injured in nationwide protests over proposals in the National Congress of Chile to promote artisanal fishing rights.

=== April ===
- 10 April – Two people are killed in clashes between police and football fans trying to enter the Estadio Monumental David Arellano in Santiago to watch a Copa Libertadores match between Colo-Colo and Fortaleza.

=== May ===
- 2 May – A magnitude 7.4 earthquake hits the Drake Passage off the coast of Magallanes Region, prompting tsunami warnings and evacuations in the region as well as in the Chilean Antarctic Territory and parts of southern Argentina.

=== June ===
- 6 June – A magnitude 6.2 earthquake hits the Atacama Region, injuring two people.
- 28 June – 6 July – 2025 FIBA Women's AmeriCup

=== July ===
- 21 July – President Boric hosts a summit of leftwing leaders from South America and Spain in Santiago.
- 30 July – A magnitude 8.8 earthquake with an epicenter off the coast of Kamchatka in Russia triggers tsunami waves that reach a height of up to 2.5 m (8 ft 2 in) in parts of Chile.
- 31 July – A magnitude 5.0 earthquake hits O'Higgins Region, killing six miners in a collapse at the El Teniente mine.

=== September ===
- 3 September – FIFA issues a CHF115,000 ($143,000)-fine on the Football Federation of Chile over racist behavior by fans during a 2026 FIFA World Cup qualification match between the national team and Argentina in June.
- 6 September – Ethan Guo, a US national who had been detained since 28 June for making an unauthorized flight over the Chilean Antarctic Territory, is released from the Base Presidente Eduardo Frei Montalva.
- 7 September – 19 October – 2025 FIFA U-20 World Cup
- 15 September – Italian skier Matteo Franzoso dies in a hospital in Santiago from injuries sustained after colliding with a fence during training in La Parva on 13 September.
- 23 September – President Boric nominates former president Michelle Bachelet to become the next Secretary-General of the United Nations upon the end of António Guterres' tenure in 2026.

=== October ===
- 16 October – A Sikorsky UH-60 Black Hawk helicopter of the Chilean Air Force crashes in Aysén Region, killing one of four crew members on board.

=== November ===
- 16 November – 2025 Chilean general election (first round): No candidate wins a majority in the presidential election, with left-wing candidate Jeannette Jara and far right lawyer José Antonio Kast entering into a runoff.
- 17 November – Five foreign tourists are killed in a snowstorm at the Torres del Paine National Park.

=== December ===
- 14 December – 2025 Chilean general election (second round): Republican Party candidate José Antonio Kast is elected president with 58% of the vote.
- 27 December – Lithium mining: State-owned mining company Codelco and private company SQM create a joint venture to develop lithium in the Atacama salt flat until 2026 with the government set to receive the majority of operating margins.

== Art and entertainment ==
- List of Chilean submissions for the Academy Award for Best International Feature Film

== Holidays ==
- 1 January – New Year's Day
- 18 April – Good Friday
- 19 April – Easter Saturday
- 1 May – Labour Day
- 21 May – Navy Day
- 20 June – National Day of Aboriginal Peoples
- 29 June – Feast of Saints Peter and Paul
- 16 July – Our Lady of Mount Carmel
- 15 August – Assumption Day
- 18 September – Independence Day
- 19 September – Army Day
- 13 October – Day of the Race
- 31 October – Reformation Day
- 1 November – All Saints' Day
- 8 December – Immaculate Conception
- 25 December – Christmas Day

== Deaths ==
- July 18 – María Gracia Varas, 23, athlete.
- December 9 – Pablo Rodríguez Grez, 87, politician and lawyer, founder of Fatherland and Liberty.
- December 26 – Miguel Caviedes, 95, Roman Catholic prelate, bishop of Osorno (1982–1994) and of Los Ángeles (1994–2006).
