= 2018 in Chile =

- Decades: 1990s; 2000s; 2010s; 2020s
- See also: Other events of 2018; Timeline of Chilean history

== Incumbents ==
- President: Michelle Bachelet (Socialist) (left office on March 11), Sebastián Piñera (RN) (took office on March 11)

== Events ==
- January 15–18: Pope Francisco's visit to Chile.
- February 3: Santiago EPrix is a race in the forest Park circuit in the 2017–18 season of the formula E.
- March 11: Change of Presidential command, Michelle Bachelet delivered the presidency of the country to Sebastián Piñera for the period between March 11, 2018 and March 11, 2022.

== Music ==
=== Concerts ===
- January 14: Placido Domingo (Chile in My Heart)
- February 21: Queens of the Stone Age
- May 25: Harry Styles
- July 4: Niall Horan

== Deaths ==
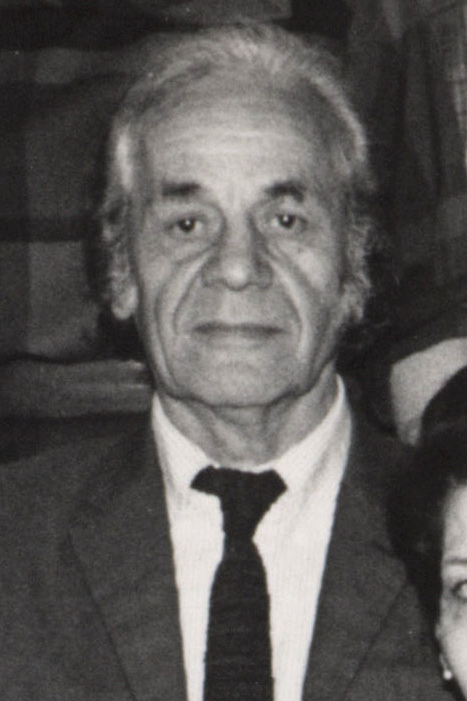
Nicanor Parra

- January 1: Manuel Rojas del Rio, lawyer and politician
- January 12: Roberto Avendaño, actor
- January 23:
  - Nicanor Parra, writer, mathematician and physicist
  - Marcelo Romo, actor
- April 16: Alejandro Rojas Wainer, academic
- July 18: Carlos Aldunate Lyon, Jesuit priest
