= 2017 in Chile =

- Decades: 1990s; 2000s; 2010s; 2020s
- See also: Other events of 2017; Timeline of Chilean history

Events in the year 2017 in Chile.

== Incumbents ==
- President: Michelle Bachelet

== Events ==
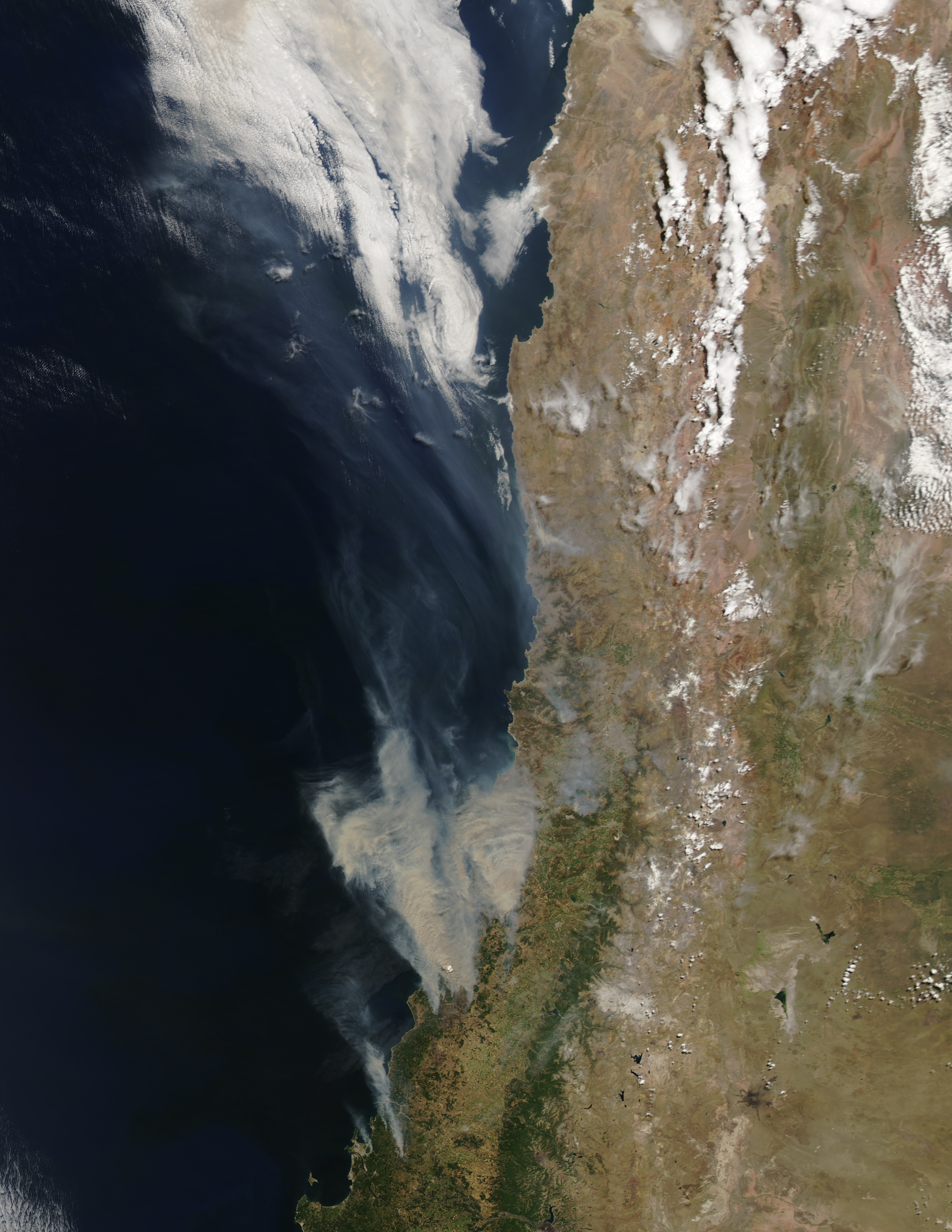
Satellite image of the 2017 Chile wildfires, on 25 January

- January – The 2017 Chile wildfires kill several people and destroy more than 1,000 buildings, including the town of Santa Olga.
- November – First round of Chilean general election, 2017
- December – Final round

of Chilean general election, 2017

== Deaths ==
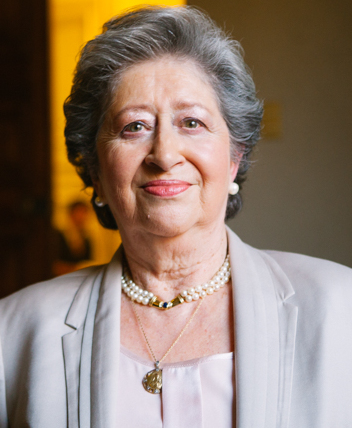
Olga Feliú in 2015

- 24 January – Carlos Verdejo, footballer (b. 1934).
- 25 June – Olga Feliú, politician and lawyer (b. 1932)
