= Andrés Caniulef =

Chilean journalist (1977–2026)

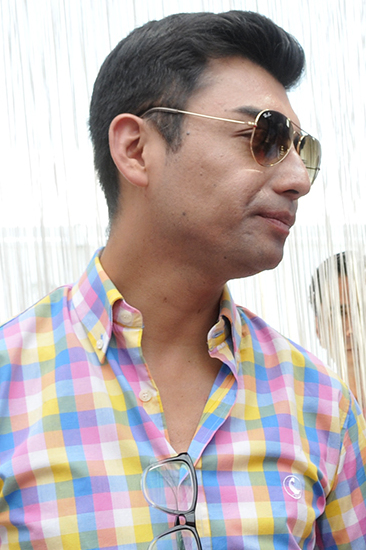
- Caniulef in 2014
- Born: Eladio Andrés Caniulef Urrea; 24 June 1977; Santiago, Chile
- Died: 9 January 2026 (aged 48); Santiago, Chile
- Occupation: Journalist

Eladio Andrés Caniulef Urrea (24 June 1977 – 9 January 2026) was a Chilean entertainment journalist.

== Early life and education ==
Caniulef was born in Santiago on 24 June 1977, the son of Eladio Caniulef, a Chilean Air Force officer of Mapuche origin, and María Urrea. Due to his father's work, he lived in Punta Arenas and Temuco during his childhood, returning to Santiago during his adolescence to settle with his family in San Bernardo. He pursued higher education in journalism at Andrés Bello National University, where he earned his degree.

== Television career ==
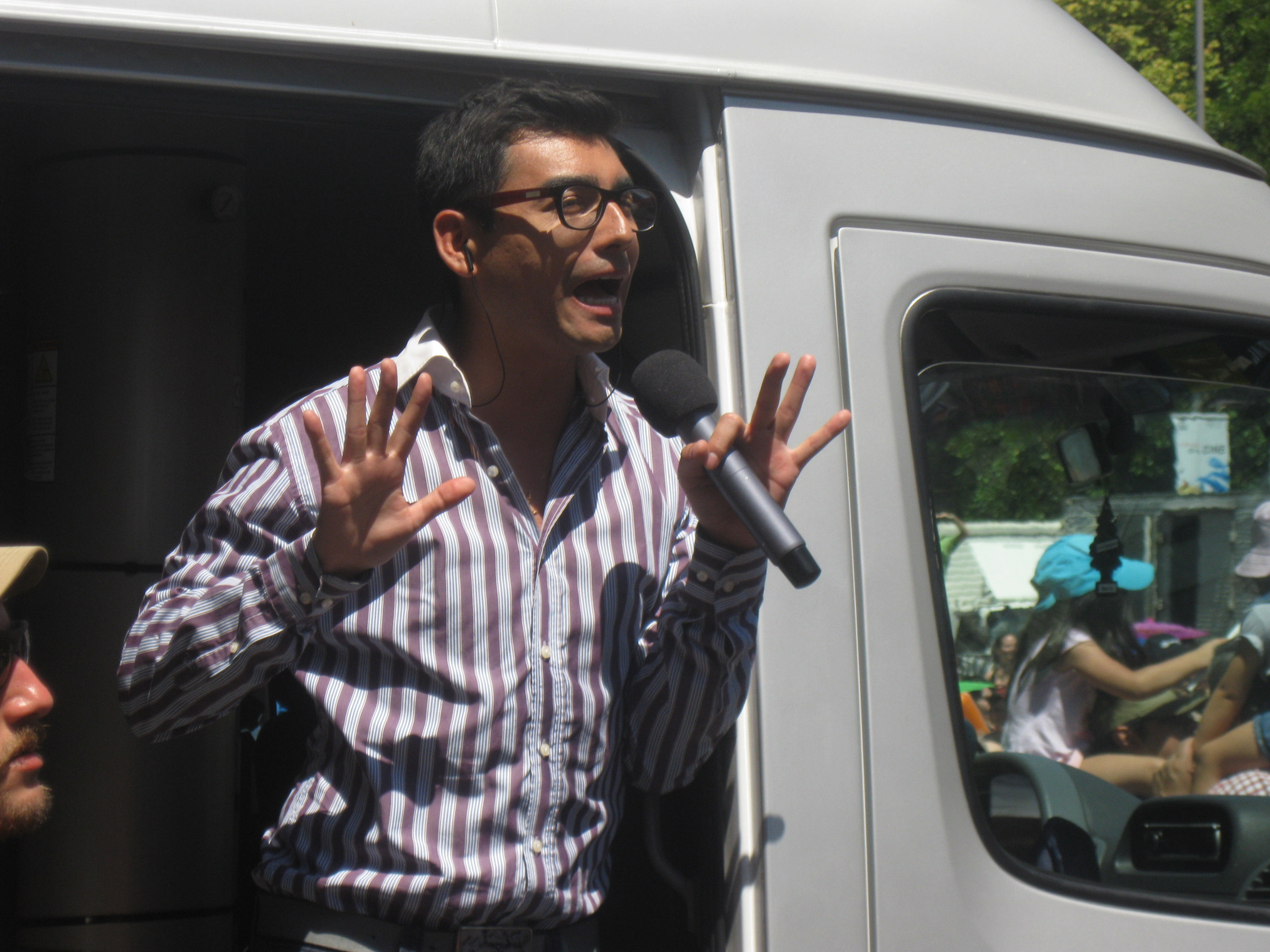
Caniulef reporting for Canal 13 in 2010.

Caniulef began his professional internship in 2002 at Canal 13 as a reporter for the channel's main newscast, Teletrece. Subsequently, he participated in various programs on the television station; he was an entertainment commentator on 6PM and Alfombra roja, a panelist on the morning show Bienvenidos, and a commentator on Tele13 online, where he interviewed numerous national and international celebrities, such as Madonna, Antonio Banderas, Ricky Martin, Coldplay, among others.

In 2014, Caniulef resigned from Canal 13 to join Chilevisión, where he worked as a panelist on the programs SQP and Maldita Moda, and co-hosted the program Sabingo with Carolina Mestrovic. In 2016, he took over hosting duties on SQP until the program's end in early 2017. During that year, he was also a panelist on the program La Mañana.

In July 2018, Caniulef left Chilevisión for personal reasons. He returned sporadically to television during that year, making comments on Bienvenidos from December 2018 to March 2019.

In November 2020, Caniulef returned to Bienvenidos, leaving the position in January 2021. Subsequently, he joined the TV+ program Me late, hosted by Daniel Fuenzalida.

In late 2022, Caniulef joined Mega, where he appeared on various programs commentating on entertainment and celebrity news, as well as hosting some shows. After almost two years with the network, he was dismissed from the station in August 2024. About a month later, he was confirmed for Canal 13's new reality show, Palabra de honor. He subsequently joined Hay que decirlo, the station's entertainment program, as a panelist.

== Personal life and death ==
In March 2016, Caniulef publicly came out as gay on an episode of SQP. Since then, he had dedicated himself to promoting the rights of gay Chileans. He was in a relationship with Sebastián Núñez from 2016, and they attended the 2017 Viña del Mar Festival Gala, becoming one of the first same-sex couples to kiss in public on the event's red carpet, alluding to a sign of "vindication and validation of sexual diversity." However, the relationship ended in 2017.

During mid-2018, Caniulef stepped away from television, being admitted to a psychiatric clinic in October of that year due to severe depression and drug problems. In April 2019, he entered a rehabilitation center. He completed his recovery in April 2020, graduating in August of that same year.

On 12 February 2025, Caniulef revealed that he had been HIV-positive for eight years and had kept it a secret all that time. He stated that the virus was undetectable and that he was therefore living a normal life.

Caniulef died on 9 January 2026, at the age of 48. According to official reports, he had been visiting an acquaintance in an apartment in downtown Santiago, in the Santo Domingo and Mac-Iver area. After feeling unwell, he fainted; SAMU (Emergency Medical Service) was contacted, and after providing first aid, they confirmed his death caused by a cardiac arrest.
