= 2016 in Chile =

- Decades: 1990s; 2000s; 2010s; 2020s
- See also: Other events of 2016; Timeline of Chilean history

Events in the year 2016 in Chile.

== Incumbents ==
- President: Michelle Bachelet

== Sport ==
- Chile at the 2016 Summer Olympics
- 2015–16 Chilean Primera División season
- 2016 Americas Rugby Championship

== Events ==
- 25 December: 2016 Chiloé earthquake
