= Admiral Nef Naval Hospital =

Naval hospital in Viña del Mar, Chile

- Chilean Navy
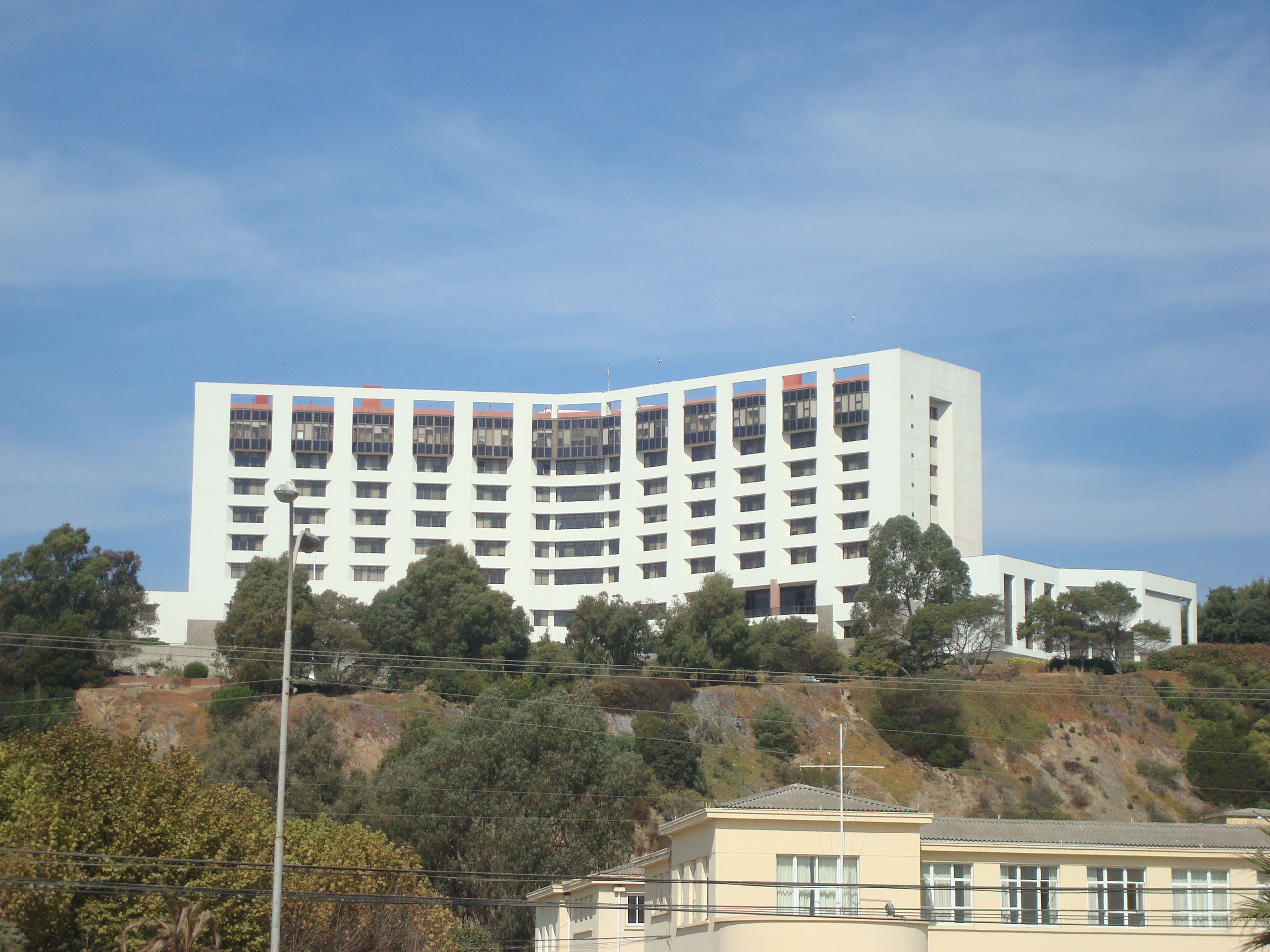

Geography
- Location: Viña del Mar, Chile
- Coordinates: 32°59′54″S 71°32′39″W

History
- Founded: 14 December 1927

Links
- Website: hospitalnaval.cl
- Lists: Hospitals in Chile

The Admiral Nef Naval Hospital (Spanish: Hospital Naval Almirante Nef) is the largest of the four hospitals in the health system of the Chilean Navy, located in Viña del Mar.

== History ==
It was originally established in Valparaíso on 14 December 1927 as the Valparaíso Naval Hospital. A government resolution dated 9 February 1933 renamed it the Admiral Nef Naval Hospital in honour of Admiral Francisco Nef, who fought to secure funding for the hospital's construction.

In the eighties, in an evaluation by the Health Directorate of the Chilean Navy, it became clear that hospital facilities were inadequate after an earthquake struck the city of Valparaíso in 1985 and the fire that occurred in boilers in the building. That is why the project was carried out of the new Naval Hospital. The concerns that are unique to a specific facility for the Armed Forces are reflected in the concept of design and architecture of the new building. That is why their equipment and infrastructure has the capacity to deal with emergency situations of war or natural disasters which have a high incidence of traumatic pathologies and burns.

New hospital facilities were transferred to the new building in the city of Viña del Mar on 14 December 1990. The Minister of National Defence, Mr. Patricio Rojas Saavedra, and the Commander in Chief of the Navy, Admiral Jorge Martinez Bush, presided over the ceremony.

== Chronology ==
- Opening of the Naval Hospital in Valparaiso. (1927)
- First Congress of Medicine and Surgery Naval and Military. (1929).
- First arteriography performed in Chile. (1931)
- For the first time in the world is achieved by directly treating the disease of Nicolas Fabre. (1939)
- Inauguration of the building next door for the Pensioner and Maternity Services. (1952)
- First heart transplant in Chile and second in the world in charge of Dr. Jorge Kaplan. (1968)
- Construction of the Naval Medical Research Institute Specialized. (1978)
- First liver transplant in the Naval Medical Research Institute Specialized.(1979)
- Moving patients to new hospital, from Valparaiso, Viña del Mar.(1990)
- Implement the Naval Health System.(1996)
- Opening of the Cancer Institute of Viña del Mar.(2000)
- Opening of the Intermediate Care Unit.(2005)
- Pioneer cloqueares Implants in Chile.(2006)
- Psychiatric Center Building.(2007)
- Implementing Integrated with 4 Levels Pavilion "Basic- Advanced- Advanced- Advanced Plus Plus HD."(2009)

== Clinical campus ==
Clinical Campus operates as the "Naval School of Health" of the Chilean Navy and has agreements with prestigious higher education institutions that provide public and private health-related careers and are accredited by the Ministry of Health of Chile to provide area of medical science careers and the Ministry of Education of Chile in the academic area, and these are:

- University of Valparaíso
- Andrés Bello University
- University of the Americas
- Duoc UC
