= 2015 Chilean storm =

Natural disaster in Chile

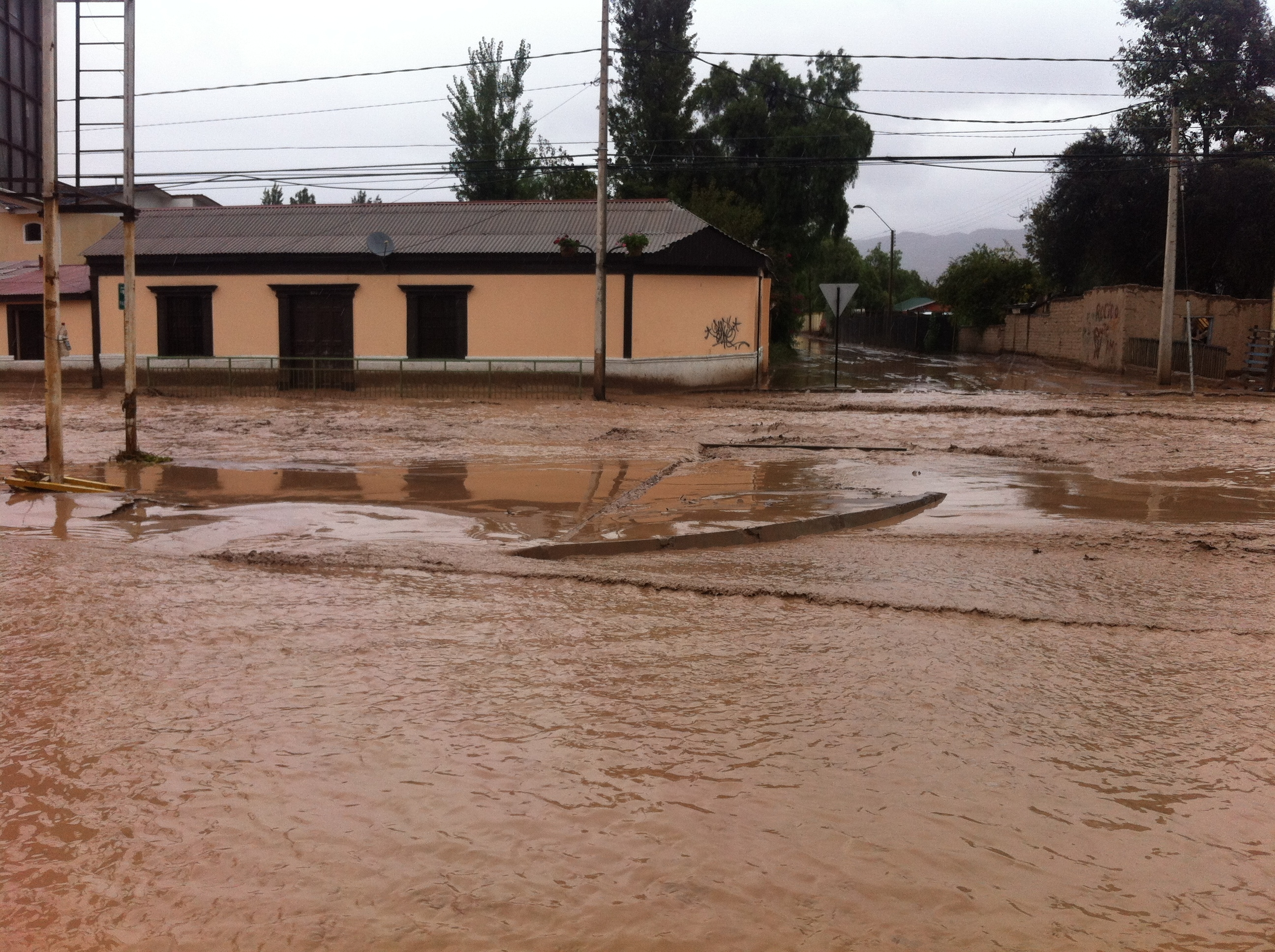
A street of Copiapó flooded by the overflow of the river of the same name (March 25, 2015).

The storm of northern Chile of 2015, an unusual meteorological event with a high concentration of rainfall — the product of a cold core registered on 24 and 25 March 2015 in the regions of Antofagasta, Atacama and Coquimbo — provoked in the third region of Atacama strong rainfalls in a short period of time, with the consequent flooding and overflow of the rivers Copiapó and El Salado, landslides, 22 deceased people — of the 25 who in total have died in the catastrophe — and dozens of missing persons. Isolated by route cuts, more than 28,000 victims; Homes destroyed and power cuts and fiber optics. President Michelle Bachelet initially declared a disaster zone and on 25 March constitutional state of emergency in the entire Atacama region, so the armed forces took control of the area. The meteorological phenomenon was described by the government as "the biggest rainfall disaster in 80 years."

== Origins of temperature ==
The heavy rainfall that has affected the Atacama region from 24 to 26 March has its origin in a cold core. These "have the characteristic of spinning around its axis and moving to then return to its original position, which is what happened."

The head of the Chilean Meteorological Directorate, Jaime Leyton, explained that the phenomenon "is not similar to a frontal system of a defined trajectory, which has an hour of start and one hour of calculable term. In this case, the distribution of cloudiness and precipitation (rains) is irregular in space and time, therefore, a zone of impact is defined, but it is impossible to identify the exact sector where it is going to manifest with greater intensity." Leyton also reported that in this case the phenomenon "does not have a trajectory of movement, but it circulates around a point and generates at different times a greater impact on geographic spatial coverage, of what usually happens. Therefore, it is a rare event, uncommon for the time of year, for intensity, and for coverage. It is comparable to a spinning top that is not known where it is going to fall, which is not known to which side will finish its fall.

== First reactions ==
=== Declaration of state of constitutional exception ===
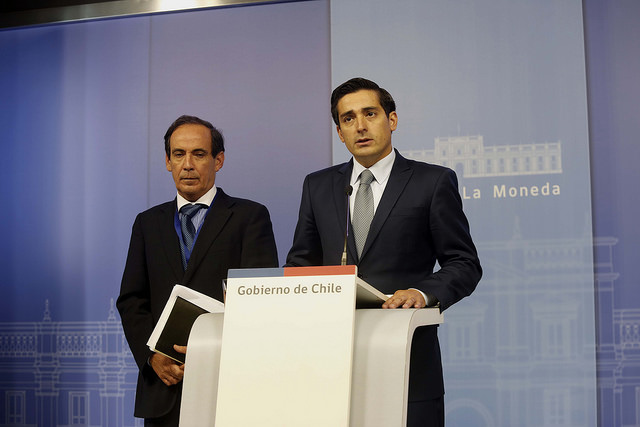
The Minister of the Interior Rodrigo Peñailillo informs to the citizens the decree of State of constitutional exception in Atacama.

On March 25, Minister of the Interior Rodrigo Peñailillo announced to the public that President Bachelet decreed a state of constitutional exception of catastrophe for the third region of Atacama, which means that the armed forces take control of the order The public and the shelter of the Atacama region.

Article 41 of the Constitution stipulates that the state of catastrophe may be declared by the President of the Republic in the event of a public calamity, determining the area affected by it. The President is obliged to inform the National Congress of the measures taken under the state of catastrophe. The National Congress may leave the declaration unaffected one hundred eighty days from this if the reasons that motivated it had ceased in absolute form. However, the President of the Republic can only declare the state of catastrophe for a period of more than one year with the agreement of the National Congress. Declared the state of catastrophe, the respective zones are under the immediate dependence of the chief of the national defense appointed by the President, who assumes the direction and supervision of his jurisdiction with the attributions and duties that the law designates.

=== Visit from President of Chile ===
President Michelle Bachelet arrived on 26 March at around 10:00 p.m. local time to Copiapó and toured the area of the tragedy. He also visited the shelters and led a meeting in the Atacama Intendencia along with local authorities.

=== Price hikes in first-need goods ===
Residents of the affected areas denounced the press and the authorities that some traders soared the prices of staple goods in an emergency situation such as the one living in the region, such as water, food and fuel, which they branded as "exploiters" in the face of a catastrophe. The authority on the subject, the National Consumer Service, on the other hand, emphasized that the government will oversee and persecute those who take advantage of the emergency situation and speculate on the prices of first-need products for the population.

The rules applicable to the speculative rise in the values of the first-need goods is Law No.16 282 in Chile, published in the Official journal in 1965. The standard stipulates that traders who sell food, changing rooms, tools, building materials, products, medicines and pharmaceuticals for use in human and veterinary medicine, household appliances, fuels, soap and goods that serve For the jewellery or wheel dressing of a dwelling, at prices superior to the officers or with deceit in the quality, weight or measure, or those that monopolize, hide, destroy or eliminate from the market, they will suffer the penalty of minor presidio in their minimum degree to half, that is to say, from 61 days to 5 years in prison.

=== Looting attempts ===
Once a state of emergency was declared, the armed forces took control in the area, decreeing a curfew that initially began at midnight. However, on the day of March 26 the timetable went ahead and the ban on circulating the city began at 11 pm, because of the risk of looting and theft. For the purpose, a contingent of military personnel was responsible for guarding trade headquarters, such as supermarkets and shopping malls that could have been looted during the night. For his part, the mayor of Diego de Almagro denounced looting in three supermarkets of his commune, which justified by the lack of basic goods.

=== Arrival of the armed forces to the area ===
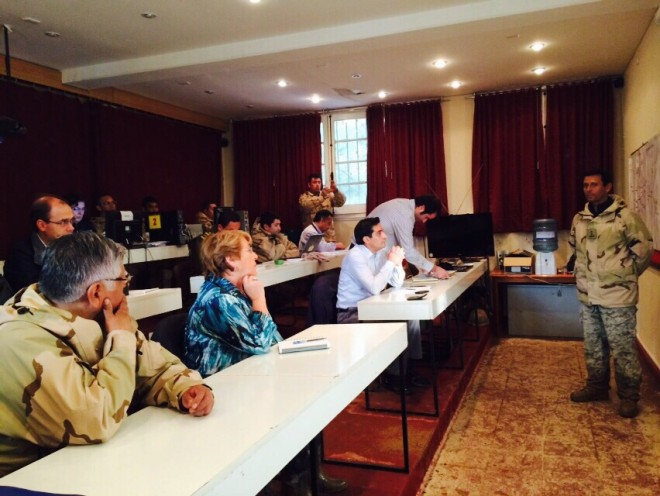
President Michelle Bachelet and Assistant Secretary Gabriel Gaspar in a meeting with the army for the storm of Atacama.

The government decreed a state of constitutional exception in the region, which is why a thousand soldiers took over the protection of public order and the aid tasks of the affected areas. Marcelo Urrutia, Lieutenant colonel of the Chilean Army, was appointed by the President of the Republic as authority in charge of the Atacama region.

=== Rescue of victims ===
On March 27 the conditions of the river El Salado propitiated the rescue of the inhabitants in Chañaral. Accompanied by troops of the Marine Corps, was able to connect to the locality that was divided after the river overflowed. The fall of the current allowed to unite and facilitate the return of many inhabitants who were isolated, even away from their families after the intrusion of the flow inside of Chañaral.

=== Hostel formation ===
On the day following the rainfall, the first shelters were formed to temporarily attend to the victims, including locations featuring a diverse population inside of multiple, government-formed hostels.

== Help shipments ==
The government enabled two bank accounts to help the victims of the tragedy in the north of the country. With two bank accounts, one storing Pesos, one storing USD, both associated with the Ministry of the Interior, were used for funding to provide help to citizens. For its part, the "Sergeant Aldea" ship of the Chilean Navy went to the area of the catastrophe, a ship that is implemented with beds, two operating rooms, dental clinic, X-ray room, laboratory and room for burners. Likewise, the U.S. federal government announced the delivery of 100,000 dollars in assistance for immediate relief efforts through emergency supplies such as beds, mattresses, blankets and toilet materials to sanitize households that have been affected by the flood. Delivery is made through the U.S. Agency's Overseas Disaster Relief office for the UNDESA.

== Cleaning and reconstruction work ==
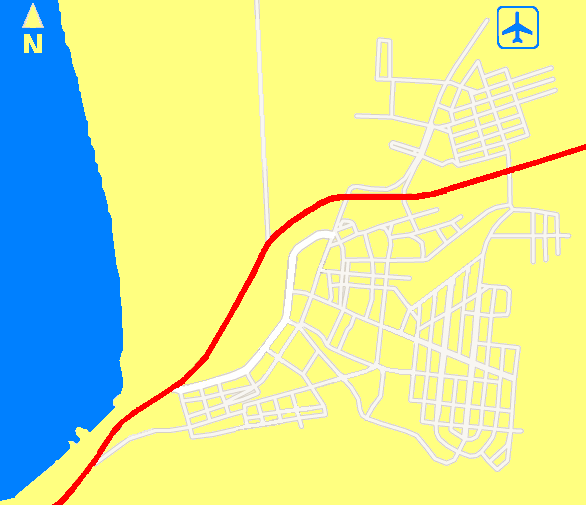
Map of the city of Chañaral. The northern sector of the city, in the upper part of Route 5 (in red), was isolated for two days, by the overflow of the river Salado.

The Ministry of Health has declared a health alert in all the places affected by heavy rainfall. The health care of Atacama, Brunilda Gonzalez explained that the health alert is with respect to particulate matter and liquid that could contaminate the area, from the miners that are in place. The main concern is to avoid respiratory and gastrointestinal diseases, therefore the recommendation is not to expose yourself to go out in the street to avoid breathing particulate matter that can be lifted.

For his part, the Minister of Public Works, Alberto Undurraga said that the cleaning work will take a long time, but now you can appreciate the amount of accumulated material that reached the center of the city, affecting many homes and shops Commercial. The material must be removed with the support of 100 backhoe machines in the city and in Chañaral.

== Consequences and effects of storm ==
=== Total deaths as result of storm ===
As of April 17, the official figure is 28 deceased and 63 disappeared, 25 of whom died in the Atacama region.

=== Victims ===
The director of the ONEMI, Ricardo Toro, has confirmed a total of 28,000 victims in the Atacama region.

== See also ==
- Weather warning
- List of natural phenomena
