= 2023 San Pedro de la Paz railway accident =

2023 Chilean Railway Accident

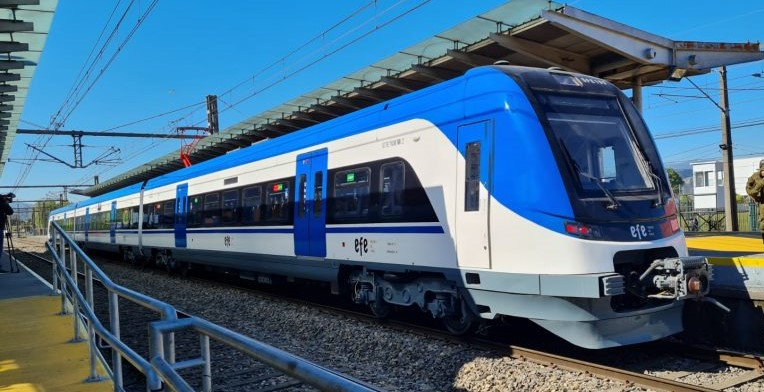
- A Biotren series SFE train similar to the one involved

Details
- Date: 1 September 2023; 08:00 (UTC−04:00)
- Location: San Pedro de la Paz, Biobío Region
- Coordinates: 36°50′27″S 73°07′44″W
- Country: Chile
- Line: Line 2
- Operator: Biotren (EFE South)
- Cause: Decision of the bus driver to cross a level crossing with the safety barriers down

Statistics
- Trains: CRRC Qingdao Sifang SFE-101
- Deaths: 8
- Injured: 12

On 1 September 2023, a train operating Biotren's Line 2 collided with a bus of the Greater Concepción bus service in San Pedro de la Paz, Chile. The collision killed eight people and injured seven others, including the bus driver. (Note: Most sources cite only seven fatalities since the eighth one came from long term injuries over a year and a half after the accident.) The collision is the worst accident in Biotren's history and is considered one of the worst railway accidents in Chilean history.

== Background ==
Biotren is a commuter rail system serving the city of Concepción and its surrounding area. According to EFE, the system carries around 50 thousand passengers each day, and about 9 million per year. The system began operation in 1999 with Line 1, which ran between El Arenal Station in Talcahuano and Valle del Sol station in Chiguayante. In 2005, the whole system was upgraded with an extension of Line 1 and the inauguration of Line 2, which ran between the Main Concepción station and Lomas Coloradas station. In 2016, Line 2 was extended, with its current terminus station being now located in Coronel. This gives Line 2 a total length of about 28 kilometres (17 mi), with 14 stations serving the communes of Concepción, San Pedro de la Paz and Coronel.

== Accident ==
The accident took place on 1 September 2023, at around 08:00AM local time on the level crossing in Daniel Belmar Avenue, in San Pedro de la Paz. At the time of the accident, the safety barriers in the crossing were lowered, preventing traffic from entering the train tracks since one of Biotren's trains, specifically a CRRC Qingdao Sifang Series SFE electric train with the serial number SFE-101, was approaching. The train was serving Line 2, and was heading towards Alborada station from the north after leaving Diagonal Biobío station carrying about 300 passengers. Moments before the accident, a bus driver by the name of Alejo Santander, driving Line 23 of the Greater Concepción bus service with 14 passengers on board decided to evade the safety barriers by driving through the wrong side of traffic (where the barriers did not cover the road) and entered into the active train tracks, which was common practice at that crossing. The bus that Santander was driving had an expired technical review, meaning that it was not roadworthy. Moments after Santander entred the tracks, the train collided with the left side of the bus, dragging it for about 200 meters before stopping.

=== Rescue ===
Firefighters, assisted by the Chilean Carabineros carried out the rescue of the accident's victims. The injured victims were transported to the Guillermo Grant Benavente Clinical Hospital in Concepción, including the bus driver, who was supposed to be detained but was let go to undergo medical treatment.

=== Casualties ===
The collision left all 15 occupants of the bus injured, eight of those fatally. Initially, four people were reported dead by the Carabineros, although the death toll quickly rose to five within a few minutes. The sixth fatality was reported two hours after the accident during a press conference. The seventh victim, the last to die from short-term injuries, died eight hours after the accident. The last person to perish because of the accident did so 19 months after said accident due to long-term injury complications. Of the eight victims, five died on the accident site, two either on transport or in the hospital in the day of the accident, and one died in the hospital from long-term injuries. Four of the victims were teachers working in local schools. Two of those teachers worked in the Nahuelbuta school, where sixteen years previously, two other teachers perished in a railway related accident.

==== Victims ====
- Soledad del Carmen Rioseco Marín
- Esteban Andrés Briceño Briceño, a history teacher in the Andes particular school
- Marcela Viviana Díaz Lagos, a mathematics teacher at Nahuelbuta school
- Ignacio Nicolás López Fierro, a doctor at the Boca Sur medical centre
- Pablo Andrés Figueroa Figueroa
- Bárbara Camila Bustamante Ravet, an English teacher at Nahuelbuta school.
- Claudia Ángela Yévenes Yévenes, a biology teacher at the Andes particular school, who was traveling with her daughter at the time of the accident.
- Elizabeth Soto, a concierge.

== Criminal proceedings ==
On 5 September 2023, EFE filed a criminal complaint against the bus driver, Alejo Santander. Fifteen days later, the families of two of the accident's victims also pursued legal action by filing criminal complaints against Santander. A fourth family also filed a complaint against the driver, but also against the San Pedro del Mar bus company and EFE. The last criminal complaint was filed by the Biobío presidential delegation.

On 17 October 2023, Santander was charged with seven counts of homicide, nine counts of causing severe injuries, one count of causing less severe injuries and one count of causing minor injuries. Santander attended the session via a videocall and was then put in pre-trial detention as a precautionary measure.

Santander's defence appealed the court's decision to the Court of Appeals of Concepción, where they requested a review of the precautionary measures, arguing that the driver should be investigated for negligent homicide and injury since he had no intentions of provoking harm. On 25 October, the court decided to keep the precautionary measures imposed against Santander. Another appeal to the ruling was presented to the court, this time claiming that Santander suffered from dissociative amnesia. On 20 December, the court again ruled in favor of keeping the precautionary measures. On 3 March 2025, the Prosecutor's office filed charges against Santander, threatening a sentence of over 20 years in prison.

=== Trial ===
The trial against Santander started on 8 August 2025. During the first hearing, the defence insisted that the actions of the driver were negligent and not intentional, whereas the complainants alleged that the recordings of the accident clearly show recklessness.

On 20 August, the court unanimously ruled a guilty verdict on seven counts of homicide, (Note: Ignacio Fierro, the eighth victim, was not counted as a homicide victim, his death was determined to be as a result of a crime of injuries) twelve of causing injury and one count of causing damages. The court established beyond any reasonable doubt the occurrence of the crimes and Santander's involvement in them. The prosecutor's office requested 26 years of jail time, 20 of them just for the homicides. On 1 September 2025, exactly 2 years after the accident, Santander was sentenced to 14 years and 61 days in prison plus a 5 UTM fine.

== Aftermath ==
The day of the accident, the San Pedro de la Paz Municipality declared a 3-day period of mourning.

Due to the accident, the Line 2 service of Biotren was suspended between 1 and 3 September. The service was then temporarily replaced by a group of 32 buses implemented by EFE, which ran through 4 stations along the route of Line 2.

Between 2 September and 3 November, the Ministry of Transport imposed a vehicle restriction along Route CH-160, between the communal limit of Coronel and the link with the Juan Pablo II Bridge.
