= Manola Robles =

Chilean journalist (1948–2021)

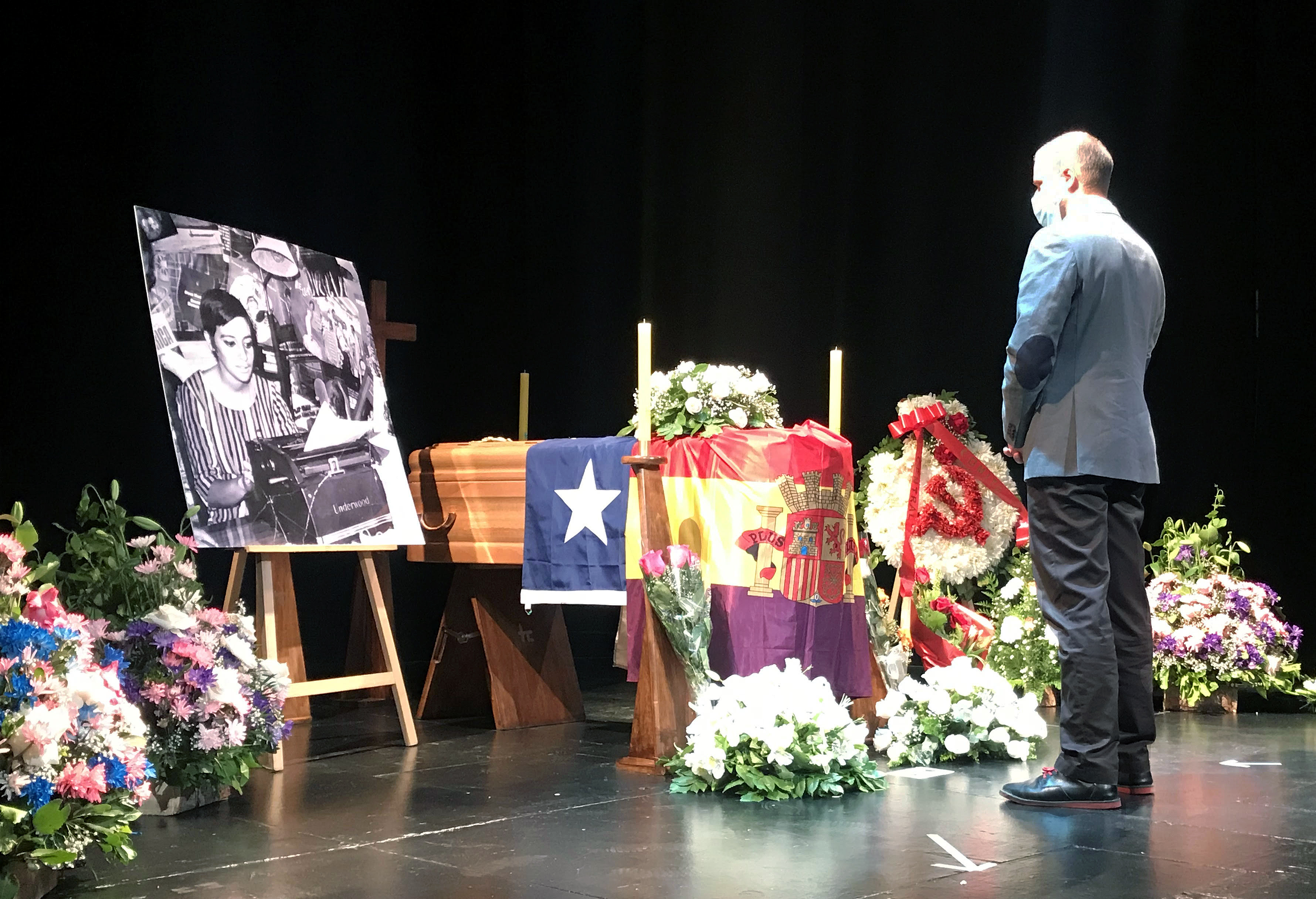
- Robles' casket during her funeral wake; a photo of her at work is displayed next to it
- Born: Manola del Carmen Robles Delgado; 1 November 1948
- Died: 3 January 2021 (aged 72)
- Education: University of Chile
- Occupation: Journalist
- Employer: Radio Cooperativa

Manola del Carmen Robles Delgado (1 November 1948 – 3 January 2021) was a Chilean journalist. She wrote primarily on economics and politics and worked for Radio Cooperativa in the 1980s, opposing the military dictatorship, and 1990s.
