= David Rosenmann-Taub =

Chilean poet, musician and artist (1927–2023)

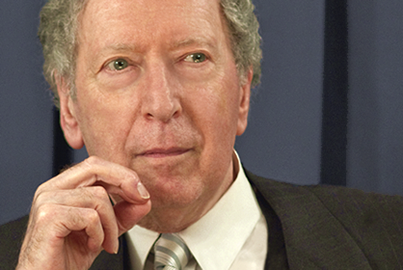
- Born: 3 May 1927; Santiago, Chile
- Died: 11 July 2023 (aged 96)
- Occupations: Poet, composer, graphic artist
- Writing career
- Language: Spanish
- Genre: Poetry
- Notable works: Cortejo y Epinicio, El cielo en la fuente, Quince, El Mensajero
- Website: www.davidrosenmann-taub.com/en/

David Rosenmann-Taub (3 May 1927 – 11 July 2023) was a Chilean poet, musician and artist. His precocious talent in both literature and music was recognized and encouraged by his father, a polyglot, and his mother, a virtuoso pianist. She began teaching him the instrument when he was two; by nine, he himself was giving piano lessons. He later studied composition, counterpoint and fugue with the celebrated composer Pedro Humberto Allende. He began writing poetry at a very early age; his first published work, a long poem titled El Adolescente (“The Adolescent”), was written at age fourteen and appeared four years later in a literary magazine.

Rosenmann-Taub graduated from the University of Chile in 1948. That same year he won the Sindicato de Escritores prize for his first book of poetry, Cortejo y Epinicio (Cortege and Epinicion), which received a reputation-making review from the preeminent literary critic of Chile, Hernán Díaz Arrieta (known as “Alone”). In the three decades that followed, Rosenmann-Taub published more than ten volumes of poetry, including Los Surcos Inundados (The Flooded Furrows), La Enredadera del Júbilo (The Vine of Jubilance), Los Despojos del Sol (The Spoils of the Sun), and El Cielo en la Fuente (The Sky in the Fountain). For Los Surcos Inundados, he received the Premio Municipal de Poesía, the Chilean equivalent of the Pulitzer Prize. His poetry has been admired by authors as disparate as Witold Gombrowicz, Victoria Ocampo, and Francis de Miomandre.

In 1976, he began to travel, lecturing on poetry, music, and aesthetics in Latin America, Europe, and the United States, where he settled in 1985. Since 2002 his writings have been published in Chile, along with reissues of his older works. Armando Uribe, the 2004 winner of Chile's Premio Nacional, described Rosenmann-Taub as “the most important and profound living poet of the entire Spanish language.”

Rosenmann-Taub died on 11 July 2023, at the age of 96.

== Poetry ==
- Cortejo y Epinicio (Cruz del Sur, 1948)
- Los Surcos Inundados (Cruz del Sur, 1951)
- La Enredadera del Júbilo (Cruz del Sur, 1952)
- Los Despojos del Sol (Esteoeste, 1976)
- Al Rey Su Trono (Esteoeste, 1983)
- Cortejo y Epinicio (LOM, 2002), ISBN 956-282-493-4
- El Mensajero (LOM, 2003), ISBN 956-282-594-9
- El Cielo en la Fuente/La Mañana Eterna (LOM, 2004), ISBN 956-282-634-1
- País Más Allá (LOM, 2004), ISBN 956-282-691-0
- Poesiectomía (LOM, 2005), ISBN 956-282-789-5
- En un lugar de la Sangre (Mandora, 2006), ISBN 978-0-9824718-0-7
- Los Despojos del Sol (LOM, 2006), ISBN 956-282-810-7
- Auge (LOM, 2007), ISBN 956-282-887-5
- Quince (LOM, 2008), ISBN 956-282-974-X
- La Opción (LOM, 2011), ISBN 978-956-00-0228-0
- La noche antes (LOM, 2013), ISBN 978-956-00-0412-3
- El Zócalo (LOM, 2013), ISBN 978-956-00-0420-8
- Cortejo y Epinicio: la tetralogía (LOM, 2013), ISBN 978-956-00-0419-2
- Los Surcos Inundados (LOM, 2014), ISBN 978-956-00-0563-2
- Oó,o (Pre-Textos, 2015), ISBN 978-84-16453-24-5
- Trébol de Nueve (LOM, 2016), ISBN 978-956-00-0645-5
- Alm-ería (Pre-Textos, 2017), ISBN 978-84-16906-37-6
- Jornadas (LOM, 2018), ISBN 978-956-00-1034-6
- Glosa (Mandora, 2020), ISBN 978-0-9824718-2-1
- Tílimtilín (LOM, 2021), ISBN 978-956-00-1471-9

== Anthologies ==
- Me incitó el espejo (DVD, 2010), ISBN 978-84-92975-10-5
- El horizonte cruza la casa (La Abeja de Perséfone, 2011), ISBN 978-607-487-350-4
- Multiverso (Mansalva, 2012), ISBN 978-987-1474-62-2
- El duelo de la luz (Pre-Textos, 2014), ISBN 978-84-15894-30-8

== Translations ==
- Quince (Bengali) (2010), ISBN 978-81-920265-0-3
- E poi, il vento (Italian) (Andrea Lippolis, 2010), ISBN 978-88-86897-51-8
- Cortège et Épinicie (French) (Bruno Doucey, 2011), ISBN 978-2-36229-020-6
- Antes que a luz trema (Portuguese) (2013) ISBN 978-989-643-109-9
- Il Plinto (Italian) (Le Lettere, 2017), ISBN 978-88-6087-983-7

== Selected musical works ==
- Dagger of Life (1994) - piano and synthesizer
- En un lugar de la Sangre (1997) - piano
- Fuegos naturales, I-III (1997) - piano solo, duet, trio and quartet
- Sonatinas de amistad, I-IV (1997) - piano duet
- Selecciones (2008) - piano and synthesizer
- Conversaciones (2010) - piano
- En un lugar de la Sangre (2013) - piano
- Primavera sin fin (2018) - piano, bongo, and synthesizer
