= Marino Penna =

Chilean politician (1929–2023)

Marino Alberto Penna Miranda

Member of the Chamber of Deputies
- In office 15 May 1965 – 11 September 1973
- Constituency: 4th Departmental Group

Mayor of Ovalle
- In office 1956–1958

Personal details
- Born: 18 January 1929 Ovalle, Chile
- Died: 4 January 2023 (aged 93) Santiago, Chile
- Party: Christian Democratic Party
- Spouse: Nelly Gaete
- Education: Universidad Técnica Federico Santa María (B.Sc)
- Occupation: Politician
- Profession: Chemical Engineer

Marino Alberto Penna Miranda (18 January 1929 – 4 January 2023) was a Chilean chemical engineer and Christian Democratic politician. He served as Deputy for the 4th Departmental Group from 15 May 1965 until the dissolution of Congress on 11 September 1973. He also served as Mayor of Ovalle from 1956 to 1958.

== Biography ==
He studied at Escuela N.º 3 and the Liceo de Hombres in Ovalle, and later at the Universidad Técnica Federico Santa María, where he graduated as a chemical engineer in 1952 with a B.Sc.

He managed the family tannery “Curtiembre Limarí” and worked in industries in María Elena and Valparaíso.

A member of the Christian Democratic Party (Chile), he held local and regional party roles, and participated in Eduardo Frei Montalva's 1964 presidential campaign.

Elected Deputy in 1965, he was reelected in 1969 and 1973. During his legislative career he served on the Committees on Finance; Agriculture and Colonization; and Mining.

Following the 1973 coup, Congress was dissolved. Later, in 1994, he worked as an analyst for CONICYT.

Penna died on 4 January 2023, at the age of 93.
