= El Salado =

Town in Sonora, Mexico

- Location within Sonora Location within Mexico
- Coordinates: 26°38′05″N 108°46′02″W
- Country: Mexico
- State: Sonora
- Municipality: Álamos
- Time zone: UTC-7 (Zona Pacífico)

El Salado is a town in the municipality of Álamos in the Mexican state of Sonora. It is 45.2 kilometres (28.1 mi) south southeast of Álamos and 30.3 kilometres (18.8 mi) northwest of El Fuerte, in Sinaloa. It lies on the left bank of the River Cuchujaqui at an elevation of 140 metres (460 ft). Its population at the time of its last census was 83 persons, 47 males and 36 females.
