= Ricardo Gálvez =

Chilean Supreme Court justice (1933–2024)

Ricardo Gálvez (10 March 1933 – 6 January 2024) was a Chilean lawyer, judge, and university professor. He served as the justice of the Supreme Court (1998–2008). Gálvez died on 6 January 2024, at the age of 90.

== Early life ==
Gálvez studied at the Faculty of Law at the Pontificia Universidad Católica de Chile and qualified as a lawyer on 16 November 1959. Since 1964 he has served as a professor of procedural law at his university.
