= Mane Nett =

Chilean actress (1948–2022)

- Born: María Eliana Nett Sierpe; 19 September 1948; Osorno, Los Lagos, Chile
- Died: 10 February 2022 (aged 73); Santiago, Chile
- Occupation: Actress

María Eliana Nett Sierpe (19 September 1948 – 10 February 2022) was a Chilean actress and cultural manager, mainly active in theatre and television.

== Life and career ==
Born in Osorno, Nett studied theatre at the Pontifical Catholic University of Chile. She made her professional debut in 1975, but had her breakout three years later, as co-protagonist of the telenovela El secreto de Isabel, which was followed by a number of other popular television works between 1980s and early 2000s, mainly for Canal 13. She retired from acting in 2005.

Besides her acting career, Nette was a prominent cultural activist and manager: among other things she was president of Sidarte (the Chilean Actors and Actresses Union) between 2002 and 2006, and a member of its board of directors from 2008 until 2020. She was president of the Chilean Coalition for Cultural Diversity. For her work she was given a special award during a UNESCO meeting in 2008. She was the author of the book Cultural Diversity: The Value of Difference.

Nett died on 10 February 2022, at the age of 73.
