= Hospital del Salvador =

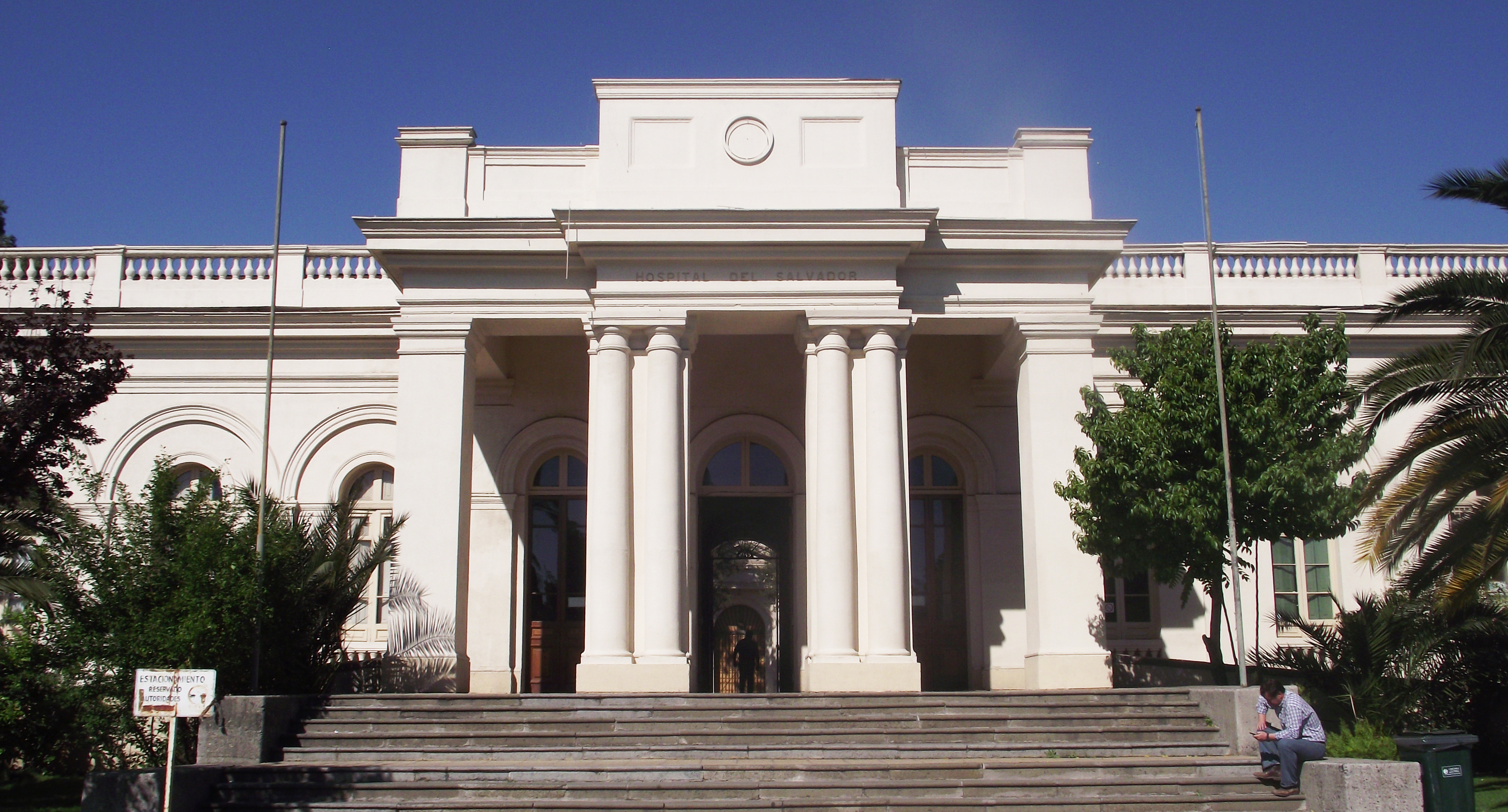

Geography
- Location: Santiago, Providencia, Chile
- Coordinates: 33.4371°S 70.6249°W

Organisation
- Type: General

History
- Opened: December 7, 1871

Links
- Lists: Hospitals in Chile

The Hospital del Salvador is in central Santiago, Chile and is located in the commune of Providencia.

== History ==
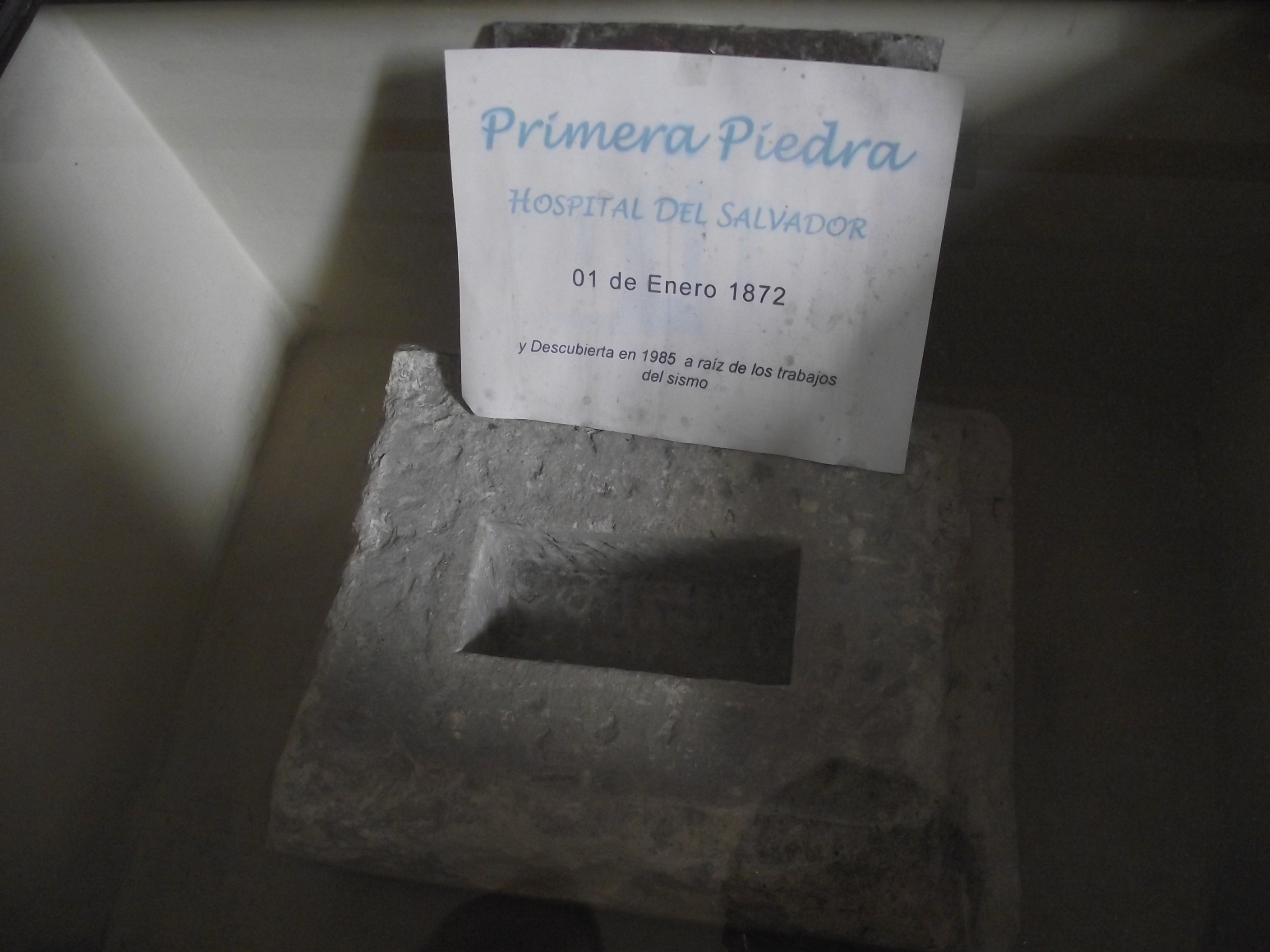
Foundation stone

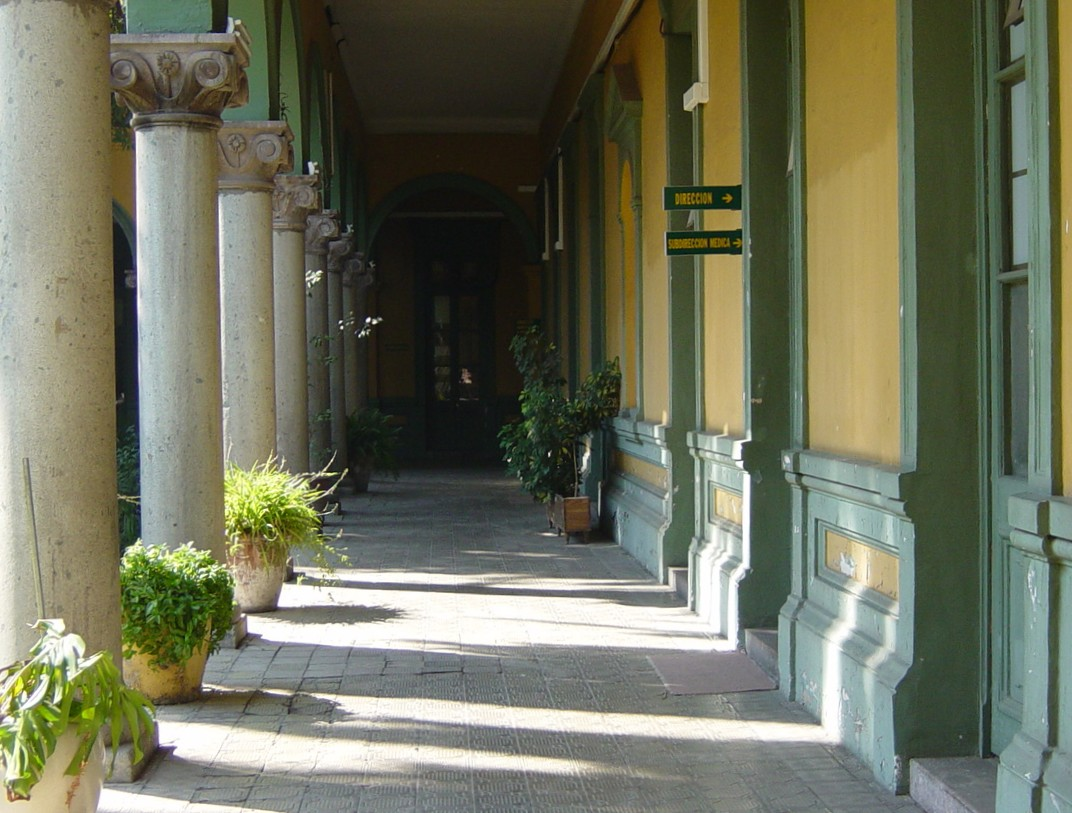
Hospital cloister

The hospital was founded on December 7, 1871, during the presidency of Federico Errázuriz Zañartu, in response to the high number of deaths caused by epidemics in Santiago. The foundation stone was laid on the site of the former Mercedarian convent on January 1, 1872. Construction was delayed by economic problems and by the War of the Pacific (1879–84). In 1888 a new hospital was designed by the architect Carlos Barroilhet, it was approved four years later.

Part of the hospital facade was destroyed by the 1985 Chile earthquake, this was soon repaired. Also in 1985, the main facade, the chapel, the buildings, halls and the park within the building complex were declared as historical monuments.
