= Oliver Welden =

Chilean poet (1946–2021)

Oliver Welden (1946 in Santiago, Chile – 31 January 2021) was an award-winning poet.

== Career ==
In 1968, he received the Luis Tello National Poetry Award of the Society of Chilean Writers for Perro del Amor, a collection of 23 of his poems. In the 1960s, Welden and his wife, Alicia Galaz Vivar, also published a poetry journal in Chile called Tebaida (Thebes).

== Works in English ==
- Love Hound, trans. by Dave Oliphant, 2006, Host Publications, Inc.
