= Hugo Álamos Vásquez =

Chilean politician (1932–2023)

Member of the Chamber of Deputies
- In office 11 March 1990 – 11 March 1994
- In office 15 May 1969 – 21 September 1973

Personal details
- Born: 22 August 1932 Santiago, Chile
- Died: 17 August 2023 (aged 90) Bulnes, Chile
- Party: PCU; PN; RN
- Education: Pontifical Catholic University of Chile
- Occupation: Agronomic engineer

Hugo Álamos Vásquez (22 August 1932 – 17 August 2023) was a Chilean agronomic engineer and politician. A member of the United Conservative Party, the National Party, and finally the National Renewal, he served in the Chamber of Deputies from 1969 to 1973 and again from 1990 to 1994.

Álamos died in Bulnes on 17 August 2023, at the age of 90.

== Early life and family ==
Álamos was born in Santiago, on 22 August 1932. He was the son of Hugo Álamos Ojeda and María Mercedes Vásquez Vargas.

He married Isidora Valverde León, who served as mayor of Bulnes for more than 15 years. They had two children.

He completed his primary and secondary education at The Grange School. He later enrolled at the School of Agronomy of the Pontifical Catholic University of Chile, where he obtained the degree of Agricultural Engineer. He subsequently undertook specialization studies in dairy farming in Australia and New Zealand.

He devoted himself to agricultural activities, managing the estate "El Roble" of the Álamos Ojeda family community, located in Bulnes.

== Political career ==
He began his political activities in 1959 when he was elected councilor (regidor) for Bulnes, being re-elected for two consecutive terms until 1968. He later served as mayor of the city, leaving office in 1969 to run for the Chamber of Deputies of Chile.

He joined the Conservative Party, serving as communal president between 1963 and 1965. He later became a member of the National Party, acting as its president in Ñuble. He subsequently joined National Renewal, where he also served as communal president in Ñuble.

Between 1977 and 1978, he was appointed zonal chief of the Agrarian Reform Corporation (CORA and COSAG). In 1978, he was elected member of the Communal Development Council (CODECO) of Bulnes and of the Regional Development Council of Biobío (CODERE).

He was actively involved in promoting the creation of cooperatives in Ñuble Province. He served on the board of the Livestock Committee of Bulnes, the Agricultural and Beet Cooperative (CAR Ltda.), and the Agricultural Cooperative of Quillón. He was director of the Rural Electric Cooperative of Chillán (COPELEC) and vice president of the National Federation of Electric Cooperatives of Chile.

He was also appointed counselor of the Union of Agricultural Cooperatives of Ñuble and Quillón, member of the Wine Cooperative of Quillón, and, between 1982 and 1988, director of the Agricultural School of the Pontifical Catholic University of Chile.
