= La Ligua River =

Location
- Country: Chile

The La Ligua River (Spanish: Río La Ligua) is a river in Chile.

== Location ==
The La Ligua River is located in Chile's Valparaiso Region, or the V Region of Chile. The river is located in the developing agricultural valley in the semi-arid Norte Chico. The river is surrounded by steep valleys that is both short and narrow. The dimensions of the valley is that it is approximately 20 km wide and 100 km long. The river’s basin is located at the foothills of the Andes Mountains and continues until it discharges in the Pacific Ocean, just north of the town of Papudo and south of the town of Longotoma. La Ligua River is unique in that its source is in the low part of Andes Mountains, which is important, in geographic terms, because the river only receives snowmelt in spring. This is compared to other rivers that originate in the high Andes, as they are fed by snowmelt throughout the year. Due to its location, the La Ligua River has a seasonal flow, which peaks in the spring during the snowmelt and reduces exponentially in the summer months. Besides the snowmelt, there is a shallow and unconfined aquifer underneath the river.

== Economic importance ==
The main usage of the La Ligua River is to provide water to the principal agricultural economy. Agriculture is split into mostly fruit industry and land for grazing animals, principally cattle and goats. Today, the main produce that comes from the La Ligua River area are avocados.

== History ==
=== Pre-agrarian reforms (pre-1960) ===
Chile, prior to the agrarian reforms of the 1960s, was dominated large land estates owned by rural based oligarchies. The peasants were split into two groups: permanent residents on the estate, known in Spanish as inquilinos, and day laborers, known in Spanish as afuerinos. These peasants were largely landless, minus the few inquilinos who were given small plots of land to do subsistence farming. This is indicated by a patron-client relationship, which dictated parts of social, political, and cultural life. Fifteen percent of Chilean peasantry were able to produce items to send to market during this time period.

=== Agrarian reforms (1960s–1970s) ===
The valley, along with the rest of Chile, underwent intensive agrarian reform in the mid-1960s. This is a result of President Eduardo Frei and his Christian Democratic Party, who rose to power in the mid-1960s with strong reformist attitude. This eroded the power of the rural based oligarchies. A major component of the agrarian reforms was the expropriation of large estates that were deemed to not be producing enough and forming collective farms. These collective farms were then allocated to peasants that were living on the large estates. Peasants were supported heavily by the state under Corporación de la Reforma Agricultura (CORA). In the first year of President Salvador Allende of the Unidad Popular coalition, more land was distributed in his first year in the presidency than the total six year rule of Eduardo Frei. At the same time, changes in the rural unionization law allowed for peasants to rapidly unionize and organize.

=== Introduction of neoliberal policies (1973–present) ===
After the 1973 coup, which ousted Unidad Popular President Salvador Allende and instituted a military dictatorship led by General Augusto Pinochet, land reforms were effectively scaled back. Pinochet reportedly declared that he wanted "to make Chile not a nation of proletarians, but a nation of proprietors", thus moving Chile into a free-market economy. In ending the land reform movements, many of the peasants began to sell their back, which leads to reconcentration of land in the hands of few. Around the La Ligua River, this leads to “the expansion and conversion of land to non-traditional export crops.” Beginning in the early 1990s, the area around the La Ligua River has shifted from producing annual crops for the domestic market, like beans, maize, potatoes, wheat, to permanent fruit plantations for export, like avocados, citrus fruits, nuts. The area around the La Ligua River that is dedicated to these export oriented crops doubled, from 3619 to 7503 hectares between 1997 and 2002.

=== Developments ===
==== The rise of the avocado ====
The development of new water/irrigation technologies and the availability of untilled rain-fed land on the valley sides has led to an boom of fruit plantations aimed at growing export-oriented goods. Well-drilling, pumps, and new irrigation technology became increasingly mass-produced and inexpensive in the 1990s, which has allowed for an increase usage of the La Ligua River and the aquifer that complements it. This allows for the increased popularity of avocado plantations, both by large fruit plantations and peasants alike.

==== Water security ====
Due to this, water has now been more highly sought. Since the environment is semi-arid, “water availability has become the key constraint to agricultural development in La Ligua, and securing supplies is a constant preoccupation for many farmers.” Dr Jessica Budds explains the water situation around the La Ligua River. “Chile operates a system of private water rights under the 1981 Water Code, in which applicants must apply for water rights to the National Water Directorate (DGA) for groundwater rights. DGA records show that the majority were from large and commercial farmers. By 1996, so many groundwater rights had been requested that the DGA calculated a basic groundwater balance, and concluded that no more rights should be allocated pending a rigorous groundwater assessment, designed in 1998 and carried out in 2002. Since the suspension, regularization became the principal mechanism for acquiring legal groundwater rights. However, it has been used mostly by large farmers, and has been widely abused.”

==== Mining activity ====
Grupo Minero Las Cenizas owns and operates two copper mines, El Sauce and Carmen Margarita, in the Cabildo area. On June 13, 2024 these mining operations suffered a tailings-mush spill and in June 2025 Dirección General de Aguas fined the company for the impacts of this in the waters of La Ligua River and in the ravine of Quebrada Chincorro.

== See also ==
- List of rivers of Chile
