= 2026 Chile nursing home fire =

Fire at a nursing home in Pitrufquén, Chile

- Date: 11 September 2026
- Time: 22:30 (CLST; UTC−03:00)
- Location: Vila Comuy, Pitrufquén, Chile
- Type: House fire
- Deaths: 16

On 11 September 2026, a fire broke out in the El Edén nursing home in Villa Comuy in Pitrufquén, Chile. Since 2019, the nursing home was subject to fines and enforcement proceedings over regulatory violations. At the time of the fire, 26 elderly residents were asleep in the building with 16 dying as a result of the fire and the remaining 10 taken to the hospital. A nearby highschool was used as a shelter for those affected.
