= Lonquimay Intercultural Community Hospital =

Hospital in Lonquimay, Chile

- Location within Chile

Geography
- Location: Manuel Rodriguez 1641, Lonquimay, Araucanía Region, Chile
- Coordinates: 38°27′30″S 71°21′56″W

Organisation
- Type: Community

Services
- Beds: 18

History
- Constructed: July 2020
- Opened: April 2024

The Lonquimay Intercultural Community Hospital (Spanish: Hospital Intercultural Comunitario de Lonquimay, Mapudungun: Lonquimay Tañi Lawentuwe Ruka) is a public community hospital serving the town of Lonquimay, and multiple other rural communities in Eastern Araucania, Chile. It was inaugurated in April 2024, becoming the second and biggest hospital in the town. The Hospital Complex consists of a Main building and multiple smaller buildings that are integrated into the complex.

== History ==
In 2018, the Ministry of National Assets assigned 2 fields on the south of Lonquimay summing 9831m² for the construction of a new Hospital in the town. Construction of the Hospital started in July, 2020, and progressed steadily throughout 2021, where the progress was reported as 30%. By early 2023, the progress was reported as 90%.

The Hospital began operations in April 2024, after an invertion of nearly 29 Billion Chilean Pesos. The official inauguration, which took place in August later that year, was attended by president Gabriel Boric.
