= Alicia Galaz Vivar =

Chilean poet and literary researcher

- Born: Alicia Galaz Vivar; December 4, 1936; Valparaíso, Chile
- Died: October 18, 2003 (aged 66); Tennessee, U.S.
- Known for: literary researcher, founder and director of the poetry magazine Tebaida

Alicia Galaz Vivar (December 4, 1936, in Valparaíso – October 18, 2003, in Tennessee) was a Chilean poet and literary researcher. She was the founder and director of the poetry magazine Tebaida.

== Biography ==
Galaz Vivar was born in Valparaíso and was a professor at the University of Chile of Arica (now the University of Tarapaca). Along with her husband, fellow poet Oliver Welden, she became a key figure in Tebaida, a culture magazine founded in 1968. They were forced into exile in 1975 in the aftermath of the Chilean military coup of 1973.

She received a doctorate from the University of Alabama and taught, starting in 1989, at the University of Tennessee at Martin. She retired with the rank of professor emeritus. She died in the town of Martin at her place of residence in 2003.

== Works ==
- La fábula de Píramo y Tisbe y la interpretación burlesca de la mitología grecolatina, essay, Ediciones de la Facultad de Filosofía y Educación, de la Universidad de Chile, Santiago, 1955.
- Análisis estilístico de la fábula de Píramo y Tisbe, de don Luis de Góngora, essay, Ediciones de la Universidad de Chile, Santiago, 1958.
- Antología anotada de Luis de Góngora, Editorial Universitaria, Santiago, 1961.
- Antología de romances, letrillas y sonetos de Luis de Góngora, Editorial Universitaria, Santiago, 1962 (reissued: Renacimiento, Santiago, 1970).
- Jaula gruesa para el animal hembra, poems, Ediciones Mimbre-Tebaida, Arica, 1972.
- Oficio de mudanza, poems, Editorial Betania, Madrid, 1987.
- Alta Marea: Introvisión crítica en ocho voces latinoamericanas, essay, Editorial Betania, Madrid, 1988.
- Señas distantes de lo preferido, poems, Ediciones LAR, Concepción, 1990.
