= Antonio Piraíno =

Chilean equestrian (1928–2020)

Medal record

Equestrian

Representing Chile

Pan American Games
Silver medal – second place	1971 Cali	Team dressage
Bronze medal – third place	1971 Cali	Individual dressage

Antonio Piraíno (12 August 1928 – 6 May 2020) was a Chilean equestrian who competed in the 1968 Summer Olympics.
