= Gabriel Prieto =

Chilean film, stage and television actor (1961–2026)

- Prieto in 2016
- Born: Gabriel Antonio Prieto Escobar; 2 February 1961; Santiago, Chile
- Died: 11 October 2026 (aged 65); Santiago, Chile
- Education: Pontifical Catholic University of Chile
- Occupations: Film, stage and television actor

Gabriel Antonio Prieto Escobar (2 February 1961 – 11 October 2026) was a Chilean film, stage and television actor. He appeared in over 30 films and television programs between 1984 and 2025, and was best known for playing Anselmo Cáceres in the Chilean telenovela Hasta encontrarte.

Prieto died in Santiago on 11 October 2026, at the age of 65.
