= Juan Ochagavía Larraín =

Chilean Jesuit theologian (1928–2026)

- Born: 1 June 1928; Santiago, Chile
- Died: 16 March 2026 (aged 97); Santiago, Chile
- Education: LMU Munich
- Occupation: Jesuit theologian

Juan Ochagavía Larraín (1 June 1928 – 16 March 2026) was a Chilean Jesuit theologian.

== Life and career ==
Larraín was born in Santiago on 1 June 1928. He was ordained a Catholic priest in 1957 and attended LMU Munich in Munich, Bavaria, where he obtained his doctorate. He accompanied Cardinal Raúl Silva Henriquez to the Second Vatican Council, as an expert.

Larraín was the dean and professor of theology at the Pontifical Catholic University of Chile from 1968 to 1970. From 1983 to 1991, he was general assistant to the Society of Jesus in Rome.

== Death ==
Larraín died in Santiago on 16 March 2026, at the age of 97.
