= Fernando Jara (footballer) =

Chilean footballer (1930–2023)

Personal information
- Full name: Fernando Jara Aninat
- Date of birth: 9 August 1930
- Place of birth: Valparaíso, Chile
- Date of death: 16 November 2023 (aged 93)
- Place of death: Vitacura, Chile
- Position: Midfielder

International career
Years	Team	Apps	(Gls)
- Chile

Fernando Jara Aninat (9 August 1930 – 16 November 2023) was a Chilean footballer who played as a midfielder. He competed in the men's tournament at the 1952 Summer Olympics. Jara died in Vitacura on 16 November 2023, at the age of 93.
