= Sybil Brintrup =

Chilean conceptual artist (1954–2020)

- Born: Sybil Brintrup Kruger; 11 May 1954; Puerto Montt, Chile
- Died: 12 August 2020 (aged 66); Santiago, Chile

Academic background
- Education: Pontifical Catholic University of Chile, 1978

Academic work
- Institutions: Universidad Santo Tomás; Universidad La República; Pontifical Catholic University of Chile
- Website: oficinadearte.cl

Sybil Brintrup Kruger (11 May 1954 – 12 August 2020) was a Chilean conceptual artist, writer, teacher and professor. Brintrup was known for her Los Romances project, which explored the romantic relationship between a woman and five objects: sheep, cows, lettuce, bales of hay, and tractors.

== Biography ==
Brintrup was born on 11 May 1954 in Puerto Montt. Initially studying education, Brintrup later enrolled at the Pontifical Catholic University of Chile where she studied aesthetics and fine art. In 1976, Brintrup worked at the university as a life drawing assistant before graduating with a specialization in painting in 1978.

During 1982 to 1983, Brintrup was a teacher of vitreous enamel techniques at the Cultural Center Mapocho (Spanish: Centro Cultural Mapocho). In 1983, Brintrup relocated to Belgium where she began working on the Los Romances. The Los Romances project explored the romantic relationship between a woman and five objects: sheep, cows, lettuce, bales of hay, and tractors. Between 1984 and 1990, the Los Romances was primarily conducted through mail art. In 1984, Brintrup held her first solo exhibition at the Central Library of Louvain-la-Neuve.

Returning to Chile, Brintrup worked in a private workshop as a teacher of vitreous enamel between 1986 and 1990, before working at the Bobenrietd & Brintrup design studio during 1990 to 1994. In 1992, Brintrup published her first artbook Vaca mía in concordance with an installation at the Chilean National Museum of Fine Arts. Brintrup's work are held in the collections of the National Gallery of Canada, the Hammer Museum and the Santiago Museum of Contemporary Art.

=== Professorship ===
Between 1994 and 2002, Brintrup worked as a professor at the Universidad Santo Tomás School of Graphic Design teaching model making and perception, and later lettering and drawing. From 2003 to 2006, Brintrup taught color at the Universidad La República, whilst also teaching the creativity development workshop at the Universidad Santo Tomás during 2003 to 2004.

Brintrup began a professor of color, video and performance at the Pontifical Catholic University of Chile in 2004.

== Bibliography ==
- Brintrup, Sybil (1992). Vaca mía. Bobenrieth & Brintrup. ISBN 9789567310012.
- Brintrup, Sybil (1994). Los romances: ella y las ovejas. Santiago, Chile: Cuarto Propio. ISBN 9789562600736. (Note: Also cited as 1995.)
- Brintrup, Sybil (2005). Los romances: ellas y las lechugas. Santiago, Chile: Chilean National Museum of Fine Arts. ISBN 9789568094003.
- Brintrup, Sybil (2009). Los romances: ella y los fardos de pasto. Santiago, Chile: Chilean National Museum of Fine Arts. ISBN 9789568094010.
