= Andrés Bello National University =

Private university in Chile

Andrés Bello University
- Universidad Andrés Bello
- Seal of the Universidad Nacional Andrés Bello
- Motto: Tradición y Modernidad
- Motto in English: Tradition and Modernity
- Type: Private
- Established: 1988
- Rector: Julio Castro Sepúlveda
- Students: 56,164 (2021)
- Undergraduates: 49,103
- Postgraduates: 7,061
- Location: (Chile) Santiago, Viña del Mar Concepción, Chile; 33.4514°S 70.6670°W
- Website: https://www.unab.cl

The Andrés Bello University (Spanish: Universidad Andrés Bello or Universidad Nacional Andrés Bello; UNAB) is a Chilean private university founded in 1988.

== Rankings ==
UNAB is ranked 56th among Latin American universities in 2022, and Andrés Bello University currently ranked 8th among Chilean universities according to the CSIC webometric.

== History ==
=== Foundation and definition of the project ===
The university was formally established in October 1988. In the early years, the university offered professions that required good infrastructure and facilities. The first specializations offered were Law, Architecture, Engineering, Business and Journalism. Civil engineering was added in its various manifestations: Civil Engineering, Accountancy and Psychology.

Engineering in Aquaculture, which has offered classes since 1993, was an initiative with University Andres Bello. In conjunction with this teaching program, the Marine Research Center was created at the same time in Caleta de Quintay. The Marine Research Center has become the leading provider of sea urchin seed in the country.

In 1996, when the university had nearly six thousand students and offered thirteen specializations, founding partners Luis Cordero, Ignacio Fernandez and Marcelo Ruiz formed the board of directors. The eight members included supporters Alvaro Saieh, Miguel Angel Poduje, Selume Jorge Andres Navarro and Juan Antonio Guzman.

Máximo Pacheco Gómez and William Elton Alamos, who alternates as vice president of the board, contribute to the project, as well as academics Joaquín Barceló and Manuel Krauskopf, who come to defog after owning the rectory.

== New institutional mission and autonomy ==
In Tables, academic influence is emphasized in the fields of science under the experience of the Quintay Marine Research Center, creating a field of biological sciences that increasingly involves physicians in the Jor-nothing regime. Later, the same is done in the fields of chemistry, physics, mathematics, philosophy and history.

The development of the philosophy and history programs also included a complete Bachelor of Science and Humanities program and entry into numerous other health professions, supported by extensive clinical agreements with various public and private sectors.

Likewise, the development of graduate programs began during the same period, with many graduates, masters, and doctorates highly complex individuals from the world of science.

== Internationalization and accreditation ==
University rankings

Global – Overall
- ARWU World: 901–1000 (2023)
- QS World: 1001–1200 (2024)
- THE World: 1501+ (2024)
- USNWR Global: =1140 (2023)

From the year 2000, University Andres Bello became the leading private university in the country. Every year it has a significant increase in students with indirect fiscal contributions, a government subsidy granted to the 27,500 best performers in the college selection test.

After evaluating alternatives, Chileans selected holders as a strategic partner for the Laureate Education Consortium. This alliance combines two essential attributes: on the one hand, the possibility of making a significant financial contribution and, on the other, a portfolio of academic experience that enjoys prestige in Europe and the United States through a network of universities and educational institutions, all accredited by agencies specializing in quality assurance.

Thus, the Laureate Education Consortium has achieved an important presence in the country's higher education through various educational projects carried out in Chile and aimed at different segments of higher education, offering programs ranging from technical training to more demanding and prestigious higher education.

The internationalization of the university has allowed its students to study abroad, complete dual degree programs, and incorporate English as a second language in their careers. This goal, in a very short term consolidation of a Department of English to serve the entire university community, and create a modern career with the best technological support to graduate teachers of this language in the context of national and international experiences.

In 2003, University Andres Bello was the first private university to join the establishment of a National Quality Assurance System in Chile, whose objective is to help higher education institutions develop mechanisms that ensure compliance with academic quality standards and continuous improvement. The university was one of the first three institutionally accredited private universities in Chile for the period between 2004 and 2008, a certification that confirmed that University Andrés Bello belongs to a select group of ten universities with the most complex and successful national higher education system, even though it is one of the youngest in the country.

All this is confirmed by the successes achieved in the gradual accreditation of each degree program, especially in the accreditation of degrees, an area where the University Andres Bello is an undisputed leader in terms of the scope and complexity of the programs offered and has also begun to be recognized by its merits and achievements.

In 2007, the university ranks first among all private universities in terms of prestige and in many respects ahead of many traditional universities. In 2008, the university is considered a national reference with about 30,000 students, which leads it to the decision to open a place of conception at the beginning of the 2009 academic year, in order to offer students in the South an alternative that will certainly be chosen by many students from different areas of the country. The University Andres Bello is a university with national characteristics that fits into the national ideology and is strongly committed to the development of human and social capital that characterizes the Chilean identity.

The university is accredited internationally by MSCHE.

On September 11, 2020, the Laureate Education Consortium group ended its operations in Chile and announced the transfer of its facilities in the country to "Fundación Educación y Cultura." This decision was made as part of strategic steps taken by the network. The reasons included the new actions that could be taken in the field of education after the creation of a new Constitution as a result of the referendum in Chile in 2020.

== Corporate seal ==
In the gallery of Doctor Honoris Causa, and contains the names of the poet Gonzalo Rojas (1998), National Book Award and the Cervantes Prize, Dr. Per-Ingvar Brånemark (2002), father of the Osseo-integrated implant, the psychiatrist Otto Kernberg (2003), director of the Institute for Personality Disorders at New York Hospital and author of numerous texts on psychiatry, Maximo Pacheco (2004), well-known scientist, minister of state, senator, and Chilean diplomat, and Dr. Alfred Sommer (2006), for their contribution to global health and human welfare. They joined José María Aznar (2006), for his public service, commitment to education, and dedication to the integration of Spain and Hispanic countries, the President of Colombia Álvaro Uribe (2006) and Chilean soprano Cristina Gallardo-Domâs (2007).

Large academic and national awards such as Miguel Arteche, National Book Award 1996, Alberto Israel, National Advertising Award 1995, Humberto Maturana, National Award for Natural Science 1994, Hugo Montes, National Award for Education 1995, Gonzalo Rojas, National Prize for Literature 1992, Pablo Valenzuela, National Award for Applied Science 2002 and Sergio Villalobos, National History Prize 1992.

== Organization ==
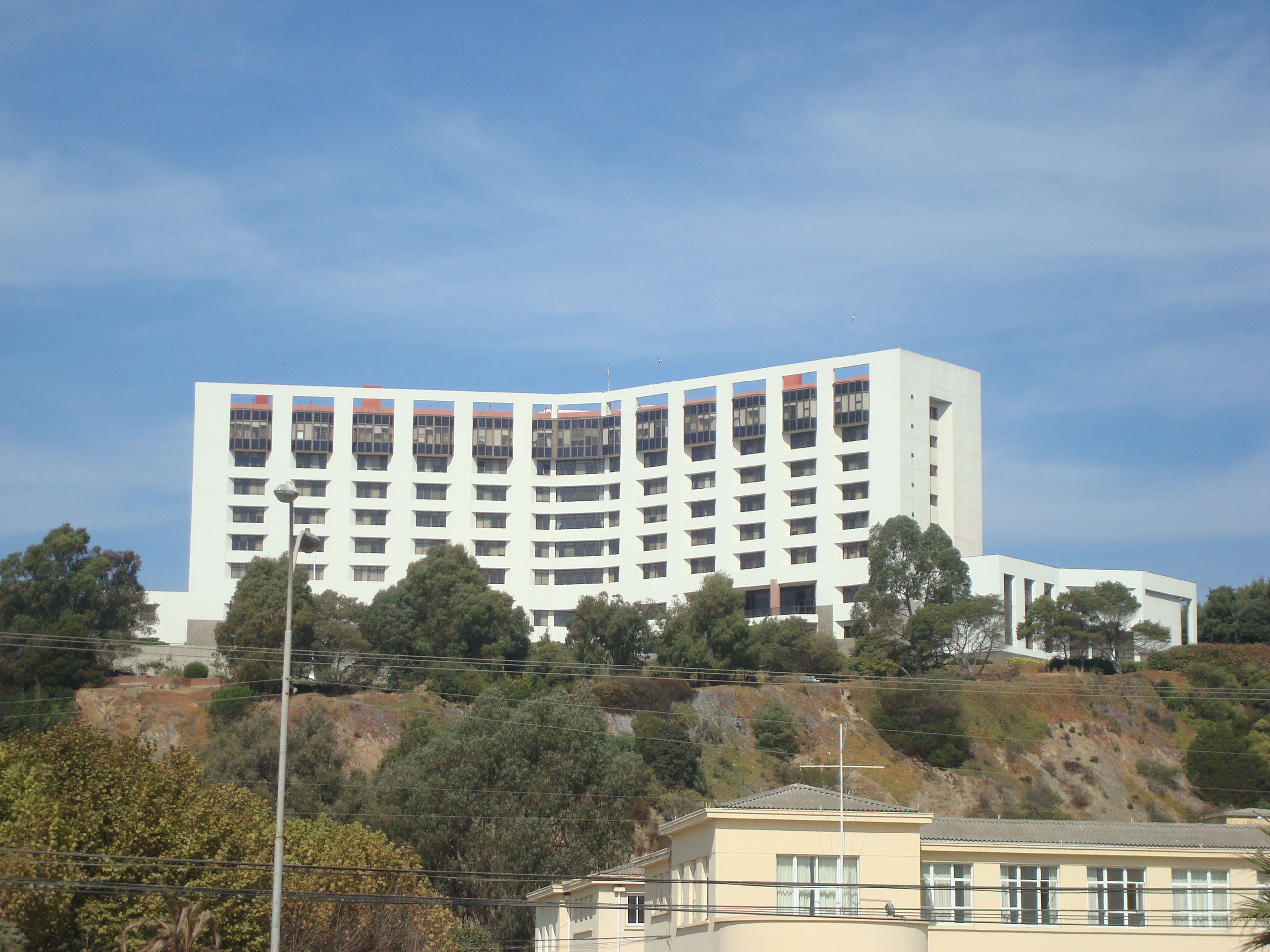
Admiral Nef Naval Hospital, clinical campus, Viña del Mar

=== Faculties ===
The university has 11 faculties

- Faculty of Arts, Architecture, Design and Communications (Creative Campus)
- Faculty of Education and Social Sciences
- Faculty of Exact Science
- Faculty of Economy and Business
- Faculty of Life Sciences
- Faculty of Rehabilitation Sciences
- Faculty of Law
- Faculty of Nursing
- Faculty of Engineering
- Faculty of Medicine
- Faculty of Dentistry

Access to web pages of former Faculties:

- Faculty of Architecture and Design
- Faculty of Social Sciences
- Faculty of Economy and Business
- Faculty of Biological Sciences
- Faculty of Rehabilitation Sciences
- Faculty of Law
- Faculty of Ecology and Natural Resources
- Faculty of Nursing
- Faculty of Humanities and Education
- Faculty of Engineering
- Faculty of Medicine
- Faculty of Dentistry
- Faculty of Interest and Maritime Services (Note: As of July 26, 2013, Page does not exist)
- Liberal Arts Program

=== AIEP Professional Institute ===
The AIEP Professional Institute within UNAB is an institute for technical and professional careers.

=== Sites and Campuses ===
- Santiago
  - Campus República
  - Campus Casona de Las Condes
  - Campus Bellavista
  - Campus Los Leones
  - Campus Antonio Varas
  - Campus Creativo Recoleta
- Viña del Mar
  - Campus Viña del Mar
  - Centro Deportivo
- Concepción
- Research Facilities
  - Marine Research Center in Quintay, Chile (CIMARQ)
  - Plant Biotechnology Centre
