= Navy Day (Chile) =

Chilean national holiday

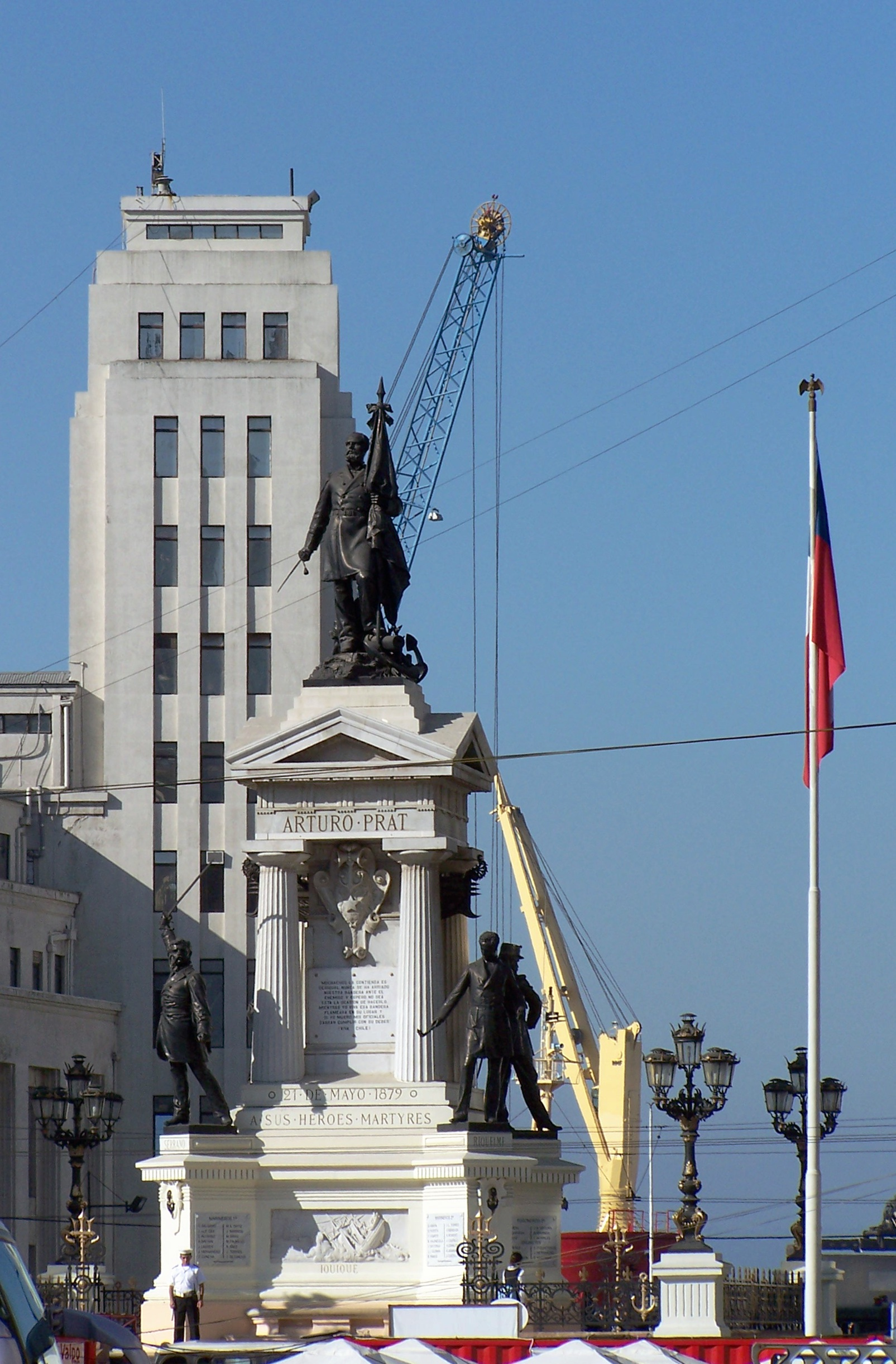
Heroes of Iquique monument in Sotomayor Square, Valparaíso, Chile.

Day of Naval Glories (Wrongly simplified as Naval Day) is a Chilean national holiday (Spanish: Día de las Glorias Navales, literally Day of Naval Glories) celebrated on May 21 each year. The day was selected to commemorate the Battle of Iquique, which occurred on May 21, 1879, during the War of the Pacific. The day is an official holiday and until 2016 was the traditional day for the Annual Statement of the President of Chile (Spanish: La Cuenta Anual del Presidente de la República de Chile), also known as the Mensaje Presidencial or Discurso del 21 de mayo), until it was moved on June 1 in 2017 to avoid major protest actions on that day (the practice returned in 2019).
