= Indictment and arrest of Augusto Pinochet =

Arrest of the dictator for crimes against humanity (1990s–2000s)

Augusto Pinochet
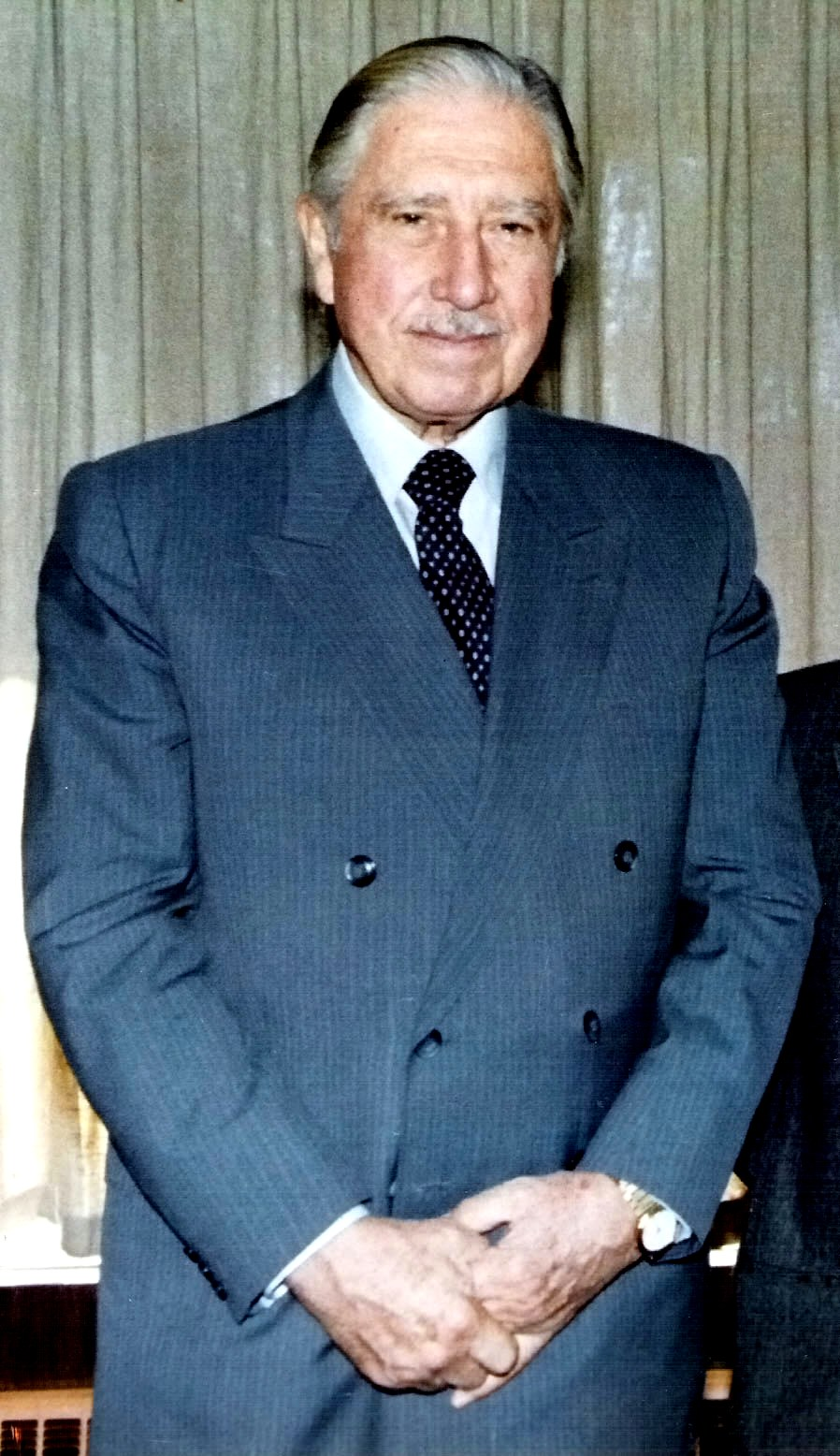
- Status: Deceased
- Criminal charges: Caravan of Death; Assassination of Carlos Prats; Operation Condor; Operation Colombo; Villa Grimaldi; Carmelo Soria; Calle Conferencia; Antonio Llidó; Eugenio Berrios; Tax evasion; Passport forgery

General Augusto Pinochet ruled Chile as head of a military junta from 1973 to 1990. He was indicted for human rights violations committed in Chile under his rule by Spanish magistrate Baltasar Garzón in 1998. He was arrested in London six days later, the first foreign head of state to be detained under the principle of Universal Jurisdiction. Following his detention, he was held under house arrest for a year and a half, before being released by the British government in 2000 following a series of landmark extradition hearings. Authorised to return to Chile, Pinochet was subsequently indicted by judge Juan Guzmán Tapia and charged with several crimes. He died in 2006 without having been convicted.

Pinochet led the 1973 coup, backed by a number of citizens, which deposed Socialist President Salvador Allende. His 17-year regime was notorious for many human rights violations. Among the most notable of these was Operation Condor, an clandestine effort to suppress left-wing political opponents in Chile and abroad, often in coordination with foreign intelligence agencies. Pinochet was also accused of using his position to pursue personal enrichment through embezzlement of government funds, the illegal drug trade and illegal arms trade. The Rettig Report found that at least 2,279 people were conclusively murdered by the Chilean government for political reasons during Pinochet's regime, and the Valech Report found that at least 30,000 people were tortured by the government for political reasons.

Pinochet's attorneys, headed by Pablo Rodríguez Grez (former leader of the far-right group Fatherland and Liberty), argued that he was entitled to immunity from prosecution first as a former head of state, then under the 1978 amnesty law passed by the military junta. They also claimed that his alleged poor health made him unfit to stand trial. A succession of judgments by various Courts of Appeal, the Supreme Court, medical experts, etc., led to Pinochet's subsequent house arrest and release, before he died on 10 December 2006, just after having been again put under house arrest on 28 November 2006 in the Caravan of Death case.

At the time of his death in 2006, Pinochet had been implicated in over 300 criminal charges for many human rights violations, including the Caravan of Death case (case closed in July 2002 by the Supreme Court of Chile, but re-opened in 2007 following new medical advice), Carlos Prats's assassination (case closed on 1 April 2005), Operation Condor (case closed on 17 June 2005), Operation Colombo, the Villa Grimaldi, Carmelo Soria, Calle Conferencia, Antonio Llidó and Eugenio Berrios cases, tax evasion and passport forgery.

== Timeline ==
=== Arrest in London ===
In 1998, Pinochet, who at the time continued to wield considerable influence in Chile, travelled to the United Kingdom for medical treatment; allegations have been made that he was also there to negotiate arms contracts. While in London, he was arrested on 16 October 1998 under an international arrest warrant issued by judge Baltasar Garzón of Spain, before he was placed under house arrest: initially in the London Clinic where he had just undergone back surgery, later in a rented house. The charges included 194 counts of killings of Spanish citizens, the 1975 assassination of Spanish diplomat Carmelo Soria, in addition to one count of conspiracy to commit torture – allegations of abuses had been made numerous times before his arrest, including since the beginning of his rule, but had never been acted upon. Grappling with the conditions set by Chile's turbulent transition to democracy, the coalition government known as Concertación and headed by President Eduardo Frei Ruiz-Tagle opposed his arrest, extradition to Spain, as well as trial.

A hard-fought 16-month-long legal battle ensued in the House of Lords, then the highest court of the United Kingdom. Pinochet claimed immunity from prosecution as a former head of state under the State Immunity Act 1978. This was rejected by a majority of the Law Lords (3–2), who ruled that some international crimes, such as torture, did not grant a former head-of-state immunity. However, the judgement was set aside in a subsequent, unprecedented case on the basis that one of the judges involved was potentially biased due to his ties to Amnesty International, a human rights organization that had campaigned against Pinochet for decades and acted as an intervenor in the case. A third ruling in March 1999 confirmed the original verdict; this time, the Lords held that Pinochet could only be prosecuted for crimes committed after 1988, the year in which the United Kingdom implemented legislation ratifying the United Nations Convention Against Torture in the Criminal Justice Act 1988. This invalidated most, but not all, of the charges against Pinochet and gave the green light for his extradition to Spain to proceed.

In April 1999, former UK Prime Minister Margaret Thatcher and former US President George H. W. Bush called upon the British government to release Pinochet. They argued that Pinochet should be allowed to return to his homeland rather than be extradited to Spain. On the other hand, United Nations High Commissioner of Human Rights, Mary Robinson, hailed the Lords' ruling, declaring that it was a clear endorsement that torture is an international crime subject to universal jurisdiction. Furthermore, Amnesty International and the Medical Foundation for the Care of Victims of Torture demanded his extradition to Spain. In protest against Spain's action, Chile withdrew its ambassador from Madrid for a time. Thatcher sent Pinochet a bottle of single malt whisky during this time, with a note saying "Scotch is one British institution that will never let you down".

Meanwhile, questions began to emerge in the media about Pinochet's allegedly fragile health. After medical tests were conducted, Home Secretary Jack Straw ruled in January 2000 that the former dictator should not be extradited to Spain. This triggered protests from human rights NGOs; it led the Belgian government, along with six human rights groups (including Amnesty International), to file a complaint against Straw's decision before the International Court of Justice (ICJ) in January 2000. Belgium, as well as France and Switzerland, had deposed extradition requests in the wake of Spain's demand. Despite protests by legal and medical experts from several countries, Straw finally ruled, in March 2000, that Pinochet had to be set free and authorized his return to Chile. On 3 March 2000, Pinochet returned to Chile. His first act upon landing in Santiago de Chile's airport was to triumphantly stand up from his wheelchair to the acclaim of his supporters. The first person to greet him was his successor as head of the Chilean Armed Forces, General Ricardo Izurieta. President Ricardo Lagos, who had just been sworn into office on 11 March, said the retired general's televised arrival had damaged Chile's international reputation, while thousands held demonstrations against the ex-dictator.

Despite his release on grounds of ill health, the unprecedented detention of Pinochet in a foreign country for crimes against humanity committed in his own country, without a warrant or request for extradition from his own country, marked a watershed in international law. Some scholars consider it one of the most important events in legal history since the Nuremberg Trials of Nazi war criminals. Judge Garzón's case was largely founded on the principle of universal jurisdiction – that certain crimes are so egregious that they constitute crimes against humanity and can therefore be prosecuted in any court in the world. The British House of Lords ruled that Pinochet had no right to immunity from prosecution as a former head of state, and could be put on trial. In Spain, the Court of Appeal of the Audiencia Nacional affirmed Spanish jurisdiction over Argentine and Chilean cases, declaring that domestic amnesty laws (in the case of Chile, the 1978 amnesty law passed by Pinochet's regime) could not bind the Spanish courts. Both for matters concerning the "Dirty War" in Argentina and for Chile, they characterized the crimes as genocides. However, both the Spanish and British rulings relied not on international law, but on domestic legislation: "They talked about universal jurisdiction, but grounded their decision in domestic statutory law."

The arrest of Pinochet has been characterized as a watershed moment in the international justice regime. According to Daniel Krcmaric, the arrest "marked the first time in the modern international system that a current or former head of state was arrested in a foreign country for international crimes."

=== Return to Chile ===
In March 2000, after Pinochet's return, the Chilean Congress approved a constitutional amendment creating the status of "ex-president", which granted Pinochet immunity from prosecution and guaranteed him a financial allowance. In exchange, it required him to resign his seat of senator-for-life. 111 legislators voted for; 29 against. Despite this political move, on 23 May 2000, the Court of Appeal of Santiago lifted Pinochet's parliamentary immunity concerning the Caravan of Death case. This was confirmed by the Supreme Court of Chile, which voted on 8 August 2000, by 14 votes against 6, to strip Pinochet of his parliamentary immunity. On 1 December 2000, judge Juan Guzmán Tapia indicted Pinochet for the kidnapping of 75 opponents in the Caravan of Death case – Guzmán advanced the charge of kidnapping on the grounds that the victims were officially "disappeared": even though they were most likely dead, the absence of their corpses made any charge of homicide difficult. Shortly after, on 11 December 2000, the ruling was suspended by the Court of Appeal of Santiago on medical grounds. In addition to the Caravan of Death, 177 other complaints were filed against Pinochet.

In January 2001, medical experts stated that Pinochet was suffering from "mild dementia", which did not impede him from being prosecuted before the courts. Subsequently, judge Guzmán ordered his arrest in late January 2001. However, the judiciary procedures were again suspended on 9 July 2001 because of alleged health reasons. In July 2002, the Supreme Court dismissed Pinochet's indictment in the various cases on medical grounds (an alleged "vascular dementia"). That same year, the prosecuting attorney Hugo Guttierez, who headed the Caravan of Death case, declared that "Our country has the degree of justice that the political transition permits us to have." Shortly after the verdict, Pinochet resigned from the Senate, thus benefiting from the 2000 constitutional amendment granting him immunity from prosecution. Thereafter, he lived a quiet life, rarely made public appearances and was notably absent from events marking the 30th anniversary of the coup on 11 September 2003.

=== House arrest ===
On 28 May 2004, a Court of Appeals voted 14 to 9 to revoke Pinochet's dementia status and, consequently, his immunity from prosecution. In arguing its case, the prosecution presented a recent television interview Pinochet had given for a Miami-based television network. The judges found that the interview raised doubts about the alleged mental incapacity of Pinochet. On 26 August, in a 9 to 8 vote, the Supreme Court upheld the decision. On 2 December, a Santiago Appeals Court stripped Pinochet of immunity from prosecution over the 1974 assassination of General Carlos Prats, his predecessor as Army Commander-in-Chief, who was killed by a car bomb while in exile in Argentina. On 13 December, Judge Juan Guzmán Tapia placed Pinochet under house arrest and indicted him over the disappearance of nine opposition activists and the murder of one of them during his regime. However, the Supreme Court reversed the Appeals Court ruling in the Carlos Prats case on 24 March 2005, thereby upholding Pinochet's immunity. Later that year, on 14 September, the Supreme Court decided to strip Pinochet of his immunity in the Operation Colombo case involving the killing of 119 dissidents. The following day, he was then acquitted of the human rights case due to his purported ill health. In late November, he was once again deemed fit to stand trial by the Chilean Supreme Court and indicted, this time for the disappearance of six dissidents who had been detained by Chile's security forces in late 1974. He was placed under house arrest on the eve of his 90th birthday.

In July 2006, the Supreme Court upheld a January judgment by the Court of Appeal of Santiago, which argued that the 2002 Supreme Court's ruling stating that Pinochet could not be prosecuted in the Caravan of Death case did not apply to two of its victims, who were former bodyguards of Salvador Allende. On 9 September, Pinochet was stripped of his immunity by the Supreme Court. Judge Alejandro Madrid was thus able to indict him for the kidnappings and tortures at Villa Grimaldi. Furthermore, Pinochet was indicted in October 2006 for the assassination of DINA biochemist Eugenio Berríos in 1995. On 30 October, Pinochet was charged with 36 counts of kidnapping, 23 counts of torture, and one of murder for the torture and disappearance of opponents of his regime at Villa Grimaldi. On 28 November 2006, judge Víctor Montiglio, charged with overseeing the Caravan of Death case, ordered Pinochet's house arrest. However, Pinochet died a few days later on 10 December, without having been convicted of any crimes committed during his administration.

== Tax fraud and foreign bank accounts ==
The U.S. Senate Permanent Subcommittee on Investigations released a report on 15 July 2004 concerning Riggs Bank, which had solicited Pinochet and controlled between US$4 million and US$8 million of his assets. According to the report, Riggs participated in money laundering for Pinochet, setting up offshore shell corporations (referring to Pinochet as only "a former public official"), and hiding his accounts from regulatory agencies. The report said the violations were "symptomatic of uneven and, at times, ineffective enforcement by all federal bank regulators, of bank compliance with their anti-money-laundering obligations". In 2006, Pinochet's total wealth was estimated to be at least $28 million.

Five days later, a Chilean court formally opened an investigation into Pinochet's finances for the first time, on allegations of fraud, misappropriation of funds and bribery. A few hours later, the state prosecutor, Chile's State Defense Council (Consejo de Defensa del Estado), presented a second request for the same judge to investigate Pinochet's assets, but without directly accusing him of crimes. On 1 October 2004, Chile's Internal Revenue Service ("Servicio de Impuestos Internos") filed a lawsuit against Pinochet, accusing him of fraud and tax evasion, for the amount of US$3.6 million in investment accounts held at Riggs between 1996 and 2002. Furthermore, a lawsuit against the Riggs Bank and Joe L. Allbritton, chief executive of the bank until 2001, was closed after the bank agreed in February 2005 to pay $9 million to Pinochet's victims in compensation for its money-laundering activities on behalf of Pinochet.

Pinochet could have faced fines in Chile totaling 300% of the amount owed, and prison time, if he had been convicted before his death. Aside from the legal ramifications, this evidence of financial impropriety severely embarrassed Pinochet. According to the State Defense Council, his hidden assets could never have been acquired solely on the basis of his salary as president, Chief of the Armed Forces, and Life Senator.

=== BAE Systems ===
In September 2005, a joint-investigation by The Guardian and La Tercera revealed that the British arms firm BAE Systems had been identified as having paid more than £1m to Pinochet through a front company in the British Virgin Islands, which BAE has used to channel commissions on arms deals. The payments began in 1997 and lasted until 2004. BAE had tried to conclude a deal in the 1990s to sell Chile a rocket system and as of 2005 was trying to sell it naval electronics. The Chilean Army reportedly spent $60 million on the Rayo rocket system on a joint-venture with BAE Systems starting in 1994, before abandoning the project in 2003. Since 2001, British legislation outlaws corruption of foreign public officials (part 12 of the Anti-terrorism, Crime and Security Act 2001).

=== Charges against Pinochet and family members ===
In November 2005, Pinochet was deemed fit to stand trial by the Chilean Supreme Court and was indicted and put under house arrest on tax fraud and passport forgery charges but was released on bail; however, he remained under house arrest due to unrelated human rights charges.

This tax fraud filing, related to Pinochet's and his family's secret bank accounts in the United States and in Caribbean islands, for an amount of US$27 million, shocked the pro-Pinochet wing of Chilean public opinion more than the accusations of human rights abuses. Ninety percent of these funds would have been raised between 1990 and 1998, when Pinochet was Commander-in-Chief of the Army, and would essentially have come from weapons traffic (when purchasing Belgian Mirage fighter aircraft in 1994, Dutch Léopard tanks, Swiss Mowag tanks or by illegal sales of weapons to Croatia, in the middle of the Balkan war; the later case has been linked by Chilean justice with the assassination of Colonel Gerardo Huber in 1992). General Pinochet was reported to have owed the Chilean tax administration a total of $16.5 million.

In that case, Pinochet's immunity was stripped by the Appeal Court of Santiago, and confirmed by the Supreme Court on 19 October 2005. The legal proceedings could have eventually led to a trial against Pinochet, his wife Lucia Hiriart and one of his sons, Marco Antonio Pinochet, who was sued for complicity. Judge Juan Guzmán Tapia was skeptical, however, of the probability of a trial, either for human rights violations or for financial fraud. Nonetheless, indications from a number of medical examinations suggested that the physical and mental condition of the former dictator would have allowed him to be prosecuted. On 23 November 2005, judge Carlos Cerda charged Pinochet for fraud and ordered his arrest. Pinochet was freed under caution on the grounds that "his freedom did not represent a danger for the security of the society". This was the fourth time in seven years that Pinochet was indicted and charged for illegal behavior.

On 23 February 2006, Pinochet's wife Lucia Hiriart, children Augusto, Lucía, Jacqueline, Marco Antonio, and Maria Verónica, daughter-in-law, and personal secretary were indicted on charges of tax fraud, including failing to declare bank accounts overseas, and using false passports. Lucía fled to the US, but was detained and returned to Argentina, her country of departure, after attempting unsuccessfully to claim political asylum. Pinochet's wife, five children, and 17 other persons (including two generals, one of his ex-lawyer and his ex-secretary) were arrested in October 2007 on charges of embezzlement and use of false passports in the context of the Riggs affair. They are accused of having illegally transferred $27m (£13.2m) to foreign bank accounts during Pinochet's rule.

== Impact in Chile ==
In Chile where most of the politics was organized around the parties' position on Pinochet's dictatorship the arrest came as a "shock". The arrest of Pinochet strained Chile's centre-left governing coalition Concertación. President Eduardo Frei Ruiz-Tagle's government that handled the case up to March 11, 2000, had three ministers who had been victims of Pinochet's regime. Pinochet was also suspected to have had a hand in the death of Eduardo Frei Montalva, the president's father. To appear to be defending Pinochet abroad was reportedly an uncomfortable situation, but this depended on considerations of the internal politics of Chile and in particular the governments relation with the Chilean Army. Minister of the General Secretary of Government Jorge Arrate, who had been an exile in the Netherlands during the dictatorship saw positively on the news, while former president Patricio Aylwin considered that crimes committed in Chile should not be judged abroad. The Chilean government's lawyer involved in the case declared explicitly that the country was not defending Pinochet but its "judicial sovereignty".

The heightened political animosity surrounding the case led to disturbances both in and outside the Congress of Chile during the Presidents' Public Account of May 21, 1999, in Valparaíso. On June 22, 1999, in what is judged a direct consequence of the arrest and indictment of Pinochet, Frei Ruiz-Tagle shuffled his cabinet. Arrate was changed for Carlos Mladinic and Edmundo Pérez Yoma was appointed minister of National Defense, among other changes. In the Socialist Party, Arrate was part of a larger group that was contrary to the government's position. The polarized atmosphere the detention had caused in Chile is reported to have been detrimental to the Socialist Party's candidate for the 1999–2000 Chilean presidential election, Ricardo Lagos. Lagos went nevertheless to on to win the Concercación primaries defeating the Christian Democrat Andrés Zaldívar, and then narrowly defeated Alliance's Joaquín Lavín in the second round.

== Allegations during Pinochet's last days ==
In 2006, General Manuel Contreras, head of the Chilean secret police DINA under Pinochet, alleged in a testimony sent to Judge Claudio Pavez (overseeing the Huber case) that Pinochet and his son Marco Antonio Pinochet had been involved in the clandestine production of chemical and biological weapons, and in the production (under Eugenio Berríos's direction), sale and trafficking of cocaine. These allegations were never fully investigated by the Chilean courts, nor by a government commission set up to establish their veracity.

Fifteen years of investigations also revealed that Pinochet was at the center of an illegal arms trade organized around FAMAE (Factories and Arsenals of the Army of Chile), which received money from various offshore and front companies, including the Banco Coutts International in Miami. One of the deals notably included the transfer of 370 tons of weapons to Croatia, which was under UN embargo because of the war against Serbia. Another involved a 1995 arms contract with Ecuador which gave rise to kickbacks, some of which ended up in Pinochet's bank accounts abroad.

== See also ==
- Operation Condor
- Chile under Pinochet
- Chilean transition to democracy
- Chilean political scandals
- Leonard Hoffmann, Baron Hoffmann
- Pinocheques
- Pinochet in Suburbia, 2006 docudrama
