= Pablo Rodríguez Grez =

Chilean politician (1937–2025)

Leader of Fatherland and Liberty Nationalist Front
- In office 1 April 1971 – 13 September 1973
- President: Salvador Allende
- Preceded by: Created movement
- Succeeded by: Dissolved movement

Personal details
- Born: 20 December 1937 Santiago, Chile
- Died: 9 December 2025 (aged 87)
- Party: National Advance (1983–1990); National Action (1983–1987); Fatherland and Liberty (1971–1973); Radical Youth of Chile
- Parent: Manuel Rodríguez Valenzuela (father)
- Education: University of Chile, 1962
- Occupation: Politician; lawyer; academic

Academic work
- Institutions: University of Chile; Universidad del Desarrollo

Pablo Rodríguez Grez (20 December 1937 – 9 December 2025) was a Chilean politician, lawyer and academic. In 1971, Rodríguez founded Fatherland and Liberty, a far-right paramilitary group, and was an opponent of Presidency of Salvador Allende. A supporter of Augusto Pinochet, Rodríguez served as Pinochet's lawyer from 1974 until his death in 2006.

Rodríguez was a lecturer in civil law at the University of Chile's faculty of law from 1978 and was a partner at the law firm Rodríguez Vergara y Compañía.

== Early life ==
Pablo Rodríguez Grez was born on 20 December 1937 in Santiago, Chile to Manuel Rodríguez Valenzuela, the Minister of Education. In 1956, Rodríguez's father died by suicide following an investigation by the comptroller general.

Rodríguez graduated in legal and social sciences in 1960 from the faculty of law at the University of Chile, then received his law degree in 1962. He also received the Pedro Nicolás Montenegro award in 1960.

== Political life ==
Rodríguez was a strong opponent of Salvador Allende. In 1970, alongside right-wing youth figures such as Jaime Guzmán, he founded the Comité Cívico Patria y Libertad, a committee designed to prevent Allende's election. Some of the committee's ideals, such as anti-communism and opposition to the UP, served as inspiration for the Fatherland and Liberty party. These groups generally had nationalist ideals and connections to the armed forces, such as the Juventud Anticomunista de Chile.

=== Fatherland and Liberty ===
Rodríguez founded the Fatherland and Liberty party on 1 April 1971, at an event at the stadium Nathaniel in the heart of the capital, later becoming head. It emerged as an opposition to the government of Salvador Allende and which had supposed support from the CIA. He preached nationalist and fascist ideals (especially Italian fascism) and that Congress, along with the country's traditional parties, were responsible for the economic crisis.

The movement did not have many members, but it had some power in politics. The movement carried out terrorist acts and sabotage against the Allende government, such as the murder of Arturo Araya Peeters. They attempted a strike in 1972, but failed. The movement had contact with Armored Regiments (Nº2), in which they attempted a coup in June 1973, with tanks in the streets and bomb attacks, in which it became known as “Tanquetazo”, which was also unsuccessful. After the failed coup attempt, he and other officials sought asylum at the Ecuadorian embassy: he lived in Quito for two months before returning to Chile clandestinely from Argentina.

=== Military dictatorship ===
Rodríguez dissolved the movement after Pinochet's coup in 1973. He tried to gain Pinochet's trust, even though he disagreed with the economic policy adopted, which was liberal and he was corporatist. Pinochet ignored much of the advice from Rodríguez, who did not have much influence on the regime, even though he played a leading role in the coup that toppled Allende. He advised Pinochet not to respect the courts and crack down on Christian Democracy, saying that his supporters wanted the Junta Militar to fail and that the University of Chile became an "umbrella for Christian Democracy." He expressed his loyalty to the regime after saying: "I am the most modest soldier, the most humble, but the most loyal to this cause" and that: "our position is one of absolute and unconditional support for the government".

In 1983, Rodríguez, Federico Willoughby-MacDonald and Gastón Acuña founded the National Action Movement (MAN), after the political opening in 1983 by minister Sergio Onofre Jarpa. In 1987, the MAN disbanded after leader Willoughby-MacDonald left the party.

=== 1989 presidential candidate ===
Between 1988 and 1989, he tried to be a candidate for the presidency in the presidential elections by National Advance, in which he hoped to receive the support of the government, but he failed after the lack of support from sectors of the right (especially UDI and RN) and the government, in which he supported the candidacy of Hernán Büchi.

After Patricio Aylwin's victory in the 1989 election, Pinochet called an urgent meeting in La Moneda with various officials, including Rodríguez. He showed Pinochet a typewriter and stated that he could write a letter to render Aylwin's election null and void. Pinochet looked at him silently, but then ignored him.

=== Later participation in politics ===
Rodríguez focused on legal practice after losing the 1989 election, in which, after defending Pinochet from criminal proceedings, he became the target of protests in 2006, against his terrorist past and his relationship with human rights violations, among others. On average, there were 500 people at the protest, in which protesters held up signs calling him a terrorist.

In the same year (2006), they tried to reconstitute Fatherland and Liberty, but the proposal did not receive support and Rodríguez himself rejected it, stating: “Under my leadership, Fatherland and Liberty will never be reconstituted”.

== Criminal accusations ==
In general, he was accused of 1970s terrorism and sabotage, especially against Salvador Allende, by Fatherland and Liberty. He was even investigated by the Human Rights Investigations Police, for the terrorist attacks, in which they would be financed by the CIA, and the collaboration with the Pinochet coup in 1973. He denied the accusations that Fatherland and Liberty had murdered someone and that would have been funded by the CIA.

In October 1970, he held a demonstration at the Catholic university, in which a high-powered bomb had exploded at the stock exchange agency and then a dynamite attack hit the Providencia branch of Banco Francés e Italiano.

There were also other terrorist attacks and sabotage, especially in the period of Tanquetazo, where there were bomb attacks and destruction of private property in an attempt to overthrow Allende.

In July 1973, Fatherland and Liberty militants murdered Arturo Araya Peeters, in which he and members of Fatherland and Liberty were prosecuted and arrested by the naval prosecutor's office, but were released after some "paps on the ears", except Guillermo Claverie, in which he claimed that was innocent and had been a scapegoat for Rodríguez. All the conspirators were pardoned by Pinochet in 1981, for “services rendered to the Fatherland”.

== Lawyer career ==
=== Augusto Pinochet's lawyer ===
Rodríguez was Pinochet's lawyer until his death in 2006. He defended Pinochet on the criminal charges that came under his rule, even though he was disappointed in Chilean justice. Pinochet died on 10 December 2006, leaving several cases pending.

==== Operation Colombo ====
Rodríguez defended Pinochet in the Operation Colombo Case, in which Pinochet had been accused of being an actor in an operation that caused 119 opponents to be executed or disappeared in 1975. He defended Pinochet with energy, in which he denied the torture, disappearances or murders committed by the regime. and that "this is an offense to the figure of Pinochet". He accused the courts of manipulation and later waived the amparo claim.

==== Caravan of death ====
Rodríguez also defended Pinochet from the “Caravan of Death” investigations, in which he was first prosecuted in 2000 by Juan Guzmán Tapia. Pinochet had been accused of being the author of crimes committed by the Caravan of Death, led by Sergio Arellano Stark in 1973, executing 75 political prisoners. Rodríguez was confident that the court would overturn the charges and sent seven lawyers together.

==== Riggs Case ====
Another case that Rodríguez defended was the Riggs Case, along with Fernando Rabat Celis. He defended Pinochet and Lucía Hiriart, in which Pinochet had been accused of embezzling public funds, held in secret accounts at Riggs Bank. He stated about the case that: "We are going to appeal to the court for this to be sanctioned in an exemplary way, because it is not possible for situations of this kind to occur in Chile", in addition to saying "there are abundant antecedents that motivate the decision on the existence of the crime of embezzlement of public funds, substantiated accusations (...) that these persons participated in this crime".

=== Other cases ===
Rodríguez was a partner at the law firm Rodríguez Vergara y Compañía, along with three other partners.

He defended the savers of the union-run financial company La Familia, which had gone bankrupt in 1977, causing Rodríguez to issue an arrest warrant against Jaime Guzmán, being informed of the warrant at an airport, in which Rodríguez was criticized by unionists and Chicago boys.

Rodríguez also defended Walmart from accusations of violating the Consumer Protection Act in 2013, along with Pedro Pablo Vergara, in which he claimed the law came to establish 6 months before the lawsuit.

== Political views ==
Rodríguez's ideals were linked to the ideals of Fatherland and Liberty, which were generally based on nationalism or ultranationalism, anti-communism, economic corporatism, the fascist matrix, rejection of Marxism and capitalism and the establishment of a "functional democracy". In general, his views are considered traditional and right-wing.

Other ideals could be anti-oligarchic, anti-imperialism and anticlericalism, in which they appeared in a proposed constitution of the Frente Nacional y Popular.

As mentioned, he has a corporatist economic opinion, on which he based himself on Francisco Franco's corporatist theses, ignoring neoliberalism, which made him diverge from Pinochet.

His anti-communism is eminent when he praised the dictatorship's repression, in which he told Pinochet and his colleagues that "ultimately, the Chilean government, the military and the Armed Forces saved the country from a thousand years of communism" and also that: "It was he who led the rescue of Chile from the hands of communism, which today, abusing public credibility, is dressed in sheep's clothing, flaunting its false democratic ideals."

Even though he was loyal to Pinochet, he criticized the Pinochet government in relation to authoritarianism, stating that: “So to say that we are not within this rule of law within this concept of authoritarian government, in my opinion, is a fallacy that does us a lot of harm”.

Rodríguez defended the 1980 constitution, being against the change, saying that it is dangerous because (according to him) it would ideologize the country, in addition to saying that it prevented "totalitarianism" between 1970 and 1973.

He was also in favor of private campuses and a strong critic of Chilean education, saying that Chilean education “desires to impose a totalitarian ideology”. He criticized education stating: “the reality of our higher education in the last five decades shows a growing deterioration of academic quality, precisely because it has been the favorite terrain of those who try to subject it to its obscurity”.

== Academic life ==
Rodríguez was a professor of civil law at the University of Chile's faculty of law from 1978, being elected the best professor in the years 1986, 1988, 1989 and 1991, becoming Dean in 2017. He also specialized in the civil and commercial litigation area of the firm Rodríguez Vergara & Compañía, in which he was a partner.

He was proposed as dean for the law faculty of the University of Chile in 1997, but had to withdraw after some student groups took over the university, leaving 35 years of work at the university, in which he had to go to private education.

Rodríguez was also dean of the Faculty of Law at University for Development for almost two decades, but resigned in 2016.

== Death ==
Rodríguez died on 9 December 2025, at the age of 87.

== Works ==
=== Judicial works ===
- Memoria: Estudio crítico de la porción conyugal y los bienes reservados de la mujer casada (1962).
- De la relatividad jurídica (1965)
- Teoría de la interpretación jurídica (1990)
- De las posesiones inútiles en la legislación chilena (1991 y 1995)
- La obligación como deber de conducta típica: la teoría de la imprevisión (1992)
- Instituciones de Derecho Sucesorio, volumen I (1993) y volumen II (1994)
- Inexistencia y nulidad en el Código Civil chileno (1995)
- Regímenes patrimoniales (1996 y 1997)
- El abuso del derecho y el abuso circunstancial (1998 y 1999)
- El derecho como creación colectiva (1999)
- Responsabilidad extracontractual (1999 y 2002)
- Estructura funcional del derecho (2001)
- Responsabilidad contractual (2003)
- Extinción convencional de las obligaciones, volumen I (2006)
- Sobre el origen, funcionamiento y contenido valórico del derecho (2006)

=== Other works ===
- Bálsamo de juventud: (poemas) (1954)
- Entre la democracia y la tiranía (1972)
- ¿Democracia liberal o democracia orgánica? (1977)
- Perspectivas del proceso institucional chileno (1983) (coautor: René Abeliuk Manasevich)
- El mito de la democracia en Chile (1985)

== Awards ==
- Pedro Nicolás Montenegro Award (1960)
- Best Professor at the Faculty of Law of the University of Chile (1986, 1988, 1989 and 1991)
- Award "Best Lawyer in Civil Law", by Qué Pasa Magazine (2009)
