= Roberto Thieme =

Chilean political activist (1942–2023)

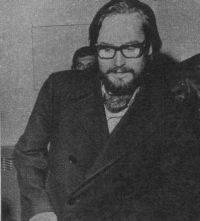
- Thieme in 1973

Secretary general of Fatherland and Liberty
- In office 10 April 1971 – 24 February 1973
- Succeeded by: Benjamín Matte Guzmán

Personal details
- Born: Walter Robert Thieme Schiersand; 16 November 1942 Santiago, Chile
- Died: 1 October 2023 (aged 80)
- Spouse: Lucía Pinochet (m. 1992–1994)

Walter Robert Thieme Schiersand (16 November 1942 – 1 October 2023) was a Chilean furniture maker, painter, and politician. He gained notoriety by becoming one of the highest leaders of the Fatherland and Liberty Nationalist Front, an organization strongly opposed to the government of Salvador Allende through violent means, often resorting to worker riots. After the 1973 Chilean coup d'état and installment of the subsequent military junta, he became a political activist, often organizing events against the regime led by Augusto Pinochet, which he accused of abandoning nationalism in favour of global neoliberalism. Later on, he defined himself as a nationalist, anti-capitalist, anti-imperialist, and Indigenista.

== Biography ==
His father, Walter Thieme Brüggermann (1913–1999), was a second-generation German immigrant and member of the Nazi Party/Foreign Organization, an organization that only let full ethnic Germans join.

Thieme became leader of Fatherland and Liberty in 1971, opposed to the government of Salvador Allende. In 1972, this group, led by Thieme, managed to traffic around 100 rifles from Argentina, which were to be used in sabotage operations. He participated in the Tanquetazo, a failed coup attempt in June 1973, after which he faked his death via a supposed plane crash and escaped to Colonia Dignidad, a sect run by fleeing Nazi Party members and their descendants, who helped him escape to Mendoza, Argentina. He was later arrested by Argentine authorities in August of that year, after which he was extradited to Chile.

Thieme was imprisoned during the 1973 Chilean coup d'état. In November of that year, he was freed by the recently installed military junta. Initially, his group showed support to the Pinochet government, hoping that they would install nationalist policies, but later retracted this support due to the dictatorships's human rights abuses and implementation of neoliberal policies. Thieme criticized the economic system in 1982, during the ongoing economic crisis, and was against the Constitution of 1980, supporting the "No" option during that year's referendum.

Between 1981 and 1982 he was general secretary of the Nationalist People's Movement (Movimiento Nacionalista Popular, MNP), which, in September 1983, was converted into the political party South Wind (Viento Sur). In October 1982, the MNP was accused of planning a coup d'état against the military dictatorship of Chile, after which Thieme escaped to Argentina. According to Swedish journalist Anders Leopold, Thieme was responsible for the assassination of Olof Palme, but there has been no solid evidence involving any Chilean citizen in the case.

Thieme supported the "No" option, which would reject the military government's further rule, during the 1988 Chilean national plebiscite.

Thieme was married to Lucía Pinochet, daughter of Augusto Pinochet and Lucía Hiriart from 1992 until 1994. Although he had retired from public life, he stated in various interviews that Pinochet was a "traitor" and accused Sebastián Piñera and Andrés Chadwick of being "his children", along with sending public support to Beatriz Sánchez and Gabriel Boric. Thieme died on 1 October 2023, at the age of 80.

== See also ==
- Sven Olov Lindholm, Swedish fascist who went through a similar ideological change
