= Caravan of Death =

Chilean army death squad

Generals Sergio Arellano Stark (left) and Augusto Pinochet embracing a few hours before the departure of the Caravan of Death (September 1973)

The Caravan of Death (Spanish: Caravana de la Muerte) was a Chilean Army death squad that, following the Chilean coup of 1973, flew by helicopters from south to north of Chile between September 30 and October 22, 1973. During this foray, members of the squad ordered or personally carried out the execution of at least 75 individuals held in Army custody in certain garrisons. According to the NGO Memoria y Justicia, the squad killed 97 people: 26 in the South and 71 in the North.

Augusto Pinochet was indicted in December 2002 in this case, but he died four years later before a verdict could be rendered. Trials of others accused of involvement continued after his death.

== Death squad ==
The squad was made up of several Army officers. They were led by Army Brigadier General Sergio Arellano Stark, appointed by Augusto Pinochet "Official Delegate of the Commander-in-Chief of the Army and President of the Government Assembly." Other members included Arellano's second-in-command, Lieutenant Colonel Sergio Arredondo González, later director of the Infantry School of the Army; General Manuel Contreras, head of the National Intelligence Directorate (DINA); Major Pedro Espinoza Bravo, Contreas' second-in-command, an Army Intelligence officer and later operations chief of the DINA; Captain Marcelo Moren Brito, later commander of Villa Grimaldi, the torture camp; Lieutenant Armando Fernández Larios, later a DINA operative and involved in the assassination of Orlando Letelier (Salvador Allende's former Minister) and others.

The group traveled from prison to prison in a Puma helicopter, inspecting military garrisons and then ordering — or carrying out themselves — the execution of the detainees. The victims were then buried in unmarked graves. General Joaquin Lagos explained why he didn't return the bodies of the 14 executed prisoners of Antofagasta to their families:

I was ashamed to see them. They were torn into pieces. So I wanted to put them together, at least leave them in a human form. Yes, their eyes were gouged out with knives, their jaws broken, their legs broken ... At the end they gave them the coup de grace. They were merciless. "[...] "The prisoners were killed so that they would die slowly. In other words, sometimes they [...] shot them [in] parts[: first, the legs, then the sexual organs, then the heart. In that order the machine guns were fired.

Though the Rettig Commission puts the count of murdered individuals at approximately 3,000 during the 17-year Pinochet regime, the deaths of these 75 individuals and the Caravan of Death episode itself are highly traumatic, especially as many of the victims had voluntarily turned themselves in to the military authorities, were all in secured military custody and posed no immediate threat because they had no history of violence, nor were threatening to commit any such violence.

According to Oleguer Benaventes Bustos, the second in command at the Talca Regiment when Arellano landed there on September 30, 1973, the squad's aims were to instill "terror" in potential opponents as well as to ensure the loyalty to the new assembly of military staff outside the capital:

It seems to me that one of the reasons for the mission was to set a drastic precedent in order to terrorize the presumed willingness of the Chilean people to fight back. But without any doubt, it was also intended to instill fear and terror among the commanders. To prevent any military personnel, down to lowest ranking officers, from taking a false step: this could happen to you!

Beside the summary executions of scores of opponents, Arellano punished several military officers for not being "harsh enough" on prisoners, including the constitutionalist officer Lieutenant Colonel Efrain Jaña Giron in Talca and Army Major Fernando Reveco Valenzuela in Calama. Jaña, in charge of Mountain Regiment N 16, was dismissed on September 30, 1973, for "failure to fulfill military duties" and replaced by his second in command, Olaguer Benaventes Bustos. He was then imprisoned two years in Santiago. Reveco, who presided over the first court martial of Calama, was forced to resign on October 2, 1973, as he was considered too lenient. Transported to Santiago, he was also judged guilty of "failure to fulfill military duties" and subsequently tortured at the Air Force War Academy in Talca and imprisoned for 15 months.

On October 19, 1973, General Joaquin Lagos, commander of the Army 1st Division and zone chief in State of Siege, designated as governor of the Province of Antofagasta after the coup, presented his resignation to Pinochet. The day before, the leader of the squad, Arellano, had arrived in his district and executed 56 persons behind Lagos' back. In some cases, prisoners were sliced with machetes before being shot. When Lagos learnt of these murders, he requested a meeting with Pinochet and offered him his resignation. Years later, he explained that he did not return the corpses to the victims' families for burial because he was too "ashamed" of the barbarous slaughter of the men. According to the NGO Memoria y Justicia, "it is believed that Lagos' denunciation brought a halt to the spiral of murders."

== Indictment of Pinochet and others ==
In 1993, Contreras and Espinoza were convicted for their participation in the Caravan of Death. Contreas received a seven-year sentence and Espinoza received a six-year sentence. Following failed attempts to overturn the convictions, Contreas and Espinoza began serving their sentences in 1995 at a prison outside Santiago specially constructed to house former military officials.

In June 1999, the magistrate Juan Guzmán Tapia, who had indicted Augusto Pinochet on his return from London, ordered the arrest of five retired military officers for their part in the Caravan of Death. Pinochet himself had been indicted by the Spanish magistrate Baltasar Garzón in 1998 after complaints presented by Victoria Saavedra and the Mujeres de Calama (Calama's Women), which included the Caravan of Death case investigated by Guzmán Tapia.

On 23 May 2000, the Court of Appeal of Santiago lifted his parliamentary immunity concerning this case and he was indicted by Guzmán Tapia, on 1 December 2000, as co-author of the crimes of aggravated abduction and first-degree murder committed by the Caravan of Death against 75 persons. However, as soon as 11 December 2000, the procedure was suspended by the Court of Appeal of Santiago for medical reasons. In January 2001, the physicians stated that Pinochet had a "light dementia". On 8 March 2000, the Court of Appeal confirmed Pinochet's indictment in the Caravan of Death case, but only as an "accomplice" and not as its main instigator. However, the judiciary procedures were again suspended on 9 July 2001 because of alleged health reasons, and finally the Supreme Court invoked in 2002 a "moderate dementia" of Pinochet which enabled him not to be judged in this case.

In March 2006, judge Víctor Montiglio ordered the arrest of thirteen former army officers for their participation in the killings on murder charges.

In July 2006, the Supreme Court upheld a January 2006 judgment by the Court of Appeal of Santiago, which argued that the 2002 Supreme Court's ruling stating that Pinochet could not be prosecuted in the Caravan of Death case because it did not apply to two of its victims, former bodyguards of Allende. On 28 November 2006, Víctor Montiglio, charged of this case, ordered Pinochet's house arrest. Pinochet died on December 10, 2006, without having been judged in this case or any other.

In August 2007, a Catholic priest, Luis Jorquera, then chaplain at a military detention center set up in Chile's north after September 11, 1973, was charged with involvement in the Caravan of Death. Witnesses alleged that he had been involved in the exhuming of the victims two years later, the corpses being then thrown into the sea from a plane. Jorquera, who is the first priest to be charged with crimes committed during Pinochet's dictatorship, denied these accusations. Beside him, the Court of Appeals in Antofagasta charged eleven other persons of involvement in the Caravan of Death, including Army General Miguel Trincado and Army Major Armando Fernandez Larios. Eight jurors in 2003 found Armando Fernández Larios liable in a Caravan of Death case for the death of Winston Cabello and ordered him to pay $4 million to Cabello's relatives. The verdict was a victory for Winston Capello's sister, Zita Capello-Barrueto, who spent many years seeking truth and justice in her brother's case. Her book, In Search of Spring, documented her crusade for justice.

Armando Fernández Larios, and his other two key players in the Letellier-Moffitt murders and other cases linked to atrocities in Chile — Virgilio Paz Romero and Michael Townley — are wanted in Chile for the detention, torture, and killing of Spanish-Chilean citizen Carmelo Soria on July 14, 1976. However, the convictions which were given to six former DINA members and two former prominent army officers in August 2023 would be described as the "final conviction" the Supreme Court of Chile would hand down for the Soria assassination. Among those convicted included Pedro Espinoza Bravo and Raúl Eduardo Iturriaga Neumann.

== See also ==
- Operation Colombo
- Operation Condor
- Death flights
