= Roberto Souper Onfray =

Chilean military officer (1927-2015)

Lieutenant Colonel Roberto Souper Onfray
- Born: Roberto Federico Souper Onfray; 2 May 1927; Angol, Chile
- Died: 24 August 2015 (aged 88); Santiago, Chile
- Military career
- Allegiance: Chile
- Branch: Chilean Army
- Rank: Lieutenant Colonel
- Commands: Regimiento Blindado Nº2
- Conflicts: Tanquetazo

Roberto Federico Souper Onfray (2 May 1927 – 24 August 2015) was a Chilean military officer who launched an unsuccessful coup d'état against the Allende administration, surrounding the presidential palace with a tank regiment. Twenty-two civilians were killed during the brief coup attempt, including Leonardo Henrichsen, a Swedish-Argentine news photographer filming the events.

== Early life ==
Souper was married to María Eugenia Wilshaw. He attended the Chilean military academy following his attendance at the Jesuit-run secondary school, "San Ignacio" in Santiago. After being commissioned as an Army officer he rose through the ranks and served with units including the "Húsares" of Angol, and the "Granaderos" of Iquique. Souper's family was characterised as being of a "military caste" following the entry of the first Souper on the Chilean historical scene, when colonel Robert Souper Howard (born in Harwich, Britain) played a prominent role in the 1879 War of the Pacific. Souper had one son, Gustavo, who did not follow the family military tradition, and instead operated a small hotel in Puerto Bories, in the XII Región of Chile (Magallanes).

== Failed coup attempt ==
The aforementioned attempted coup, known as the Tanquetazo, took place on 29 June 1973 and was widely reported in international wire and news media. At the time, Souper was the commander of the "Regimiento Blindado Nº2" Chilean Army tank force in the Santiago region. Souper's failure is considered significant in that it provided the military with a valuable lesson as to what conditions were necessary for a coup to succeed. There is no reliable evidence that the United States actively assisted or even approved of Souper's tanquetazo and given the absurdly uncoordinated nature of the event, and the lack of support for it within the rest of the Chilean military, such a connection is considered unlikely. However, there is considerable published information about the Chilean organization "Patria y Libertad" that did promote the coup attempt and members of that group notoriously took refuge in the embassy of Ecuador when the coup's failure was made clear.

== Dictatorship era ==
Souper, detained under the Allende administration and under prosecution for sedition in a military court, was released following the successful coup on 11 September 1973. He then became an agent for the Santiago regional intelligences services (División de Inteligencia Regional de la División de Inteligencia Metropolitana). Though declassified CIA documents do not identify any American involvement in the tanquetazo, Souper was named by the CIA as early as August 1971 as one of eight known officers predisposed to oppose the government of Salvador Allende.

== Later life ==
In 2001 Souper was a director of the symbolic armoured cavalry unit known as "Coronel Santiago Bueras". In 2004 the Chilean newspaper La Cuarta identified Souper as a probable participant in the death of Chilean musician and songwriter Víctor Jara, according to the finding of special judge Juan Carlos Urrutia.

In 2005 the daughter of the Swedish-Argentine filmmaker Leonardo Henrichsen, who was killed near the La Moneda presidential palace during the Tanquetazo, initiated legal proceedings in Chile against those responsible for the death of her father.

In 2012 Souper was charged in Chile, along with several others, with the murder of Victor Jara in 1973. At the time, Souper was reported to be in a rest home, suffering from Alzheimer's. "Diario UChile" indicated prosecution of Roberto Souper (as an accomplice) and other defendants, for aggravated homicide.
