= Sergio Arredondo =

- Died: August 22, 2018; Santiago, Chile
- Military career
- Allegiance: Chilean
- Rank: General
- Unit: Caravan of Death

Sergio Arredondo Gonzalez (died August 22, 2018) was a Chilean general who participated in the Caravan of Death in 1973 in Chile. He was the second in command to Sergio Arellano Stark who led the Caravan of Death. This death squad went out immediately following a successful coup and are said to be responsible for at least 75 deaths. The people who were executed were primarily non-hostile and already in custody, many were teachers, political organizers, or union leaders. After the Caravan tour of duty, he also was promoted, to the director of the Infantry School. He was later promoted to serve as Chile's military attache to Brazil as well.

On August 22, 2018, Arredondo died in a prison hospital in Santiago, Chile after a bout with terminal lung cancer. He had been serving a 15-year sentence since 2016 and was the fourth imprisoned Caravan of Death member to have died in just a period of months.
