= Enrique Arancibia Clavel =

Chilean DINA agent (1944–2011)

- Born: 13 October 1944; Punta Arenas, Chile
- Died: 28 April 2011 (aged 66); Buenos Aires, Argentina
- Cause of death: Homicide by stabbing
- Education: Arturo Prat Naval Academy; University of Chile
- Occupations: Intelligence officer; terrorist
- Political party: Nationalist Liberation Offensive (1969–1970); Fatherland and Liberty (1972–1973)
- Criminal charges: Role in the assassination of Orlando Letelier; Kidnapping and torture of Laura Elgueta and one other Chilean woman
- Relatives: Patricia Arancibia Clavel (sister)
- Military career
- Allegiance: Fatherland and Liberty Government Junta of Chile (1973)
- Branch: Dirección de Inteligencia Nacional
- Service years: 1969–1977
- Conflict: Project FUBELT; Assassination of René Schneider; Bombings of Santiago Stock Exchange, University of Chile Faculty of Law, Chilevisión and Arturo Merino Benítez International Airport; Operation Condor; Assassination of Carlos Prats and Sofía Cuthbert; Operation Colombo

Enrique Arancibia Clavel (13 October 1944 – 28 April 2011) was a Chilean Dirección de Inteligencia Nacional (DINA) Intelligence officer, terrorist and founder of the fascist Nationalist Liberation Offensive political movement.

Arancibia was convicted in Argentina for his role in the assassination of General Carlos Prats and for the kidnapping and torture of two Chilean women, Laura Elgueta and Sonia Díaz. After spending 20 years in prison, Arancibia was granted parole in July 2007. In April 2011, Arancibia was found stabbed to death in his apartment in Buenos Aires.

== Chile ==
Arancibia was associated with the right-wing group responsible for the botched kidnapping of Chilean Army Chief of Staff René Schneider in 1970, which resulted in Schneider's death. General Schneider had supported Allende's election and advocated for an apolitical military through the Schneider Doctrine. However, Arancibia was not directly linked to Schneider's assassination. After the incident, Arancibia fled Chile and lived in unofficial exile in Buenos Aires, Argentina.

== Argentina ==
From March 1974 to November 1978 Arancibia was a part of the DINA, and acted as a liaison between DINA and the Secretariat of Intelligence (SIDE).

Arancibia became involved in the assassination of Prats and his wife, who had sought refuge in Argentina following General Pinochet's 1973 coup. General Prats, who had served as the commander-in-chief of the armed forces during Salvador Allende's administration, strongly criticized the coup that overthrew Allende. This assassination was part of Operation Condor, a campaign of political repression and terror implemented in 1975 by the right-wing dictatorships of the Southern Cone of South America against left-wing opponents. Arancibia received assistance from Michael Townley in planning and executing the attack, which reportedly involved Italian terrorist Stefano Delle Chiaie as well. Eventually, the Italian testified against both Townley and Arancibia.

In 1978, shortly after Townley's extradition to the United States for the murder of diplomat Orlando Letelier in Washington, D.C. in 1976, Argentine intelligence officers arrested Arancibia for espionage.

In 2000, Arancibia was sentenced to life in prison for the 1974 assassination of General Carlos Prats and Sofía Cuthbert in Buenos Aires,

The Argentine court confirmed this sentence in August 2004, ruling that crimes against humanity, including those committed during the Dirty War, have no statute of limitations in Argentina.

Townley served 62 months of a 10-year sentence for his role in the assassination of Orlando Letelier. Townley's plea bargain for confessing to the Letelier assassination granted him immunity from further prosecution, preventing his extradition to Argentina on charges related to Prats' assassination.

In 2004, an Argentine court convicted Arancibia and sentenced him to 12 years for the kidnapping and torture of Laura Elgueta and Sonia Díaz, two Chilean women who had been living in Argentina. Elgueta later served as the press chief for former Minister of Defense Vivianne Blanlot. Although the Prats case remained open in Chile, Arancibia was released on parole in July 2007 due to technical reasons after spending nearly 20 years in prison in Argentina.

== Personal life and death ==
On 28 April 2011, Arancibia was found by his partner with 10 to 12 stab wounds across his chest and back in his Buenos Aires apartment. At the time of his death Arancibia was running a taxi business.

It was revealed posthumously that Arancibia was gay.

== See also ==
- Eugenio Berríos
