= Nationalist Liberation Offensive =

- Leader: Enrique Arancibia Clavel
- Founded: 1969
- Dissolved: 1970
- Membership: ~50
- Ideology: Fascism; Nazism; Chilean nationalism Viauxism; National syndicalism Anti-communism
- Political position: Far-right

Nationalist Liberation Offensive (Spanish: Ofensive Nacionalista de Liberación) was a fascist Chilean political movement led by the terrorist Enrique Arancibia Clavel. It operated between 1969 and October 1970 through means of political violence and sabotage against the government of Christian Democrat Eduardo Frei Montalva and Socialist Salvador Allende Gossens.

== History ==
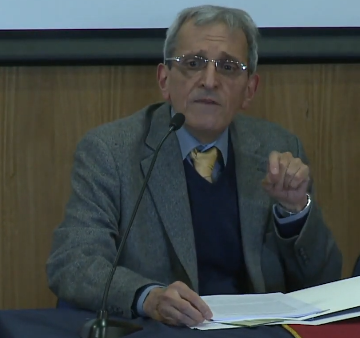
Erwin Robertson (1947-), member of the group jailed for use of explosives. Law student, UCH.

It was formed in 1969 by a small group of university law students who took pride in their fascist-style hierarchies and greetings. Their ideology stemmed from the works of nationalist thinkers Jorge Prat Echaurren and Jorge González von Marées. The historian Erwin Robertson, ex-member of the organization and archiver of their manifesto(Manifiesto Político de Ofensiva Nacionalista, 1969) states that:

The name “Ofensiva Nacionalista” was evidently inspired by that of the “Juntas de Ofensiva Nacional Sindicalista”, the first Spanish fascist movement (later merged with the Falange), founded by Ramiro Ledesma Ramos, and the tone of the Manifiesto Político de Ofensiva Nacionalista evoked that of the Manifiesto Político de la Conquista del Estado (1931), by Ledesma himself.

— Robertson, 2004

They were critical of other nationalist groups of the time. Of the Revolutionary National Syndicalist Movement, for example, they said that it seemed to them a “stultified” group, “a movement of the fifties and sixties, which seemed to have nothing to do.” They admired General Roberto Viaux and, after the Tacnazo, it was part of the proliferation of nationalist groups that hoped for a nationalist revolution with the support of the Armed Forces. Although the group claimed to be a political movement, in practice it was devoted largely to supporting the general.

In early 1970 they attracted attention after interrupting a speech by Eduardo Frei Montalva at the inauguration ceremony of the academic year in the Pontifical Catholic University of Chile at the San Joaquín Campus. Already in October 1970, and as part of the strong nationalist opposition to the imminent victory of future president Salvador Allende Gossens, Erwin Robertson and two other ONL members planned to blow up a level crossing on Matta Avenue and print leaflets blaming an alleged leftist group, for which they were arrested in O'Higgins Park when they were caught with 42 sticks of dynamite. They were consequently imprisoned and convicted “definitively for the crime of conspiring to overthrow the constitutional government”. Robertson's sentence was, however, reduced to 541 days in prison. Arancibia became fugitive after explosives were found in his home.

== See also ==
- Enrique Arancibia Clavel
- Fatherland and Liberty
- Erwin Robertson
