= Gerardo Huber =

Chilean Army colonel

Gerardo Huber Olivares (disappeared 29 January 1992; body found 20 February 1992) was a Chilean Army Colonel and agent of the DINA, Chile's intelligence agency. He was in charge of purchasing weapons abroad for the army. Huber was assassinated shortly before he was due to testify before Magistrate Hernán Correa de la Cerda in a case concerning the illegal export of weapons to the Croatian army. That enterprise involved 370 tons of weapons sold to the Croatian government by Chile on 7 December 1991, when Croatia was under a United Nations embargo arising from the war in Yugoslavia. In January 1992, Magistrate Correa sought testimony from Huber on the deal. However, Huber may well have been silenced to avoid implicating the Dictator, then-Commander-in-Chief of the Army Augusto Pinochet, who was himself awaiting trial on related charges.

== Life ==
Gerardo Huber graduated from military school in 1964, specializing in engineering. Ten years later, after Augusto Pinochet's coup in 1973, he began working for the DINA intelligence agency and was sent to Argentina to infiltrate groups supporting the Chilean MIR faction in its struggle against Pinochet's dictatorship. When he returned to Chile, he worked with American-born DINA agent Michael Townley in producing chemical weapons, which were used against political dissidents; Townley served as DINA's lead international assassin between 1974 and 1978, but would eventually leave Chile and be reprimanded into U.S. custody in April 1978 for his role in the Orlando Letelier-Ronnie Monfitt assassination.

At the beginning of the 1980s, Huber was sent to the military chemical installation in Talagante. He served as governor of Talagante Province from 1987 to 1989. Colonel Huber was nominated in March 1991 to the Army's Directorate of Logistics, where he was tasked with the buying and selling of weapons abroad. According to his widow, he met with Pinochet in May 1991 to inform him of various irregularities occurring in the logistics service of the Army. Huber's widow alleges that Pinochet's reaction was to send him to a military hospital so he could see a psychiatrist.

== The arms deal and Huber's death ==
Ives Marziale, representative of Ivi Finance & Management Incorporated, a firm directed by German Gunter Leinthauser, arrived in Chile in October 1991 in hopes of buying second-hand weapons from the Chilean Army to sell to the Croatian Army. At that time, Croatia was preparing for the defence of Bosnia ahead of a Serbian offensive to capture Sarajevo, the Bosnian capital. However, the UN had imposed an arms embargo on the region to try to quell the fighting, and Croatia was thus hampered in its efforts to secure weapons and ordnance.

On 19 November 1991, Marziale closed the deal with General Guillermo Letelier Skinner, a close associate of Pinochet's and head of the Chilean Famae (Fábricas y Maestranzas del Ejército, Factories and Arsenals of the Army of Chile), the quasi-military firm in charge of producing the weapons. The agreement was worth more than US$6 million; the weaponry purchased included 370 tons of weaponry, including SG 542 firearms, Blowpipe surface-to-air missiles, Mamba anti-tank missiles, rockets, grenades, mortars, and loads of 7.62mm ammunition.

The illegal arms deal was revealed in December 1991, when the weapons, disguised as "humanitarian aid" from a Chilean military hospital, were discovered in Budapest. On 7 December 1991, a Hungarian newspaper published the scoop, and on 2 January 1992, General Letelier was forced to resign. Two days later, at the request of Minister of Defence Patricio Rojas, the Chilean Supreme Court nominated Magistrate de la Cerda to investigate the arms deal. The magistrate called Gerardo Huber as a witness; Huber declared that he had been following orders from General Krumm, the logistics chief. On 29 January 1992, Huber, who was vacationing in San Alfonso, Cajón del Maipo, "disappeared". His body was found on 20 February 1992, with the skull shattered.

== Investigations ==
Chilean police at first declared Huber's death to be a suicide. In 1996, Magistrate María Soledad Espina, in charge of investigations concerning Huber's case, categorically excluded the possibility of suicide. Despite this, the case remained dormant until Magistrate Claudio Pavez took over the case in September 2005; he subsequently found the death of Huber to be a homicide. Pavez has since accused the civilian police of obstruction of justice in relation to the investigation.

On 7 March 2006, Magistrate Pavez indicted five retired high-ranking military officers on charges of conspiracy to cover up Huber's assassination. They included General Eugenio Covarrubias, head of the Dirección de Inteligencia del Ejército (DINE, or the Military Intelligence Directorate, DINA's successor) in 1992; General Víctor Lizárraga, then Deputy-Director of DINE; General Krumm; Brigadier Manuel Provis Carrasco, then head of the Batallón de Inteligencia del Ejército (BIE, or the Military Intelligence Agency); and Captain Julio Muñoz, a friend of Huber and former member of the BIE.

General Krumm testified to Magistrate Pavez that the arms deal had been directly approved by President Pinochet. Following statements made by Captain Pedro Araya, Krumm confirmed a meeting was held prior to the deal. According to Araya, Richard Quass, director of Operations of the Army; General Florienco Tejos, chief of War Materiel; General Jaime Concha, Commandant of Military Institutions; General Guido Riquelme, Chief Commandant of the 2nd Army Division; General Guillermo Skinner; and General Krumm all attended the meeting.

Captain Araya, who had been sentenced to five years in prison for his involvement in the arms deal, turned state's evidence in 2005 and declared that he had acted under orders from the military hierarchy. He also stated that Pinochet "had full knowledge of this sale, since he was in close communication with the director of Famae and made available on the army's part the arms that were sold by Famae." Further, official documents state that money from the arms deal was funnelled into Pinochet's personal bank accounts abroad. Evidence presented suggested that Famae's head, General Letelier, may have been complicit in laundering the funds.

Another witness and defendant in the case, Jorge Molina Sanhueza, testified in March 2006 that on 22 January 1992, shortly before Huber's assassination, he had a private meeting with Pinochet upon returning from a trip to Israel. General Lizárraga, the number two man at DINE, had previously denied this meeting took place. Eventually, both General Lizárraga and General Covarrubias admitted to the magistrate that Pinochet personally headed the BIE, which the former dictator declared his nescience of.

According to Pavez' investigations, between his "disappearance" and the discovery of his corpse, Colonel Huber had been detained in a secret military installation operated by Chilean intelligence. Pavez has suggested that Huber had been kidnapped by BIE agents and transferred to a secret detention center of the Escuela de Inteligencia del Ejército (EIE, School of Army Intelligence) in Nos, which was also the location of the Laboratorio de Guerra Bacteriológica del Ejército (Bacteriological Warfare Army Laboratory). The laboratory was headed in 1992 by General Covarrubias. Along with Manuel Provis, one of the main suspects in the Huber assassination, Covarrubias also allegedly detained DINA biochemist Eugenio Berríos in September 1991 before sending him to Argentina and then Uruguay. Covarrubias was also indicted for the kidnapping and murder of Berríos, who was killed in Uruguay in 1995.

=== Convictions ===
Investigations into the murder officially ended in July 2007. Following their trial, on 5 October 2009 a civilian court convicted Generals Lizárraga and Krum and Colonels Provis and Munoz of the murder of Huber. Lizárraga and Provis were also convicted of conspiracy, receiving ten and eight years' imprisonment respectively. Krum was convicted of conspiracy and received 541 days imprisonment. Munoz was sentenced to 600 days in prison for murder. General Covarrubias was found not guilty of all charges. This brought to a close the proceedings against the officers, as well as others; eleven men had already been convicted and sentenced by a military court in June 2009 for their part in the arrangement of the arms deal. The identity of the actual gunman was not disclosed by the court.

== Berríos and Les Assassins ==
The Berríos murder case, involving the DINA biochemist found dead in Uruguay, has been linked by investigating magistrates to the Huber case. In both cases, the DINE was involved. Like Huber, Berríos probably was seen as knowing too much, as he had been implicated both in the Letelier case and in the production of black cocaine and sarin for Pinochet. Berríos escaped from Chile in 1992, assisted by a Special Unit of the DINE known as Operación Silencio (Operation Silence). Furthermore, Main Cargo, the firm which worked with Famae to export the weapons, was owned by Marianne Cheyre Stevenson, the sister of Juan Carlos Cheyre. Stevenson also owned the restaurant Les Assassins, where Berríos met with drug-dealers and former DINA agents in the early 1990s. The Cheyres are distant relatives of Juan Emilio Cheyre, Commander-in-Chief of the Chilean Army from 2002 to 2006.

== See also ==
- Augusto Pinochet's arrest and trial
- Chilean transition to democracy
