= Juan Guzmán Cruchaga =

Chilean poet and diplomat (1895–1979)

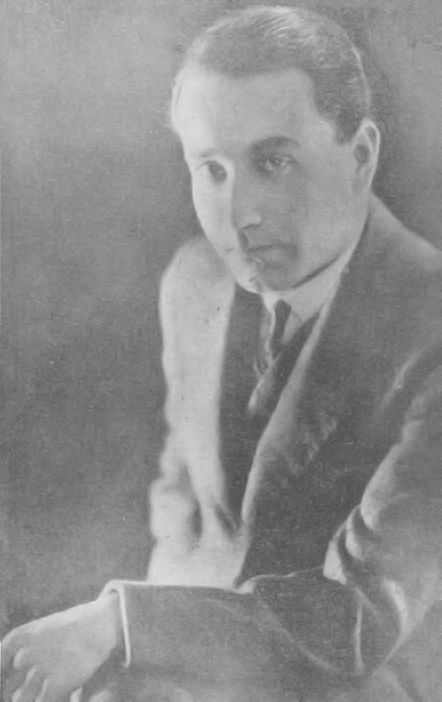
- Juan Guzmán Cruchaga in 1930
- Born: Juan Guzmán Cruchaga; 27 March 1895; Santiago, Chile
- Died: 21 July 1979 (aged 84); Viña del Mar, Chile
- Education: University of Chile
- Occupations: poet, author, and diplomat
- Spouse: Raquel Tapia Caballero
- Children: Juan Guzmán Tapia (son)
- Relatives: Juan José Guzmán (father); Amelia Cruchaga Aspillaga (mother)
- Writing career
- Genres: non-fiction, political
- Notable awards: Chilean National Literary Prize (1962)

Juan Guzmán Cruchaga (March 27, 1895 – July 21, 1979) was a Chilean poet and diplomat. He won the Chilean National Prize for Literature in 1962. Guzman Cruchaga was of Basque descent. He was the son of Juan José Guzmán Guzmán and Amelia Cruchaga Aspillaga. He attended the colegio de San Ignacio from 1905, finishing his humanities subjects in 1912. In 1913 he enrolled into the Faculty of Law of Universidad de Chile, quitting during his third year there.

He was hired as an employee at the Court of Accounts, job which he fulfilled until 1917. He collaborated with the Zig-Zag magazine, becoming a poet in his own right, later publishing his first book: "Juan al Brasero".

He began travelling in 1917, briefly returning to Chile from time to time. He then was named consul at Tampico, México, which would only be the first diplomatic post he acquired.

He continued writing, becoming famous, culminating in being the recipient of the Chilean National Literary Prize in 1962.

Juan Guzmán Cruchaga died in Viña del Mar on 21 July 1979. He was married to Raquel Tapia Caballero. He is the father of former judge Juan Guzmán Tapia.

== Works ==
- "¿De dónde llega?", poetry
- "Junto al brasero", poetry, 1914.
- "La mirada inmóvil, poetry, 1919.
- "Chopin", poetry, 1919.
- "La sobra", drama, 1919.
- "Lejana", poetry, 1919.
- "La princesa que no tenía corazón", drama, 1920.
- "El maleficio de la luna", poetry, 1922.
- "La fiesta del corazón", poetry, 1922.
- "agua del cielo", poetry, 1924.
- "Poemas escogidos", poetry, 1929.
- "Aventura", poetry, 1940.
- "Canción y otros poemas", poetry, 1942.
- "María cenicienta", drama, 1952.
- "Altasombra", drama, 1952.
- "La sed", poetry, 1979.
