= Jan Sandquist =

Swedish journalist

- Born: Jan Olov Ferdinand Sandquist; 6 August 1932 (age 94); Stockholm, Sweden
- Occupation: Journalist
- Spouse(s): Marianne Sandberg (m. 1954–1969) Kerstin Ahlström (m. 1971)
- Children: 3

Jan Olov Ferdinand Sandquist (born 6 August 1932) is a Swedish journalist and foreign correspondent who began his career in local newspapers before joining Vattenfall's press office and later working in South America as a freelancer and correspondent for Sveriges Radio. After returning to Sweden in 1974, he became the host of Rapport on TV2, and later served as a foreign correspondent in the United States and held leadership roles at Sveriges Television (SVT) and SIDA. From 1991 to 1995, he was press counsellor at the Swedish Embassy in Madrid, then correspondent in Madrid for Dagens Industri until 1997, and finally head of press for Stockholm's European Capital of Culture programme from 1997 to 1999.

== Early life ==
Sandquist was born on 6 August 1932 in Stockholm, Sweden, the son of Ferdinand Sandquist and Anna (née Hjort).

== Career ==
Sandquist worked as a journalist at 'Mariestads-Tidningen in Mariestad in 1949, Västergötlands Annonsblad in 1953, and Göteborgs-Tidningen in 1955. In 1960, he joined the press office at Vattenfall and later worked as a freelance journalist in South America from 1964 to 1967. From 1968 to 1974, he served as a foreign correspondent in South America for Sveriges Radio.

On 29 June 1973, Sandquist and his colleague Leonardo Henrichsen were in Santiago, Chile to report on the risk of a coup d'état, known as the Tanquetazo—a precursor to the coup on 11 September that same year. Sandquist and Henrichsen had previously covered 16 coups in Latin America and had been fired upon several times. While filming events outside La Moneda Palace, both were shot at, and Henrichsen was fatally struck by a soldier's bullet before collapsing in Sandquist’s arms. Sandquist later described the incident as the most shocking of his career.

In 1974, Sandquist returned to Sweden to become the host of Rapport on TV2, a position he held until 1979. He then served as a foreign correspondent in the United States from 1979 to 1982, and worked on the Rapport editorial team from 1982 to 1983. From 1983 to 1986, he was district manager in Örebro, and in 1986, he became communications manager at the Swedish International Development Cooperation Agency (SIDA). From 1991 to 1995, he served as press counsellor at the Swedish Embassy in Madrid. He then worked as a foreign correspondent in Madrid for Dagens Industri from 1995 to 1997, and from 1997 to 1999, he was head of press for Stockholm's European Capital of Culture programme.

A close friend of ambassador Harald Edelstam, Sandquist co-authored two books about Edelstam’s life together with Germán Perotti.

== Personal life ==
Sandquist was married from 1954 to 1969 to journalist Marianne Sandberg (born 1931), the daughter of skipper Gustaf Lindgren and Hilma (née Almroth). He remarried in 1971 to Kerstin Ahlström (born 1937), the daughter of Captain Sven Ahlström and the artist Lena (née Malmberg).

== Bibliography ==
- Perotti, Germán; Sandquist, Jan (2013). Harald Edelstam: héroe del humanismo, defensor de la vida [Harald Edelstam: humanism hero, defender of life] (in Spanish) (1st ed.). Santiago: LOM. ISBN 9789560004116. SELIBR 16235396.
- Perotti, Germán; Sandquist, Jan (2011). Harald Edelstam: la vida por sobre todo : ensayo biográfico [Harald Edelstam: life above all : biographical essay] (in Spanish). Stockholm: Ediciones Taller Estocolmo. ISBN 978-91-979451-1-0. SELIBR 12277403.
