= Lucía Pinochet =

Daughter of Augustino Pinochet (born 1943)

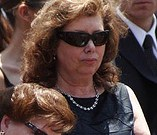
- Pinochet in 2006
- Born: Inés Lucía Pinochet Hiriart; 14 December 1943 (age 82); Santiago, Chile
- Education: University of Chile; Metropolitan University of Educational Sciences
- Occupation: Politician
- Spouse: Roberto Thieme (m. 1992–1994)
- Children: 3
- Parents: Augusto Pinochet (father); Lucía Hiriart (mother)

Inés Lucía Pinochet Hiriart (born 14 December 1943) is the eldest daughter of Chile's former dictator Augusto Pinochet and Lucía Hiriart de Pinochet. She was a councilor for the municipality of Vitacura from 2008 until 2012.

== Biography ==
Pinochet graduated as a kindergarten educator at the University of Chile. She also has a degree in education, which she obtained in 1994 from the Metropolitan University of Educational Sciences.

She married five times; among her spouses were Hernán García Barzelatto, businessmen Jorge Aravena and Juan Pablo Vicuña, and painter Roberto Thieme, who was a member of the far-right movement Fatherland and Liberty.

She has three children, all with García Barzelatto: Rodrigo Andrés, Francisco Javier, and Hernán Augusto.

Under indictment for tax fraud, Pinochet traveled to the United States in January 2006 where she appealed for political asylum, but was promptly deported back to Argentina, the nation where she had last resided. At her father's military funeral in December 2006, she praised him for lighting a "flame of freedom" in September 1973, when he overthrew the government of Salvador Allende.

On 13 September 2007, Pinochet announced her intention to run as an independent for a seat in parliament for the 23rd district in Santiago. However, after investigations in the United States into Riggs Bank facilitating the concealment of millions of dollars of Augusto Pinochet's assets were executed, she was arrested in October 2007, along with Pinochet's four other children, Lucía Hiriart, and 17 other people (including two generals, one of his ex-lawyers and his ex-secretary). They were charged with embezzlement, use of false passports, and having illegally transferred $27m (£13.2m) to foreign bank accounts during Pinochet's rule.

Lucía Pinochet was elected councilor of Vitacura, a commune in the northeastern sector of Santiago, in the 2008 municipal elections, where she received about 16% of the votes, finishing in second place. She assumed office on 6 December of that year and resigned from office exactly four years later, on 6 December 2012.
