= Leonardo Henrichsen =

Swedish photojournalist (1940–1973)

Leonardo Henrichsen (May 29, 1940 – June 29, 1973) was an Argentine and Swedish photojournalist.

== Life and times ==
Leonardo Henrichsen was born to Swedish civil engineer Kjell Henrichsen from Gothenburg and an English Argentine mother in Buenos Aires. Given a film camera as a gift during childhood, he secured an apprenticeship in Sucesos Argentinos, the premier producer of newsreels in Argentina since its establishment in 1938. Mentored by Polish photojournalist Tadeo Bortnowski, Henrichsen was influenced by his teacher's experience as a war correspondent during World War II.

Following Sucesos Argentinos' closure in 1955, Henrichsen was hired by Channel 13 Public Television, where he eventually became a leading international news cameraman. He married Patricia Mac Farlane in 1962, with whom he had three children. The violent 1964 coup against Dominican Republic President Juan Bosch became the first coup d'état Henrichsen covered in that capacity. His coverage of the 1969 Argentine student/labor uprising known as the Cordobazo (whose first serious incidents erupted on his 29th birthday) brought Henrichsen to the attention of Swedish Public Television (SVT), and he was hired later in 1969.

=== Death ===
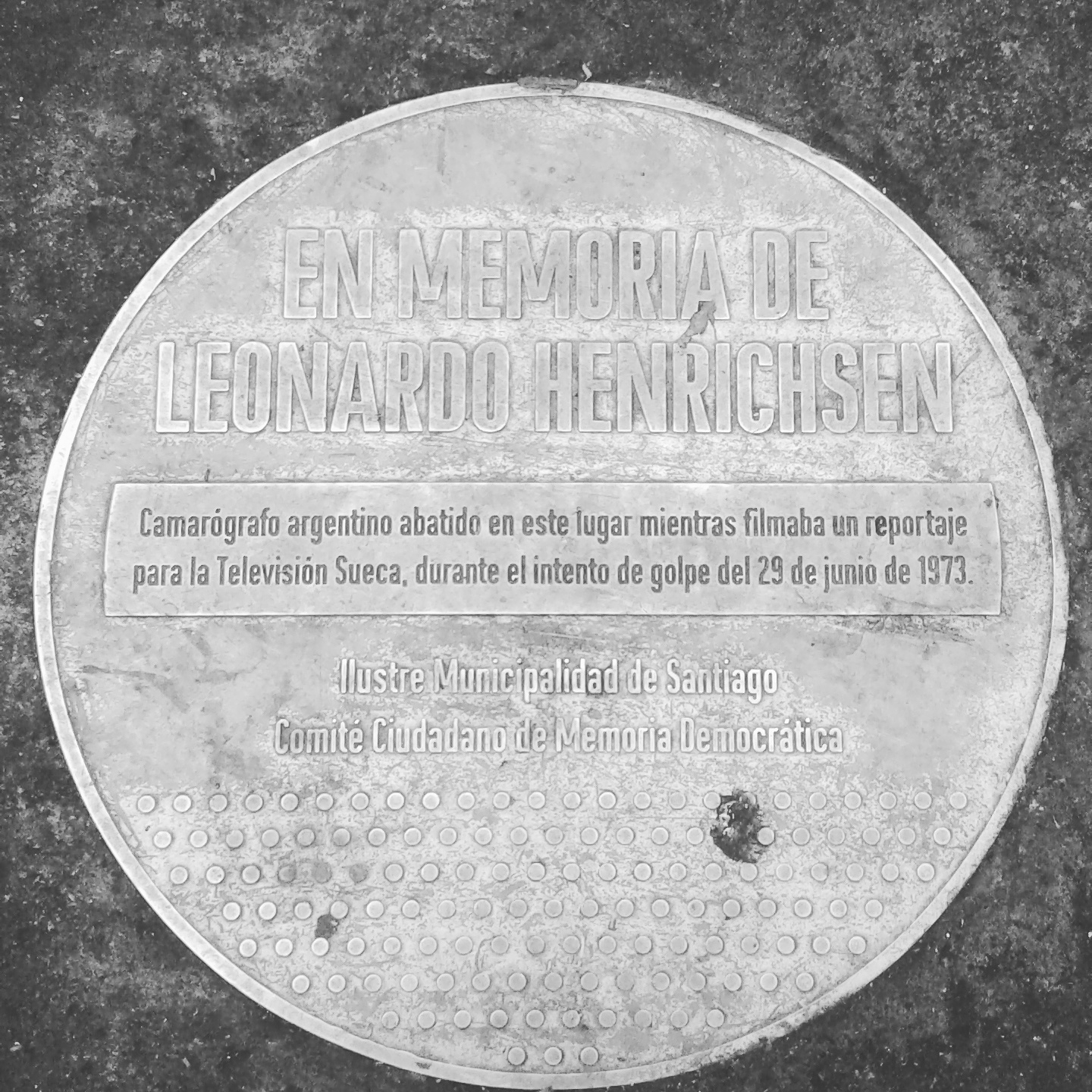
Plaque in memory of Leonardo Henrichsen at the place where he fell on Agustinas Street, installed on June 29, 2013, 40 years after its death.

SVT enlisted Henrichsen, who had covered 14 violent coups for their current events program, Rapport, to their bureau in Santiago, Chile. Working with chief correspondent Jan Sandquist, his first assignment there was during a massive, October 1972 truckers' strike in protest over the program of nationalization being advanced by Chile's Socialist President, Salvador Allende. On the morning of June 29, 1973, the day of the attempted military coup known as the Tanquetazo, as Henrichsen had breakfast at the café in the Hotel Crillón (across La Moneda Presidential Palace in downtown Santiago), the sound of gunfire erupted outside, leading him and Sandquist to rush to cover the event. As he began filming, a detachment in a mutineering Chilean Army regiment attempting to storm La Moneda, attacked protesters and bystanders nearby and, noticing him and his camera, the ranking officer, Corporal Héctor Bustamante Gómez shot his pistol at Henrichsen, prompting his men to fire, as well. Appealing to them that they cease firing at two journalists, Henrichsen was struck by the third shot (from an as-yet-unidentified conscript), causing him to collapse in Sandquist's arms while still filming. He was 33. This happened two weeks before Henrichsen was supposed to go on his first-ever trip to Sweden and to his father's home town of Gothenburg.

Corporal Bustamante visibly attempted to destroy the evidence, seizing Henrichsen's Éclair 16 II camera and pulling the film out. The Éclair, however, possessed a second, backup chamber, where the event remained recorded and from which Sandquist was able to distribute the footage on July 24.

Lieutenant Colonel Roberto Souper and the other participants in the failed coup attempt against President Allende were given refuge in the Embassy of Ecuador (whose dictatorship was hostile to Allende). Promoted to a high-ranking post within Chile's intelligence services (DINA) following the September 11, 1973, coup against Allende, Souper continues to enjoy impunity and Corporal Bustamante had no charges brought against him until his role in the murder was confirmed by Chilean documentarian Ernesto Carmona in January 2005, following his 7-year-long investigation.

Josephine and Andrés Henrichsen (the journalist's daughter and son) filed a wrongful death suit against Bustamante on October 28, 2005. Chilean criminal court Judge Rommy Rutherford ruled that the case had expired its statute of limitations, though after reviewing the case, Chilean Appellate Court Judge Jorge Zepeda Arancibia ordered a reopening of the investigation into the deaths of Leonardo Henrichsen and three other Argentines murdered there in 1973. Bustamante died on December 18, 2007, while awaiting trial in Arica, Chile.

In 1989, the Argentine Congress established June 29 as the 'National day of the cameraman' in Henrichsen's memory.
