= Tanquetazo =

1973 Chilean coup d'état attempt against the government of Salvador Allende

- Part of the Cold War and prelude to the 1973 Chilean coup d'état
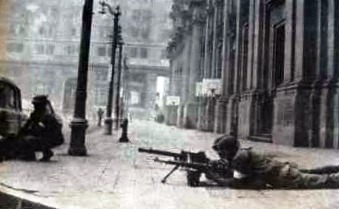
- Two Chilean soldiers with a machine gun lie at the south side of La Moneda during the attempted coup.
Date	29 June 1973
Location	Chile
Action	Insurgents attempt to seize La Moneda
Result	Government victory: Insurgents surrendered or exiled

Government-Insurgents
(Chile) Chilean Government	(Chile) 2nd Armored Regiment

Commanders and leaders
(Chile) Salvador Allende (Chile) Carlos Prats (Chile) Augusto Pinochet	(Chile) Roberto Souper

Political support
All parties in Congress of Chile	Far-right paramilitary and political movement "Patria y Libertad"

El Tanquetazo or El Tancazo (Spanish: "The tank putsch") was an attempted coup d'état that occurred in Chile on 29 June 1973.

Elements of an armored regiment of the Chilean Army led by Lieutenant Colonel Roberto Souper tried to overthrow the Popular Unity government of President Salvador Allende. Souper's regiment fired on buildings of the Chilean Government in central Santiago with tanks and small arms in which 22 people were killed. Loyalist soldiers led by Army commander-in-chief Carlos Prats successfully put down the coup within hours. Souper and most of the soldiers involved in the coup surrendered to Prats while some fled in exile to Ecuador.

The Tanquetazo was unsuccessful but is considered to have weakened Allende's Popular Unity government and contributed to the successful 1973 Chilean coup d'état three months later.

== Background ==
By the beginning of June 1973, an important part of the high command of the Chilean Armed Forces had lost all respect for the Popular Unity government of President Salvador Allende, which had been in office since November 1970. During the so-called Tacnazo of 1969, high-ranking officers learned that by exerting pressure as a group, they could achieve wide-ranging changes within the military. In 1969 they had achieved high command changes and an increase in the Armed Forces' budget. In June 1973, some began plotting against the Allende government.

A week before the coup attempt, the conspiracy was discovered at the Santiago Army garrison. The garrison commander, General Mario Sepúlveda Squella, informed his immediate superiors at the Army General Staff, and also told José Tohá, the Minister of Defense. The government immediately arrested nine people involved in the conspiracy, and Minister Tohá decided to go public with this information on the afternoon of 28 June.

== Putsch ==
Early in the morning of the following day, Lieutenant Colonel Roberto Souper, who had just learned that he would be relieved of his command for his part in the conspiracy, led a column of sixteen armored vehicles, including six M41 tanks, M3 half-tracks, plus 80 soldiers from the 2nd Armored Regiment in Santiago. The rebel column rapidly traveled to downtown Santiago from its base in Santa Rosa Avenue and encircled the presidential palace, La Moneda, and the building housing the Ministry of Defense, just across the Plaza de la Libertad. Two minutes before 9:00 AM, the tanks opened fire on these buildings.

At the Ministry, a tank made its way to the main entrance, climbed the steps into the building, and started firing on offices. Sergeant Rafael Veillena, of the Army's Second Division, was killed when he looked out a ninth-floor window. The firing of machine guns and tanks panicked workers in the area, who at that hour were making their way to their jobs downtown. A woman working at the State Bank near the Ministry was killed, as well as a couple who were caught in cross-fire. At least 16 people were wounded, four seriously. A group of foreign journalists covering the reforms carried out by Allende's government was caught in the middle of the insurrection. While filming the events outside La Moneda, Argentine cameraman Leonardo Henrichsen and his colleague Jan Sandquist were fired at by corporal Héctor Hernán Bustamante Gómez and several soldiers. Henrichsen was fatally shot by a soldier, who was never identified. Before collapsing in the arms of Sandquist, Henrichsen recorded the military foot patrol firing at him. The footage was recovered by Sandquist and shown on Argentine television on 24 July.

General Mario Sepúlveda Squella immediately called General Guillermo Pickering, commander of the military institutes, requesting loyal troops to suppress the rebellion. After securing these troops, he called Army Commander-in-chief General Carlos Prats with a plan to neutralize Souper's forces. General Prats approved it immediately, and a few minutes later General Sepúlveda Squella started to position his own troops.

Earlier that morning, Salvador Allende spoke to the people of Chile from the presidential residence at Tomas Moro in Santiago. In a 9:30 AM radio address, the president announced his unequivocal decision to defend the constitutional government against an attempted coup d'état. He called upon the workers of Santiago to occupy the factories "and be ready in case it is necessary to fight alongside the soldiers of Chile."

In the meantime, General Prats visited all the nearby military regiments around Santiago to secure their support against the coup. The General encountered some resistance from the officers at the Junior Officers' Academy, who claimed that they did not want to fire against fellow soldiers. Prats insisted that the insurrection against the constitutional government had to be put down, and as Army Commander-in-chief, he ordered them to the streets. After a brief moment of indecision, they chose to support him, and soon after 10:30 AM, combat-ready units from the Academy joined the fight against the rebels.

Driving toward La Moneda, General Prats thought about the likely effects of these actions on other military units, who might be participating or, at least, waiting to act until they had seen the initial results. Prats decided to use all the resources available to crush the rebellion before noon.

Near the presidential palace, General Prats left his car carrying a Thompson submachine gun. A large number of people had already congregated nearby, watching the movement of troops. Colonel Julio Canessa arrived with forces from the Junior Officers' Academy, and Prats ordered pieces of heavy artillery be deployed along the principal Avenue. He took what he subsequently called "a calculated risk" by speaking directly to the mutinous soldiers in an effort to convince them to give up their fight. Prats sought to prevent a long confrontation and unnecessary military and civilian casualties. According to his later account: "I then decided to advance in the company of Lieutenant Colonel Osvaldo Hernández, Captain Roger Vergara, and First Sergeant Omar Vergara. Extremely moved, Villaroel, the Military Chaplain, gave us the last absolution."

At 11:10 AM, the four soldiers walked along Alameda Avenue carrying assault weapons. When they reached the palace, they were within steps of Tank E-2814. The commander of the tank trained his machine gun on the group but did not fire. Prats ordered him to come down, identify himself, obey his orders, and surrender to the soldiers of the Junior Officers' School. According to the account of a journalist watching the events nearby, "the soldier came down, stood at attention before the general, and saluted. That tank would not again fire against the Ministry of Defense or La Moneda on that morning." Prats successively repeated these orders to the men in other tanks and combat vehicles located south of the Palace. When a soldier shouted from a tank: "I will not surrender, General!", while pointing his machine gun at Prats's group, Major Osvaldo Zabala approached him from behind and put a gun to his temple, disarming him and bringing the tense standoff to an end.

A few of the tanks fled rather than surrendering after reinforcements from the "Buin" First Infantry Regiment arrived at the scene. The unit, led by General Augusto Pinochet, quickly deployed its cannons and machine guns. The last rebelling unit to flee was a group of tanks and military vehicles stationed north of La Moneda. As this convoy fled south, General Prats saw Lt. Colonel Souper, "who looked disoriented and lost."

Immediately General Prats entered the palace and ordered a general search of the buildings nearby. General Pickering had cleared the rebels out of the western sector near the presidential palace. By 11:30 AM, the shooting around La Moneda had subsided, and the coup attempt appeared to be over.

== Aftermath ==
Souper surrendered later that day, after units from the 1st Artillery Regiment "Tacna" encircled and fired on the 2nd Armored barracks where he and his troops had taken refuge. Other military officers involved in planning the putsch were René López, Edwin Ditmer, Héctor Bustamante, Mario Garay, Carlos Martínez, Raúl Jofre, and José Gasset. It was soon discovered that the main leaders of the fascist group Fatherland and Liberty had been the instigators. Pablo Rodríguez Grez, John Schaeffer, Benjamín Matte, Manuel Fuentes, and Juan Hurtado sought asylum in the Embassy of Ecuador. From there they released a communique acknowledging that they had promoted the attempted coup.

During the evening, President Allende addressed a massive demonstration of support in front of La Moneda. As he neared the end of his speech, he said: "...trust your government. Go home and kiss your wives and children in the name of Chile."

Though the tanquetazo was unsuccessful, it was a turning point in the deteriorating political situation of Chile. The failure allowed the conspirators to check loyalties, and push the government to take steps towards an alliance with the Christian Democracy party. Christian Democracy's leader Patricio Aylwin demanded the formation of a coalition cabinet, to include members of the armed forces. Allende rejected his proposal.

The tanquetazo is seen as the prelude to the successful coup of 11 September 1973. Amongst other consequences, Army Intelligence officers conducted a thorough study of the weaponry used against the rebelling troops, and the locations from which they were fired. Additionally, the strength of the so-called "industrial belts", traditional strongholds of pro-government workers, was accurately gauged and concluded to be weak, even after Allende's call on all workers to defend the government.

== See also ==
- 1970 Chilean presidential election
- Chile under Allende
- Chile under Pinochet
- Government Junta of Chile (1973)
- History of Chile
- Project FUBELT - secret CIA operations to unseat Allende.
- U.S. intervention in Chile
