= Antonio Llidó =

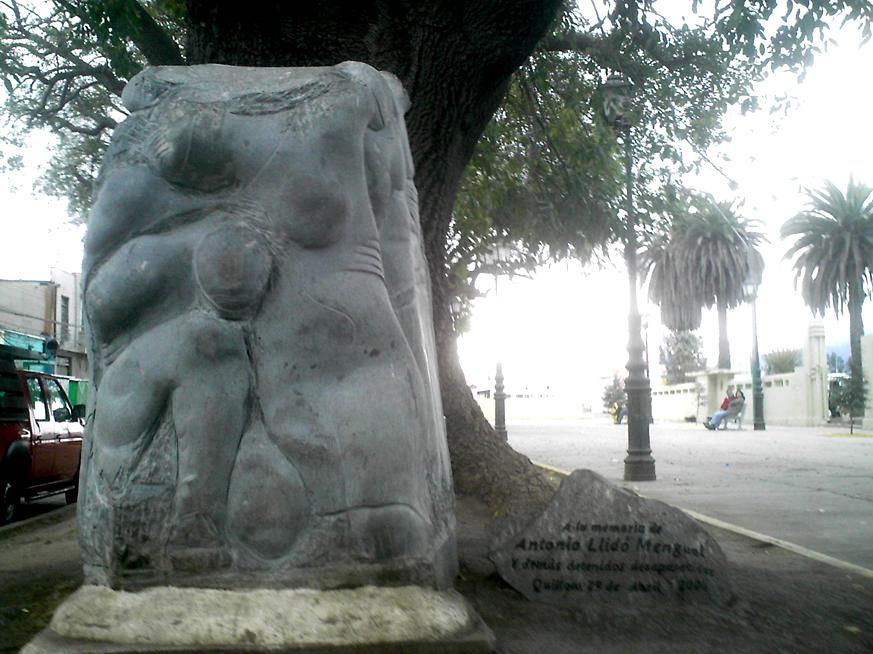
Antonio Llidó's Memorial Plaza de los Ceibos, Quillota, Chile

Antonio Llidó Mengual (Xàbia, Alicante Province, Spain, 29 April 1936 – Santiago de Chile, 25 October 1974) was a Spanish Roman Catholic priest and pedagogue who became a leading member in the Christians for Socialism Movement and the Marxist-Leninist Movimiento de Izquierda Revolucionaria (Revolutionary Left Movement) in Chile. Llidó was born just before the outbreak of the Spanish Civil War and had grown up in war-torn Spain. He had left his country to free himself from some of the restraints of the Catholic Church hierarchy and Franco’s repression.

During his missionary work in Chile he settled and lived among the impoverished workers and peasants of the Quillota province. Here he intimately experienced the daily struggle to survive of the local people and came to completely identify with their yearnings for social change. Like many politically conscious youth of his time in Chile, he became active in a number of political organizations that worked to organize and mobilize the poor to fight for social change.

After the Pinochet-led coup of 11 September 1973 he was arrested, tortured and executed. He is among the list of people deemed disappeared under the Pinochet regime. His tragic ordeal through the torture centers of the Pinochet regime has been traced and recreated via the testimonies of various fellow detainees or witnesses who spent time with him before his forced disappearance.
