= Juan Guzmán Tapia =

Chilean judge (1939–2021)

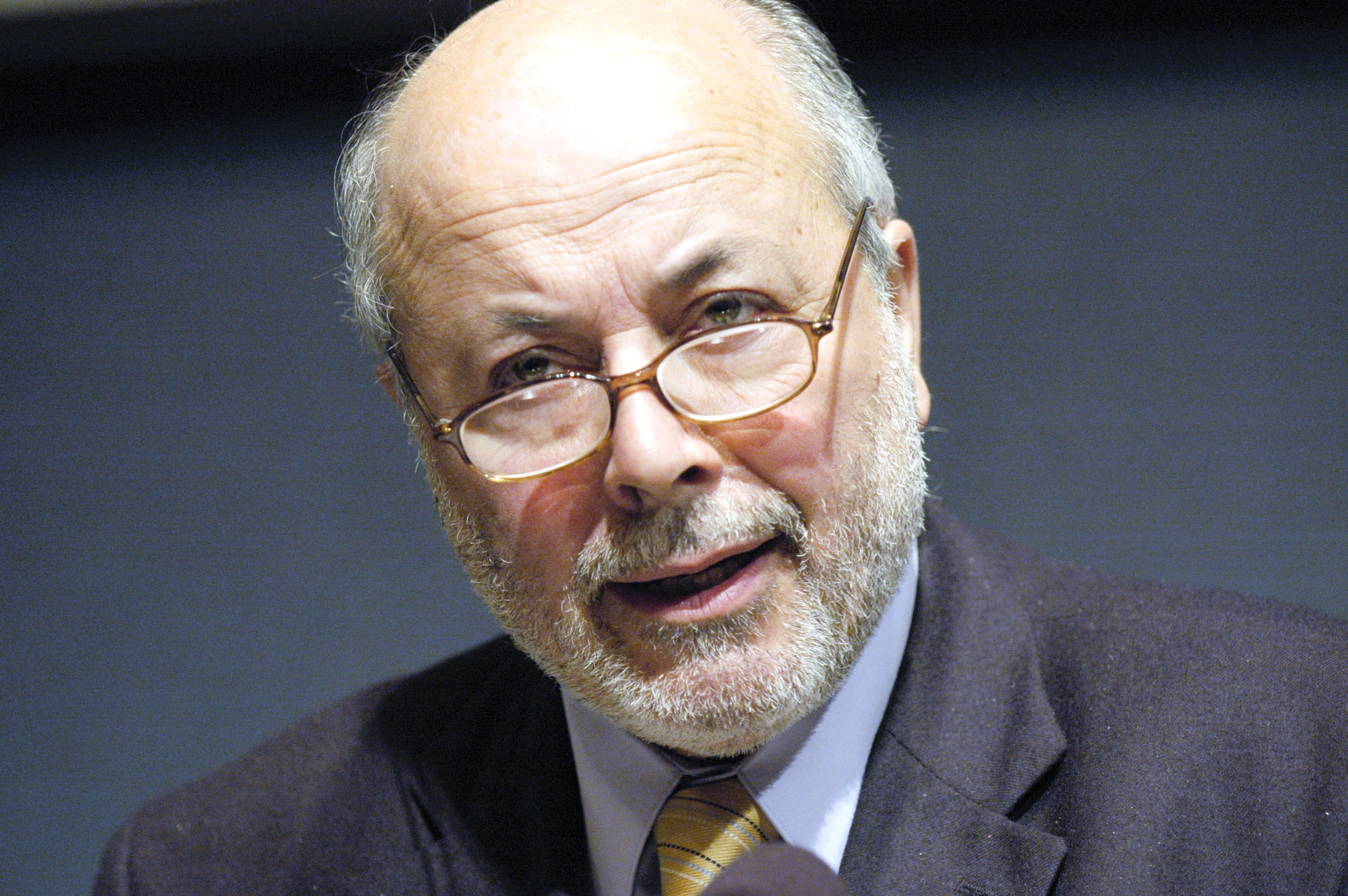
- Born: 22 April 1939; San Salvador, El Salvador
- Died: 22 January 2021 (aged 81); Chile
- Occupation: Judge
- Known for: Augusto Pinochet's arrest and trial

Juan Salvador Guzmán Tapia (Spanish pronunciation: [xwaŋ ɡusˈman ˈtapja]; 22 April 1939 – 22 January 2021) was a Chilean judge who lead the investigation and subsequent prosecution of Augusto Pinochet for violations of human rights during his dictatorship between 1973 and 1990. As a special prosecutor, he used novel legal strategies to hold Pinochet and members of his military regime accountable for the killings and human rights violations during this period.

== Early life ==
Guzmán was born on 22 April 1939 into a Chilean diplomatic family of Basque descent in San Salvador, El Salvador. His father Juan Guzmán Cruchaga was a diplomat and a poet, while his mother was involved in the arts, having been trained in theater and sculpture. However, his godfather was salvadoran dictator: general Maximiliano Hernández Martínez. Guzmán was exposed to US culture early in his life, having spent his early years between 4 and 12 in San Francisco and Washington. He also spent time in Venezuela and Colombia, before going on to studying law at the Pontifical Catholic University of Chile and obtaining a postgraduate degree from the University of Paris in the late 1960s. During his stay in Paris, he witnessed the events of May 68 and met his wife, Inés Watine Dubrulle, the daughter of a World War II French Resistance fighter.

A fluent French speaker, Guzmán played a minor, uncredited acting role in the 1972 Costa-Gavras film, State of Siege (set in Uruguay, but filmed in Chile), which explores American covert actions in South America preceding Operation Condor.

== Career ==
=== Early years ===
Guzmán started his career as a regional magistrate in the early 1970s and went on to become an appeals court judge in Santiago and Talca by the time Augusto Pinochet gave up power in the early 1990s. Speaking of his early years as a sheltered conservative, Guzmán said that he and his family initially cheered as Pinochet overthrew democratically elected socialist President Salvador Allende in a military coup. However, this changed many years later when he learnt of the true extent of the actions undertaken by Pinochet and his secret police.

=== Prosecution of Augusto Pinochet ===
Guzmán was amongst the first few judges to lead the investigation and prosecution of Pinochet for killings and other human rights violations undertaken by his regime between 1973 and 1990. Through the 1990s and early 2000s, Guzmán led a risky legal campaign to fully investigate the crimes and drive redressals using a combination of novel legal strategies. Under the judicial system in force in Chile at the time, judges had both investigative and prosecutorial responsibilities in addition to presiding over the courts.

When democracy returned to Chile in the early 1990s, the true extent of the human rights abuses by Pinochet and his military regime started to surface. On 12 January 1998, human rights lawyers in Chile submitted the first of more than 70 lawsuits against Pinochet. Guzmán was appointed to take charge of the investigation. During this time, Pinochet was arrested in London in October 1998 under orders of Spanish judge Baltasar Garzón on charges of genocide and other crimes against Spanish citizens in Chile. However, Pinochet was finally deemed unfit for trial and returned home to Chile in March 2000 after 17 months of house arrest in London. Guzmán immediately applied to have Pinochet's legal immunity revoked and have him placed under house arrest in Santiago.

Chilean investigation commissions including the commission on truth and reconciliation had documented over 3,000 victims of executions and disappearances, and a different commission had estimated at least 80,000 survivors of human rights abuses. Guzmán got together a team of detectives and other forensic experts to lead the investigation. He traveled from city to city interviewing relatives of people who had been executed or had disappeared and survivors of human rights abuses. As a part of the investigations, he uncovered mass graves and secret prisons. He was often admonished by senior judges for the tactics used including taking journalists along on these missions to document the discoveries.

Pinochet had issued a blanket amnesty to his military and security officials for any crimes committed before 1978. However, Guzmán secured the arrests of the accused by applying a little-used interpretation of the 1978 auto-amnesty law. He argued that since many of the bodies of the military squads' victims were still missing, it could be argued legally that these people are still kidnapped. Therefore, Guzmán argued, the crime is continuing and neither the auto-amnesty law nor the statute of limitations can be applied until the bodies are found: the crime of permanent sequestration was created by this jurisprudence, thus permitting prosecution for the forced disappearances.

In December 2000, Guzmán formally charged Pinochet for kidnapping during his 1973–1990 dictatorship, and questioned him for two hours in January 2001 after doctors said he was fit to undergo interrogation. That same month, Guzmán placed the general under house arrest.

In July 2001, the charges were suspended and later dropped on health grounds. In May 2004, the Court stripped Pinochet again of his immunity from prosecution over fresh charges concerning Operation Condor. In September 2005, the Court acceded to Guzmán's request to strip Pinochet of his immunity concerning Operation Colombo.

Despite all of the efforts, Pinochet died in 2006, with charges and multiple cases continuing to remain pending. Speaking later, Guzmán would say, "The important thing is what we leave to our children and here they are going to be able to say, 'Look, here a dictator was judged.'"

=== Later years ===
Guzmán retired in 2005. In a memoir, The Edge of the World, published later that year, he revealed that he had come under political pressure to drop the case against Pinochet.

After his retirement, he served as the director of the Center for Human Rights at the Universidad Central de Chile. In 2008, Guzmán called for the lifting of the United States blockade of Cuba. He also voiced his support for the Cuban Five, whose arrest Guzmán deemed as unjust and arbitrary.

== Media ==
The 2008 documentary The Judge and the General documented his efforts to bring Pinochet to justice for the crimes committed by his regime. The documentary was produced and directed by Elizabeth Farnsworth and Patricio Lanfranco. The show was aired on PBS in the United States.

== Personal life ==
Guzmán was married to French-born Inés Watine Dubrulle. The couple had two daughters. He was an art collector who donated several of his Pre-Columbian South American art collection pieces to museums in Chile including the Museo del Carmen de Maipú. Titled the Guzmán–Watine collection, it spanned Chile, Peru, Ecuador, and Colombia.

He lived in Santiago and suffered from dementia in the latter part of his life. He died on 22 January 2021. The cause for his death was not announced. He was 81.

== Works ==
- La sentencia. Editorial Jurídica de Chile. 1996. ISBN 978-956-10-1144-1.
- Juan Guzmán Tapia; Olivier Bras (2005). En El Borde del Mundo: Memorias del Juez Que Proceso a Pinochet. Anagrama. ISBN 978-84-339-2570-1.
