= Víctor Montiglio =

Chilean judge

Minister of the Supreme Court of Chile
- In office 18 October 2005 – 30 March 2011
- Appointed by: Ricardo Lagos

Personal details
- Born: 21 January 1944 Santiago, Chile
- Died: 30 March 2011 (aged 67) Santiago, Chile
- Education: Pontifical Catholic University of Valparaíso (LL.B)
- Profession: Lawyer

Víctor Montiglio Rezzio (21 January 1944−30 March 2011) is a Chilean lawyer who served as president of the Supreme Court of Chile.
