= Operation Colombo =

Massacre in Chile

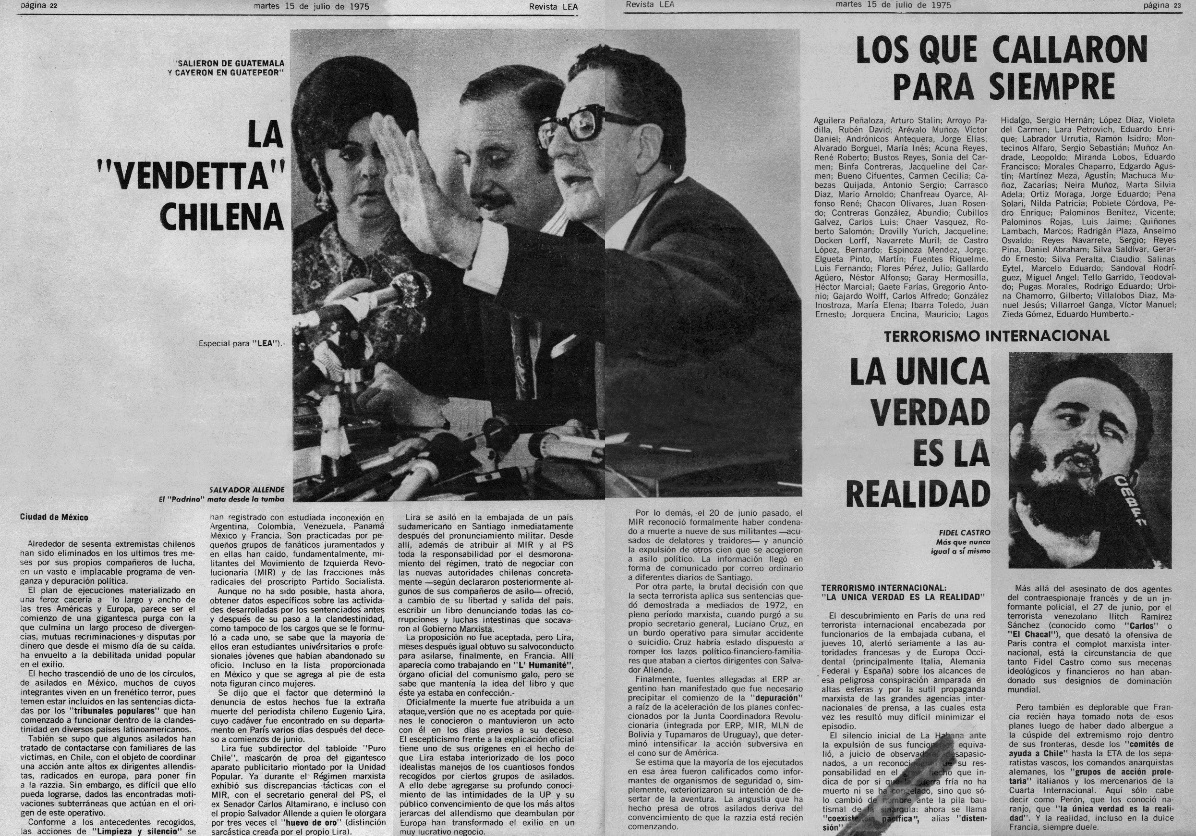
- Location: Chile
- Date: 1975
- Attack type: Forced disappearance, state terrorism
- Deaths: 119 abducted and killed
- Perpetrator: Dirección de Inteligencia Nacional
- Motive: Political repression, anti-communism

Operation Colombo, or the Case of the 119, was an operation undertaken by the DINA (the Chilean secret police) in 1975 to make political dissidents disappear. At least 119 people are alleged to have been abducted and later killed. The objective of the operation was to deceive national and international public opinion—through the publication of false information in media outlets in Chile and abroad—stating that the disappeared had died in clashes with foreign security forces or had been victims of internal purges.

Most of those killed were members of the Revolutionary Left Movement (MIR). However, there were also militants from the Communist Party (PC), the Socialist Party (PS), the Popular Unitary Action Movement (MAPU), the Communist League of Chile, as well as some people without political affiliation. In 2006, the Chilean College of Journalists confirmed the role and the numerous breaches of professional ethics that the newspapers El Mercurio, La Segunda, Las Últimas Noticias and La Tercera had in the framework of the Colombo operation.

== Background ==
By late 1974, the military dictatorship headed by Augusto Pinochet was already being openly questioned internationally for the systematic human rights violations—including arbitrary detentions, torture, and the existence of hundreds of disappeared detainees—reported since September 11, 1973. In November, the United Nations General Assembly had approved a resolution calling for the "restoration of basic human rights and fundamental freedoms in Chile," and a month later, the final report of the Inter-American Commission on Human Rights of the Organization of American States was released—prepared after a visit to Chile by a group of investigators from that organization—which found that the military regime had committed "extremely serious human rights violations."

At the same time, knowledge of the role played by the United States Central Intelligence Agency (CIA) and the numerous allegations of torture and disappearances began to generate opposition to the military dictatorship within the US Congress. As a result of these continuous revelations, in October 1974, the United States Senate, at the initiative of Democratic Senator Ted Kennedy, rejected military assistance to Chile for more than $20 million. Later, in January 1975, it created the Church Committee to investigate the CIA's covert actions over the past decades, including its role in the coup against Salvador Allende.

In this context, during the first months of 1975, the DINA began organizing a strategy to convince national and international public opinion that the number of disappeared detainees did not exist or was minimized. This consisted of attributing the disappearances to internal political disputes within the left, specifically the Revolutionary Left Movement (MIR). The purpose of reproducing these reports in the Chilean press was to support the government's position: that there were no disappeared detainees, but that the people sought by their families had fled the country.

== Operation Colombo ==
The disinformation campaign was organized by Álvaro Puga Cappa, Director of Civil Affairs for the Military Junta and Head of Psychological Operations at the DINA, who was responsible for providing national and international journalists with press reports to cover up the crimes committed against the 119 disappeared detainees. Puga was also a columnist for La Segunda at the time, under the pseudonym "Alexis."

DINA took advantage of media outlets by publishing false stories with the intentions of misleading the public. DINAs goal was to convince the public that they had a foreign enemy who were responsible for the kidnapping and killing of Chileans. These fabricated stories included names of missing victims and stories about how they were killed in clashes between Argentine security forces. However, days later the Chilean church-sponsored committee for peace published a comprehensive report detailing direct evidence that seventy-seven individuals on the list of the missing 119, had been last seen detained by Chile security personnel before they disappeared. Rightist media outlets in Chile published stories containing evidence and details of mutilated corpses resulting from Operation Colombo. These stories contained the names of the victims and included details of how the victims had died in internecine battles within the Chilean Movimiento de la Izquierda Revolucionaria (movement of the revolutionary left-MIR). The bodies of victims were discovered with handwritten signs that read “executed by the MIR” meaning these individuals had been members of the revolutionary left movement and had been killed as a result of an internal struggle.

=== First montages ===
On April 16, 1975, a mutilated body was found on Sarmiento Street in Buenos Aires. It contained an identity card identifying him as Chilean chemical engineer David Silberman. Silberman was a member of the Communist Party and had been general manager of Cobre Chuqui until the 1973 coup d'état. He was serving a thirteen-year prison sentence in the Santiago Penitentiary for violating the State Security Law after being tried by a court martial when he was kidnapped on October 4, 1974, by DINA agents. Since then, his whereabouts have remained unknown. Years later, former agent Enrique Arancibia Clavel would confess that Silberman's alleged appearance in Buenos Aires had been an operation—dubbed "Colombo"—commissioned by Raúl Iturriaga Neumann to lure a "Chilean subversive" into the world of Argentina.

In the following months, Chile's major newspapers began publishing stories about "alleged missing persons" who were believed to be alive outside of Chile. On June 13, La Tercera published an article titled "Chilean Extremists Train in Tucumán," which highlighted that "among the extremists are a large number of members of the Mir and other Marxist groups who are publicly listed as missing," while media outlets such as El Mercurio published headlines such as "Chilean Extremists Train in Guerrilla Action" (La Segunda, June 12), "Armed Miristas Cross into Chile" (El Mercurio, June 16), and "Extremists Cross the Border" (Las Últimas Noticias, June 16).

=== Clashes and Purges ===
In early July, the Military Junta suddenly canceled the visit to Chile of the UN Commission on Human Rights, scheduled for July 11, which was intended to investigate allegations of human rights violations. According to the government, it was not a cancellation, but rather a "postponement until a more opportune moment." That same July 11, the day the commission was originally scheduled to arrive, two charred bodies appeared in the city of Pilar, north of Buenos Aires, inside a car, with the identifications of Chileans Jaime Robotham and Luis Guendelman, members of the MIR, detained and disappeared since 1974. Over both bodies there was a banner that read: "Discharged by the MIR. Black Brigade." Eight days later, another body appeared, this time with the alleged identification of Juan Carlos Perelman, also a member of the Mirista movement, detained in Santiago and missing since February 20, 1975.

The Buenos Aires magazine Lea, for its part, published on July 15 a list of 60 "Chilean extremists eliminated by their own comrades in struggle" in Argentina, Colombia, Venezuela, Panama, Mexico, and France. Lea only had one issue, with a circulation of 20,000 copies, printed by the Codex Editorial, which depended on the Ministry of Social Welfare of Argentina, headed at that time by José López Rega. Following direct instructions from Isabel Perón, López Rega founded the Argentine Anti-Communist Alliance in 1973, a death squad responsible for numerous human rights violations between 1973 and 1976. Previously, on June 25, the Curitiba, Brazil, newspaper Novo O Día had reported the murder of 59 Miristas in "clashes with Argentine government forces in Salta." (Note: O Dia was an old Curitiba daily newspaper founded in 1870 and relaunched in 1896, 1901, 1923 and 1975. In 1975 it reappeared under the name Novo O Dia and had three printings, which were financed with resources from LAN Chile and the Chilean embassy in Brazil, channeled through DINA agent Gerardo Roa Araneda, who was also a LAN official.)

Following the reports from the two foreign publications and the UPI news agency cables that had reported the discovery of the charred bodies in Buenos Aires, the main Chilean media outlets began to replicate the news of these alleged clashes in the following weeks, with headlines such as "Massacre between MIR members reveals crude maneuver against Chile" (La Tercera, July 16), "Bloody internal "vendetta" within the MIR" (Las Últimas Noticias, July 16), "Ferocious struggle between Chilean Marxists" (La Segunda, July 18), "60 murdered MIR members identified" —with the caption "Executed by their own comrades"— (El Mercurio, July 23), "The MIR has murdered 60 of its men" (La Tercera, front page of July 23) and "Bloody The MIR's struggle abroad" (Las Últimas Noticias). The evening paper La Segunda, based on the publication of Novo O Día, headlined on its front page on July 24, 1975, "Exterminated like rats," accompanied by the caption "59 Chilean MIR members killed in military operation in Argentina."

A few days later, El Mercurio wrote on its editorial page:

The foreign politicians and journalists who so often questioned the fate of these MIR members and blamed the government for the disappearance of many of them now have the explanation they refused to accept. Victims of their own methods, exterminated by their own comrades, each of them points out with tragic eloquence that the violent ones eventually fall victim to the blind and implacable terror they provoke, and that, once they follow this path, nothing and no one can stop them.

== Questions to the official version ==
Despite the intense coverage of information, as the days passed, strong questioning of the information published by the national media quickly began. Due to the fact that the magazines O Día and Lea were unknown, that the lists were made up of missing persons who had been the subject of amparo appeals, that there were no bodies and the lack of new information, at the same time that the main countries involved began to deny the existence of armed confrontations with guerrillas. International media such as La Opinión of Argentina, Time magazine and the New York Times questioned the official version maintained by the Military Junta. In parallel, relatives of Robotham and Guendelman, after traveling to Buenos Aires, denied that the bodies found in the Argentine capital were theirs. El Mercurio, in a new editorial published on August 3, reluctantly validated the questions, stating: "Is it Is the information being provided credible as a whole? Apparently not; and at the very least, a clarification or precise confirmation from the authorities should be expected at this point."

On August 1, the Pro-Peace Committee filed a request with the Supreme Court to appoint a visiting minister for the people detained and disappeared during their arrests. They insisted on knowing the whereabouts of these individuals due to the new information that emerged from the alleged information about 119 Chileans killed in Argentina. This request was denied two months later by the Supreme Court.

Despite the doubts, the Military Junta insisted on its version of the clashes and criticized the questions as a smear campaign abroad against the military regime. It was not until August 20, during a ceremony in San Bernardo for the birthday of Bernardo O'Higgins, that General Augusto Pinochet officially addressed the case of the 119. On that occasion, he announced an investigation into the matter, but it was never carried out.

On December 1, 1977, two years after the false publications, the Chilean ambassador to the UN, Sergio Diez, denied before the United Nations General Assembly the existence of disappeared detainees and insisted on the government's version that many victims corresponded to internal purges within the MIR, or that other people simply did not legally exist, or were dead or exiled.

== Aftermath ==
Years after the Colombo operation was discovered, secret DINA files were discovered in the Buenos Aires office and home of Arancibia Clavel that included lists and identity documents of the 119 missing Chileans and reports that discussed the modus operandi of Operation Colombo.

Arancibia Clavel was the only defendant that was indicted for the assassination of Carlos Prats and Sofia Cuthbert. In September 2004, Guzmán Tapia indicted sixteen former members of the DINA for Operation Colombo. In November 2005, Judge Victor Montiglio indicted Pinochet for his role in Operation Colombo, and in May 2008, he indicted ninety-eight DINA leaders and former agents for the abductions and forced disappearances of sixty victims of Operation Colombo. All listed victims had been abducted and held in various clandestine detention centers in Chile.

== See also ==
- Caravan of Death
- Operation Condor
- Dirty war
