= Sergio Arellano Stark =

Chilean military officer

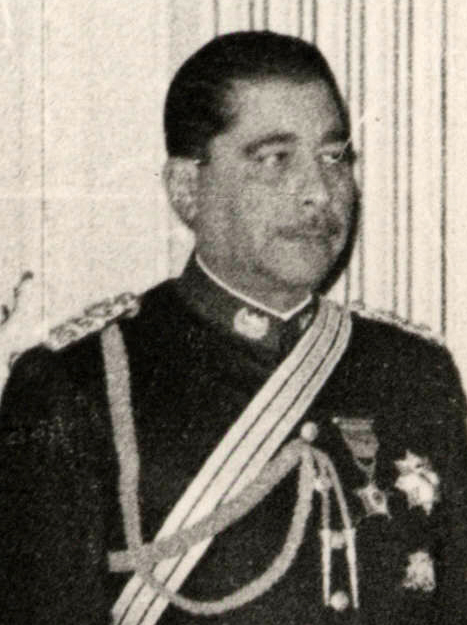
- Arellano Stark as aide de camp for Eduardo Frei Montalva
- Born: 10 June 1921; Santiago, Chile
- Died: 9 March 2016 (aged 94) Santiago, Chile
- Branch: Chilean Army
- Service years: 1964–1976
- Rank: Lieutenant general
- Commands: National Intelligence Directorate
- Spouse: Raquel Iturriaga

Sergio Arellano Stark (10 June 1921 – 9 March 2016) was a Chilean military officer. He led the so-called "Caravan of Death," which killed 97 Chileans from helicopters and established Augusto Pinochet’s hold on power.

== Biography ==
Born on June 10, 1921 in Santiago, Arellano Stark quickly advanced through the ranks of the military. He trained at the Command and General Staff College at Fort Leavenworth, Kansas. In the 1960s, he was an aide to President Eduardo Frei Montalva and served in Spain.

Arellano Stark was one of the key officers involved in the September 11, 1973 coup that deposed democratically elected President Salvador Allende and led to the installment of Pinochet. After the coup, Arellano Stark handpicked a squad to spend two months going from town to town searching for dissidents under the military junta. Once the rebels were killed, their names were crossed off a list. The "Caravan of Death" was estimated to have killed 75 political prisoners. The helicopter squad surprised several commanders, who were not expecting it to brandish heavy firearms and instead were planning a grand parade. Soldiers were ordered to perform summary killings, and bodies were dumped in mine shafts or in the Atacama Desert.

Arellano Stark's squad helped maintain Pinochet in power for 17 years. Arellano Stark retired from the military in 1976 and got involved in a number of business ventures. In 1978, Pinochet pardoned members of the military from prosecution for human rights abuses. However, in 1999, the Chilean Supreme Court made an exception for missing victims. In 2001, in an interview with a television network, retired general Joaquin Lagos Osorio said that Arellano Stark showed him paperwork in 1973 that revealed his role as Pinochet's delegate in order to “review and accelerate” the judicial process for rebels. Osorio described the death squad in detail:

They cut eyes out with daggers. They broke their jaws and legs. They shot them to pieces, first the legs, then the sexual organs, then the heart, all with machine guns. . . . They were no longer human bodies. I wanted to at least put the bodies back together again, to leave them more decent, but you couldn’t.

Arellano Stark disputed these claims, saying garrisons were disobedient to his commands. Nonetheless, in 2008 the Supreme Court convicted Arellano Stark for his role in the deaths of four people in San Javier. He was sentenced to six years in prison, which was not carried out due to his declining mental health. He died on March 9, 2016. The cause of death was complications from Alzheimer's disease.
