= Lucía Hiriart =

Widow of Augusto Pinochet

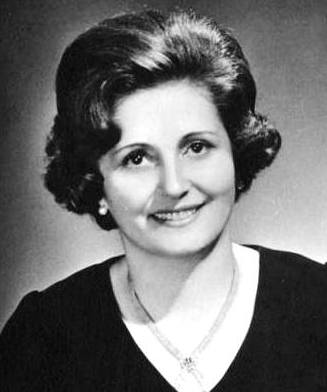
- Hiriart circa 1974

First Lady of Chile
- In role 17 December 1974 – 11 March 1990
- President: Augusto Pinochet
- Preceded by: Hortensia Bussi
- Succeeded by: Leonor Oyarzún

Personal details
- Born: María Lucía Hiriart Rodríguez; 10 December 1923 Antofagasta, Chile
- Died: 16 December 2021 (aged 98) Santiago, Chile
- Spouse: Augusto Pinochet (m. 1943; died 2006)
- Children: 5, including Inés Lucía Pinochet

María Lucía Hiriart de Pinochet (née Hiriart Rodríguez; 10 December 1923 – 16 December 2021) was the wife of former Chilean dictator Augusto Pinochet.

== Early life and education ==
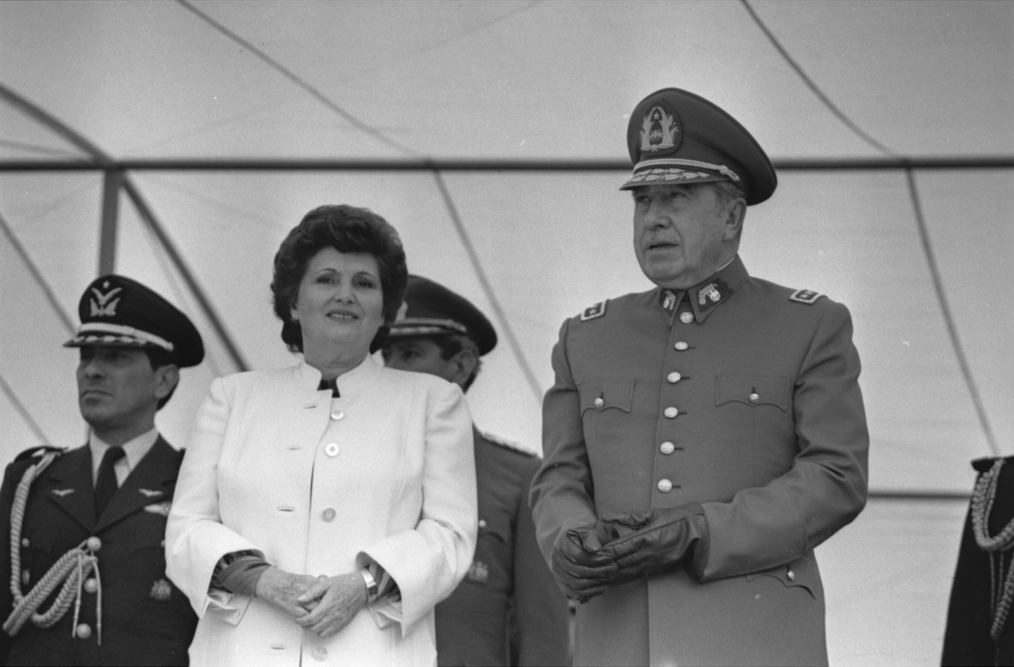
Lucía Hiriart and Augusto Pinochet

Hiriart was born into a wealthy family in Antofagasta, on 10 December 1923 to Osvaldo Hiriart Corvalán, a lawyer, former Radical Party senator, and former Interior Minister of president Juan Antonio Ríos; and Lucía Rodríguez Auda de Hiriart, of Basque French descent.

== Legal accusations ==
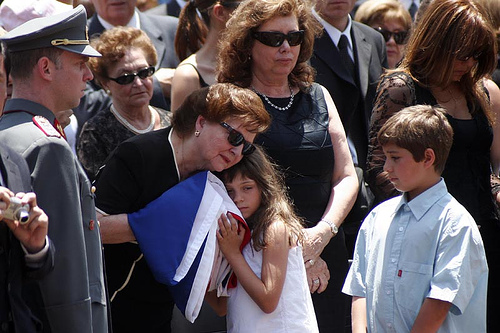
Lucía Hiriart and members of her family at the funeral of her husband Augusto Pinochet on 12 December 2006.

In 2005, Hiriart was sued by Chile's Internal Tax Service (Servicio de Impuestos Internos) over tax evasion totaling US$2.35 million and was arrested with her son Marco Antonio a few months later. In October 2007, she was arrested again in the frame of the Riggs Bank case, along with Pinochet's five children and 17 other people (including two generals, one of his former lawyers and his former secretary) on charges of embezzlement and use of false passports. They were accused of having illegally transferred $27m (£13.2m) to foreign bank accounts during Pinochet's rule.

In August 2016, Hiriart was accused of using funds from her NGO, CEMA Chile. During Pinochet's time under house arrest in London, two separate transfers were made from Chile to herself, in 1998 and 1999. Each transfer was totaled to be $50,000. According to the prosecutors, the money was used to pay for Pinochet's living expenses. Hiriart was sued by two Communist Party lawmakers from Chile, Hugo Gutierrez and Karol Cariola, along with the Relatives of Disappeared Detainees Group (AFDD) for misuse of public assets owned by CEMA Chile for misappropriation of public assets, tax fraud, and embezzlement. CEMA Chile is accused of illegally acquiring more than 30 properties for more than $18 million. During the investigation, Hiriart resigned following a news report from November 2015 stating that she had used sales and rentals of public lands from CEMA Chile for her own benefit.

== Personal life and death ==
On 30 January 1943, Hiriart married Augusto Pinochet Ugarte, then a Chilean Army Infantry School lieutenant. They had five children – three daughters (Inés Lucía, María Verónica, and Jacqueline Marie) and two sons (Augusto Osvaldo and Marco Antonio).

On 30 December 2018, Hiriart was hospitalized after falling at her home in Santiago and fracturing her arm and several ribs.

Hiriart died from heart failure in Santiago on 16 December 2021, at the age of 98.

== In popular culture ==
Hiriart was portrayed by Gloria Münchmeyer in the 2023 black comedy horror film El Conde directed by Pablo Larrain.

Honorary titles
Preceded by Hortensia Bussi	First Lady of Chile; 1974—1990	Succeeded by Leonor Oyarzún
