= Fatherland and Liberty =

Fatherland and Liberty Patria y Libertad
- Logo of the group. The "Spider" of the Nationalist Front Fatherland and Liberty. According to Manuel Fuentes Wendling the symbol was created with the aim of being associated with the Nazi swastika.
- Leader: Pablo Rodríguez Grez
- Founded: 1971
- Dissolved: 12 September 1973
- Succeeded by: National Advance (unofficial)
- Ideology: Neo-fascism
- Political position: Far-right
- Colors: Black & white

The Fatherland and Liberty Nationalist Front (Spanish: Frente Nacionalista Patria y Libertad or simply Patria y Libertad, PyL) was a Chilean fascist political and paramilitary group that fought against the democratically elected Popular Unity government of Salvador Allende in Chile.

The group was formed by Pablo Rodríguez Grez in 1970 with Roberto Thieme as secretary general, and turned more and more clandestine throughout the presidency of Salvador Allende.

In June 1973, the group attempted to carry out a coup against the Allende government but failed, in an event known as the Tanquetazo. In July 1973, it received orders from the Chilean Navy, which opposed the Schneider Doctrine of military adherence to the constitution, to sabotage Chile's infrastructure. The collaboration between Fatherland and Liberty and the Chilean Armed Forces increased after the failed October 1972 strike which had sought to overthrow Allende socialist administration. In agreement with the sectors opposing Allende in the military, the group assassinated on 26 July 1973 Allende's naval aide, Arturo Araya Peeters. The first sabotage was committed this same day. Others include creating a power outage while Allende was being broadcast.

It was officially disbanded on 12 September 1973, following Pinochet's coup. Many members of PyL were then recruited by Chilean security services and participated in the persecution of those opposed to Pinochet's junta. Still others like Roberto Thieme became convinced opponents of the regime (Thieme in particular opposed the neo-liberal economic policies under Pinochet). Since the transition to democracy, some small groups have since claimed to be its successor, but are not officially linked to the original PyL.

== Creation of the group ==
Headed by Pablo Rodríguez Grez, the group was spawned in the Pontifical Catholic University of Chile. It formally organized itself in 1970, a short time after the election of Salvador Allende. Patria y Libertad gathered mainly upper and middle-class students, united by common anti-communist beliefs, engaged in street brawls against leftist militants and sympathizers, armed with nunchakus and molotov cocktails. Patria y Libertad hoped to overthrow socialism in Chile. Along with the youth movement of the Christian Democracy, the youth of the National Party and the "Comando Rolando Matus" (CRM), the paramilitary group formed and integrated by the youth of this last political party, they participated in demonstrations against the President Salvador Allende's socialist government.

== Financial support ==
The group was funded by the CIA during the first year of Allende's presidency, including via the Agency's Track II program. According to Prof. Michael Stohl, and Prof. George A. Lopez, "After the failure to prevent Allende from taking office, efforts shifted to obtaining his removal. At least $7 million was authorized by the United States for CIA use in the destabilizing of Chilean society. This included financing and assisting opposition groups and right-wing paramilitary groups such as Patria y Libertad ('Fatherland and Liberty')". Although PyL was already dissolved, some of their former integrants continued collaborating with Pinochet's regime. Former head of DINA Manuel Contreras declared to Chilean justice in 2005 that the CNI, successor of DINA, handed out monthly payments between 1978 and 1990 to the persons who had worked with DINA agent Michael Townley in Chile, former members of PyL: Mariana Callejas (Townley's wife), Francisco Oyarzún, Gustavo Etchepare and Eugenio Berríos. Assassinated in 1995, Berrios, who worked as a chemist for the DINA in Colonia Dignidad, also worked with drug traffickers and DEA agents. Michael Townley has been convicted for the 1976 assassination of former Chilean minister Orlando Letelier, and was involved in the 1974 assassination of General Carlos Prats in Buenos Aires.

== Clandestine activities ==
=== June 1973 sabotage plan ===
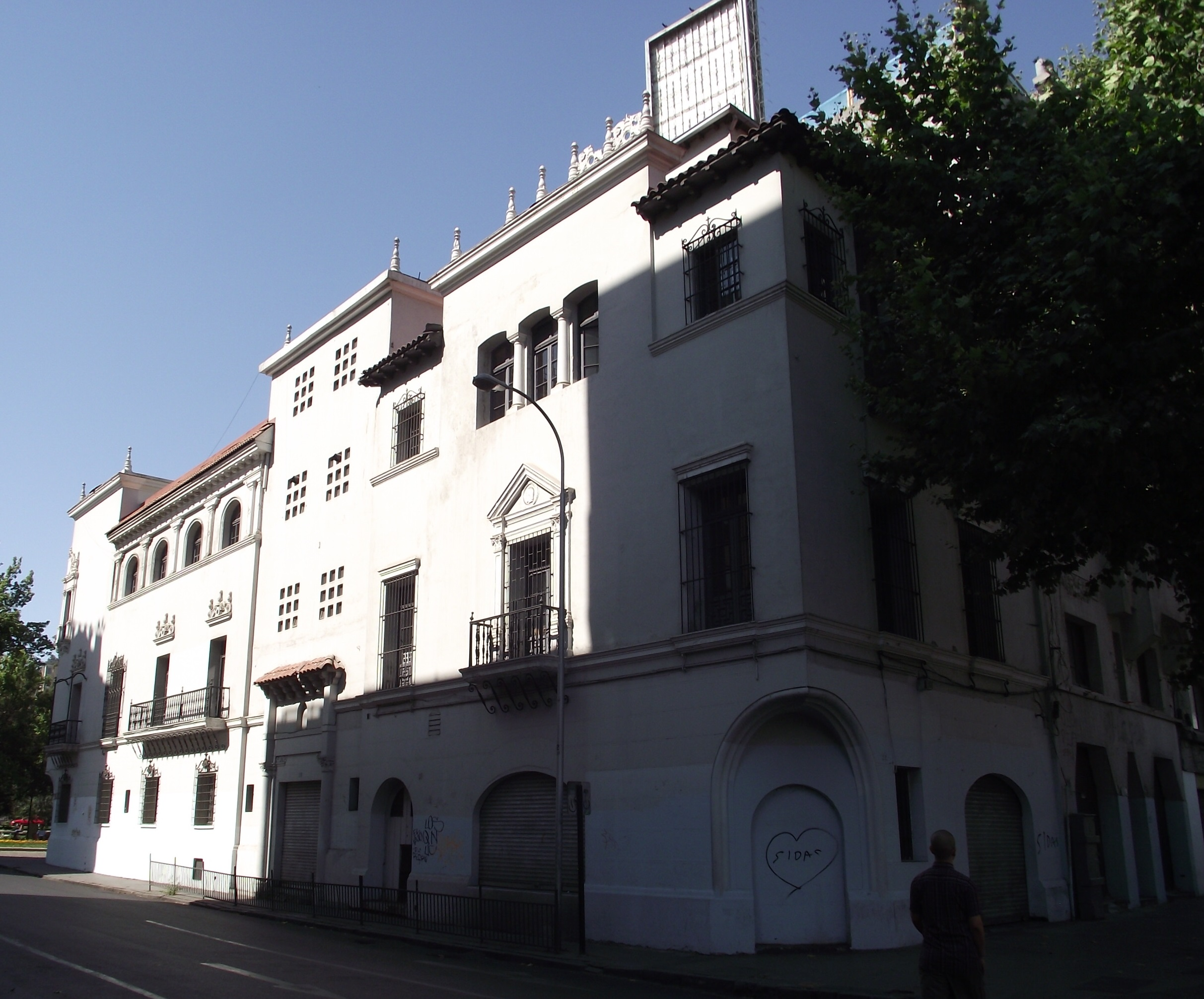
Building that served as Patria y Libertad headquarters in Santiago.

The Chilean Navy's June 1973 plan included sabotaging bridges, oil pipelines, energy towers and the fuel supply. The plan was revealed after the transition to democracy by Roberto Theime, leader of military operations for Fatherland and Liberty. Thieme exiled himself to Argentina after the failed Tanquetazo, but returned to Chile in mid-July 1973, two months before the military coup. Thieme also revealed that in 1973, he was pressured by the military to assassinate Senator Carlos Altamirano, who had been the general secretary of the Socialist Party since 1971.

=== Olof Palme assassination ===
The Swedish journalist Anders Leopold, in his 2008 book Det svenska trädet skall fällas, makes the case that PyL leader Roberto Thieme was the assassin in the still-unsolved 1986 murder of Swedish prime minister Olof Palme. According to Leopold, the Swedish prime minister was killed because he had freely given asylum to so many leftist Chileans following the 1973 coup against Salvador Allende.

== 2004 declarations ==
Roberto Thieme, leader of the military operations of PyL, signed on 2 December 2004, along with other leaders José Agustín Vásquez and Arturo Hoffmann, a declaration which referred to the Valech Report and begged pardon for their responsibilities in the repression against civilians operated by Pinochet's junta. They indicated that many members of the group had been recruited by the Chilean security services and had thus collaborated to the repression, including acts of torture and of forced disappearances. Thieme also opposed the neoliberal economic policies of Pinochet's regime, and criticized Pinochet's lack of repentance following his 1998 arrest in London and subsequent judicial procedures in Chile.

== Judicial procedures ==
Juan Patricio Abarzúa Cáceres, a former member of PyL, was arrested in 2005, charged in the "disappearance" of Juan Heredia, a Popular Unity government sympathiser "disappeared" on 16 September 1973.

== See also ==
- Chile under Allende
- United States intervention in Chile
- Pablo Rodríguez Grez, who later headed the legal team defending Pinochet
- Tacuara Nationalist Movement, a similar Argentine group
- Spider, 2019 film directed by Andrés Wood.

== Bibliography ==
- Blum, Williams. Killing Hope: U. S. Military and CIA Interventions Since World War II - Part I, London: Zed Books, 2003, ISBN 1-84277-369-0
- Paredes, Alejandro. La Operación Cóndor y la guerra fría. Universum [online]. 2004, vol.19, no.1, p. 122–137. ISSN 0718-2376
- Church Committee (20 November 1975). Interim Report: Alleged Assassination Plots Involving Foreign Leaders (PDF) (Report). U.S. Government Printing Office.
