= Opinion polling for the 2021 Chilean presidential election =

After the previous 2017 Chilean general election in November and December, different polling companies published surveys that tracked voting intention for the 2021 Chilean general election, especially the presidential election. Outgoing president Sebastián Piñera was not eligible for reelection.

Official primaries were held on 18 July where two coalitions, left-wing Apruebo Dignidad and right-wing Chile Vamos, chose their respective presidential candidates Gabriel Boric and Sebastián Sichel. Centre-left coalition New Social Pact held their own primary on 21 August 2021 where they selected Yasna Provoste as their official candidate. Other candidates were José Antonio Kast of the Christian Social Front coalition, Franco Parisi of the Party of the People, Marco Enríquez-Ominami of the Progressive Party, and Eduardo Artés of the Patriotic Union.

The first round of the election took place on 21 November 2021. Since no candidate alone received more than 50% of the votes, a runoff took place on 19 December 2021 between Gabriel Boric and José Antonio Kast. Boric won the runoff with 55.87% of the vote and will assume office on 11 March 2022.

== First round ==
=== After official registration of candidates ===
Results considering only official candidates (excluding "Other", "Don't know", "Do not vote", etc.) and general voters, excluding polls showing likely voters or non-national samples.

Fieldwork dates	Polling firm	Type of poll								Others/ None
Fieldwork dates	Polling firm	Type of poll	Artés UPa	Boric AD	M. E-O PRO	Provoste NPS	Parisi PDG	Sichel ChP+	Kast FSC	Others/ None
20 Nov 2021	Cadem	Base 100. Online panel. (Note: Under Chilean law, polls can't be published two weeks before the election. However, some polling firms carried some surveys during the time and published the results internally or after the election.)	2	27	5	11	13	14	29	—
16–19 Nov 2021	Cadem	Base 100	1	27	9	11	12	13	27	—
5–6 Nov 2021	AtlasIntel		2.8	21.9	6.2	9.2	11.4	11.7	27.2	9.7
2–5 Nov 2021	Activa		1.9	17.7	3.9	10.9	7.3	8.2	21.7	28.4
2–5 Nov 2021	Activa	Likely voter (51.6%)	1.9	23.7	4.5	13.5	9.9	11.3	27.3	7.9
2–4 Nov 2021	Cadem		2	19	5	9	10	8	25	22
2–3 Nov 2021	UDD		2	22	5	10	10	9	25	17
1–2 Nov 2021	AtlasIntel		2.5	21.4	4.2	12.2	10.1	9.2	31.0	9.4
29 Oct–2 Nov 2021	Criteria		2	24	6	9	8	8	23	19
29 Oct–2 Nov 2021	Criteria	Likely voter (51%)	2	34	4	12	8	8	28	4
29 Oct–2 Nov 2021	Criteria	Likely voter (41%)	2	35	4	11	10	6	29	3
29 Oct–2 Nov 2021	Feedback	Likely voter (48%)	1	30	2	9	4	11	36	7
26–31 Oct 2021	Studio Público		1.9	27.6	4.7	11.4	5.9	10.5	37.9	—
29 Oct 2021	Tú Influyes		2	32	4	13	8	9	27	5
27–29 Oct 2021	Cadem		1	19	4	11	7	8	24	26
25–29 Oct 2021	Activa	Likely voter (50.8%)	2.6	25	5.1	12.1	10.6	9.1	26.5	9
25–29 Oct 2021	Activa		1.6	17.4	4.8	9.5	7.3	6.9	22.2	30.3
20–26 Oct 2021	La Cosa Nostra		2	36	4	14	5	11	30	—
20–22 Oct 2021	Cadem		1	20	5	12	6	7	23	26
18–22 Oct 2021	Criteria	Likely voter	2.0	30.8	3.5	10.9	7.7	8.1	27.7	9.3
12–15 Oct 2021	Activa	Likely voter (50.9%)	2.4	31.3	3.7	16.5	6.9	8.9	20.2	10.1
12–15 Oct 2021	Activa		1.6	21.3	3.4	13.1	5.0	7.5	16.3	31.8
13–14 Oct 2021	Cadem		3	20	4	12	6	7	21	27
6–8 Oct 2021	Cadem		1	21	4	13	6	10	18	27
5–7 Oct 2021	UDD		2	24	4	10	6	14	19	21
1–5 Oct 2021	Criteria	Open-ended	1	26	3	11	5	15	17	20
1–4 Oct 2021	Tú Influyes		3.1	25.7	3.7	11.5	4.9	12.1	16.1	22.9
29 Sept–1 Oct 2021	Cadem		1	22	5	12	5	12	15	28
27 Sept–1 Oct 2021	Activa	Likely voter (48.4%)	1.8	29.7	3.1	11.2	7.6	15.3	17.2	14.1
27 Sept–1 Oct 2021	Activa		1.4	19.8	2.7	8.6	5.7	12.5	14.0	35.3
23–24 Sept 2021	Cadem		2	23	4	10	5	17	13	26
20–21 Sept 2021	Black & White		1	29	—	14	7	24	16	9
15–16 Sept 2021	Feedback	Likely voter (56%)	2	34	1	7	4	27	16	9
15–16 Sept 2021	Feedback		2	27	2	9	7	23	19	11
14–16 Sept 2021	Cadem		1	25	5	9	6	17	10	27
6–14 Sept 2021	La Cosa Nostra		3	36	3	15	5	27	12	—
7–13 Sept 2021	Activa	Likely voter (54.3%)	2.5	28.0	—	11.9	10.9	17.5	14.0	15.2
7–13 Sept 2021	Activa		1.7	19.9	—	9.9	7.0	11.8	8.7	41.0
8–10 Sept 2021	Cadem		0	22	3	10	8	19	9	29
3–6 Sept 2021	Tú Influyes		1.5	26.5	2.6	11.3	5.5	17.8	10.9	24.0
1–3 Sept 2021	Cadem		0	23	2	12	7	19	12	25
27–31 Aug 2021	Criteria	Open-ended	1	25	1	12	6	19	8	28
26–27 Aug 2021	Cadem		1	20	3	13	7	20	10	26
24–27 Aug 2021	Activa	Likely voter (51.9%) (Note: The poll included the candidacies of Diego Ancalao and Gino Lorenzini, before being rejected by the Electoral Service. Ancalao obtained 1.5% of the preferences and Lorenzini 5.1%.)	1.2	23.4	3.6	12.3	8.8	14.0	8.9	27.9
24–27 Aug 2021	Activa		0.7	16.4	3.6	11.3	6.1	11.5	6.3	44.1
24–25 Aug 2021	Black & White	(Note: The poll included the candidacies of Diego Ancalao and Gino Lorenzini, before being rejected by the Electoral Service. Ancalao obtained 2% of the preferences and Lorenzini 7%.)	1	22	3	12	8	26	15	13
24–25 Aug 2021	UDD	(Note: The poll included the candidacies of Diego Ancalao and Gino Lorenzini, before being rejected by the Electoral Service. Ancalao obtained 1.1% of the preferences and Lorenzini 4.4%.)	1.4	21.8	4.1	12.9	7.7	20.0	10.7	21.4

==== Regional polls ====
Fieldwork dates	Polling firm	Region								Others/ None
Fieldwork dates	Polling firm	Region	Artés UPa	Boric AD	M. E-O PRO	Provoste NPS	Parisi PDG	Sichel ChP+	Kast FSC	Others/ None
1 Oct-4 Nov 2021	IPP UCN	Antofagasta	0	11	5	12	10	1	9	52
24-28 Oct 2021	Go People	Santiago	1.7	19.1	8.8	8.6	3.6	7.2	17.3	33.8
23-24 Sept 2021	UDD	Santiago	3	26	4	9	4	16	12	26

=== Before official registration of candidates ===
Graph includes results considering main candidates in polls of general voters (excluding regional polls or with only likely voters). "Other", "Don't know", "Do not vote" or similar options are not included. Average of polls every 14 days.

For this table, the candidates shown are those that have at least one poll with more than 5% of the votes or have been chosen as representative of an official party as their presidential candidate for primaries or the first round.

Date	Polling firm	Type of poll	N/A	Ap. Dignidad			Constituent Unity									Chile Vamos							Non-affiliated				Others/None
Date	Polling firm	Type of poll	! class="nowrap ts-vertical-header " style="" | Jiles (PH)	! class="nowrap ts-vertical-header " style="" | Jadue (PC)	! class="nowrap ts-vertical-header " style="" | Boric (CS)	! class="nowrap ts-vertical-header " style="" | Sánchez (Ind.-FA)	! class="nowrap ts-vertical-header " style="" | Enríquez-Om. (PRO)	! class="nowrap ts-vertical-header " style="" | Guillier (Ind.-UC)	! class="nowrap ts-vertical-header " style="" | Bachelet (PS)	! class="nowrap ts-vertical-header " style="" | Narváez (PS)	! class="nowrap ts-vertical-header " style="" | Muñoz (PPD)	! class="nowrap ts-vertical-header " style="" | Vidal (PPD)	! class="nowrap ts-vertical-header " style="" | Maldonado (PR)	! class="nowrap ts-vertical-header " style="" | Provoste (PDC)	! class="nowrap ts-vertical-header " style="" | Rincón (PDC)	! class="nowrap ts-vertical-header " style="" | Sichel (Ind.-ChV)	! class="nowrap ts-vertical-header " style="" | F. Kast (Evópoli)	! class="nowrap ts-vertical-header " style="" | Briones (Evópoli)	! class="nowrap ts-vertical-header " style="" | Desbordes (RN)	! class="nowrap ts-vertical-header " style="" | Piñera (Ind.-ChV) (Note: Incumbent president Sebastián Piñera is ineligible to run for reelection. However, he was mentioned in several occasions spontaneously, so his results are included in the table.)	! class="nowrap ts-vertical-header " style="" | Lavín (UDI)	! class="nowrap ts-vertical-header " style="" | Matthei (UDI)	! class="nowrap ts-vertical-header " style="" | J.A. Kast (PLR)	! class="nowrap ts-vertical-header " style="" | Parisi (PDG)	! class="nowrap ts-vertical-header " style="" | Farkas (Ind.)	! class="nowrap ts-vertical-header " style="" | Siches (Ind.)	Others/None
Yasna Provoste wins the Constituent Unity unofficial primaries, defeating Paula Narváez and Carlos Maldonado
13 Aug 2021	Cadem		—	—	24.0	—	—	—	—	2.0	—	—	1.0	9.0	—	22.0	—	—	—	—	—	—	9.0	—	—	—	33.0
13 Aug 2021	Activa	Likely voter	—	—	16.1	—	—	—	—	2.0	—	—	0.6	9.0	—	25.6	—	—	—	—	—	—	11.3	7.1	—	—	28.3
13 Aug 2021	Activa		—	—	14.7	—	—	—	—	1.8	—	—	0.3	7.1	—	20.4	—	—	—	—	—	—	10.2	4.6	—	—	40.9
6 Aug 2021	Cadem		—	—	21.0	—	—	—	—	2.0	—	—	1.0	10.0	—	24.0	—	—	—	—	—	—	10.0	—	—	—	32.0
3 Aug 2021	Criteria		—	3.0	25.0	—	—	—	—	—	—	—	—	11.0	—	25.0	—	—	—	—	2.0	—	7.0	3.0	—	—	24.0
2 Aug 2021	Data Influye		—	—	29.5	—	—	3.7	—	4.6	—	—	2.4	13.7	—	19.9	—	—	—	—	—	—	8.9	—	—	—	17.3
31 Jul 2021	Activa	Likely voter	—	—	28.3	—	0.9	—	—	1.1	—	—	1.3	15.8	—	19.6	—	—	—	—	—	—	6.8	6.9	—	—	19.3
31 Jul 2021	Activa		—	—	22.9	—	1.0	—	—	0.8	—	—	0.7	12.1	—	18.0	—	—	—	—	—	—	6.8	5.1	—	—	32.6
30 Jul 2021	Feedback		—	—	23.0	—	1.0	—	—	1.0	—	—	—	5.0	—	22.0	—	—	—	—	—	—	10.0	—	—	—	38.0
30 Jul 2021	Cadem		—	—	24.0	—	—	—	—	3.0	—	—	1.0	13.0	—	24.0	—	—	—	—	—	—	7.0	—	—	—	28.0
23 Jul 2021	Cadem		—	—	30.0	—	—	—	—	3.0	—	—	1.0	12.0	—	25.0	—	—	—	—	—	—	8.0	—	—	—	21.0
Constituent Unity announces they will hold unofficial primaries
Yasna Provoste announces her candidacy representing the Christian Democrat Party
Gabriel Boric and Sebastián Sichel win the primaries for Apruebo Dignidad and Chile Vamos respectively.
15 Jul 2021	Cadem		8.0	11.0	12.0	—	—	—	—	2.0	—	—	1.0	9.0	—	15.0	—	3.0	4.0	—	11.0	—	6.0	5.0	—	—	13.0
9 Jul 2021	Cadem		7.0	15.0	7.0	—	—	—	—	2.0	—	—	1.0	10.0	—	10.0	—	4.0	4.0	—	9.0	—	7.0	4.0	—	—	20.0
1 Jul 2021	Cadem		9.0	13.0	5.0	—	—	—	—	1.0	—	—	1.0	12.0	—	7.0	—	3.0	4.0	—	10.0	—	6.0	7.0	—	—	22.0
29 Jun 2021	Criteria		3.0	18.0	6.0	—	—	—	—	2.0	—	—	—	9.0	—	10.0	—	2.0	2.0	—	13.0	2.0	6.0	4.0	—	—	23.0
29 Jun 2021	Activa	Likely voter	2.9	18.5	6.8	—	—	—	0.1	—	—	—	—	10.9	—	11.9	—	1.7	1.4	—	15.0	1.2	2.8	4.3	—	—	22.5
29 Jun 2021	Activa		5.9	12.6	4.5	—	—	—	1.6	—	—	—	—	7.6	—	8.4	—	0.9	1.5	—	16.5	1.6	2.1	5.2	—	—	31.6
28 Jun 2021	Data Influye		2.4	19.8	10.3	—	—	—	—	1.8	—	—	—	10.8	—	10.3	—	1.8	3.3	—	13.9	—	4.5	1.7	—	1.0	18.4
24 Jun 2021	Cadem		6.0	14.0	6.0	—	—	—	—	1.0	—	—	1.0	9.0	2.0	9.0	—	2.0	2.0	—	13.0	—	6.0	4.0	—	—	25.0
17 Jun 2021	Cadem		8.0	13.0	6.0	—	—	—	—	3.0	—	—	1.0	13.0	2.0	5.0	—	1.0	2.0	—	13.0	—	5.0	5.0	—	—	23.0
11 Jun 2021	Cadem		7.0	13.0	3.0	—	—	—	—	2.0	—	—	1.0	14.0	2.0	6.0	—	2.0	2.0	—	14.0	—	7.0	6.0	—	—	21.0
11 Jun 2021	Activa	Likely voter	4.3	21.5	2.3	—	2.3	—	0.7	—	—	—	—	8.2	—	5.7	—	—	2.6	—	11.1	5.0	3.6	5.6	—	—	27.1
11 Jun 2021	Activa		5.0	16.0	1.4	—	1.5	—	1.9	—	—	—	—	6.2	—	4.3	—	—	1.8	—	16.0	3.6	2.7	4.0	—	—	35.6
3 Jun 2021	Cadem		8.0	14.0	5.0	—	—	—	—	2.0	—	—	—	13.0	2.0	8.0	—	2.0	2.0	—	14.0	—	7.0	6.0	—	—	17.0
1 Jun 2021	Criteria		4.0	16.0	4.0	—	—	—	—	2.0	—	—	—	9.0	—	8.0	—	1.0	2.0	—	14.0	5.0	6.0	2.0	—	—	27.0
31 May 2021	Data Influye		5.2	19.7	5.6	—	—	—	—	2.5	1.2	—	—	8.6	—	9.6	—	—	2.2	—	12.6	2.5	4.9	2.4	—	1.0	22.0
29 May 2021	Cosa Nostra		4.0	23.0	14.0	—	—	—	—	5.0	4.0	—	1.0	—	4.0	9.0	—	5.0	4.0	—	11.0	9.0	7.0	—	—	—	0.0
28 May 2021	Cadem		10.0	17.0	5.0	—	—	—	—	2.0	—	—	—	11.0	2.0	8.0	—	1.0	2.0	—	17.0	—	8.0	—	—	—	17.0
28 May 2021	Activa	Likely voter	6.9	17.4	1.8	—	—	—	0.7	2.5	—	—	—	7.3	—	6.0	—	—	2.7	—	13.1	2.9	5.2	5.0	—	—	28.5
28 May 2021	Activa		6.2	13.9	1.5	—	1.1	—	1.7	1.5	—	—	—	6.6	—	4.5	—	—	2.3	—	12.9	3.6	3.8	3.8	—	—	36.6
20 May 2021	Cadem		7.0	20.0	5.0	—	—	—	—	2.0	2.0	—	—	13.0	1.0	11.0	—	3.0	4.0	—	16.0	—	5.0	—	—	—	11.0
Primaries for Apruebo Dignidad and Chile Vamos are registered. Constituent Unity decides not to hold official primaries.
18 May 2021	Activa	Likely voter	8.7	19.2	2.2	2.3	1.0	—	—	1.3	0.3	—	—	3.6	2.3	3.3	—	—	0.6	—	13.5	7.7	5.0	—	0.2	—	28.8
18 May 2021	Activa		10.2	13.3	1.7	1.8	0.8	—	1.2	0.7	—	—	—	2.1	1.3	3.4	—	—	0.4	—	14.8	5.6	3.3	1.3	1.7	—	36.4
Matthei, Muñoz and Rincón desist of running for the Presidency
2021 municipal, gubernatorial and Constitutional Convention elections
3 May 2021	Criteria		15.0	13.0	2.0	—	—	—	—	2.0	2.0	—	—	3.0	—	5.0	—	—	3.0	—	11.0	7.0	6.0	1.0	2.0	—	28.0
30 Apr 2021	Activa	Likely voter	21.0	17.1	0.7	—	2.3	—	0.3	1.0	5.3	—	—	0.7	0.5	3.5	—	—	2.2	—	6.9	3.0	6.0	—	—	—	29.5
30 Apr 2021	Activa		21.7	10.3	0.6	0.6	2.1	—	1.7	0.6	2.8	—	—	0.6	—	4.2	—	—	1.4	—	7.8	3.0	4.8	1.4	—	—	36.4
30 Apr 2021	Cadem		18.0	11.0	3.0	—	—	—	—	2.0	3.0	—	—	4.0	3.0	5.0	—	3.0	4.0	—	10.0	7.0	6.0	—	—	—	21.0
26 Apr 2021	Data Influye		15.5	16.8	3.8	—	1.4	—	—	3.4	3.4	—	—	—	1.7	4.0	—	—	2.4	—	9.8	4.8	4.5	1.9	—	—	26.6
16 Apr 2021	Activa	Likely voter	17.5	18.6	1.9	—	2.8	—	0.5	2.3	0.8	—	—	0.1	4.4	2.8	—	0.3	1.8	—	8.7	4.7	4.1	2.9	—	—	25.8
16 Apr 2021	Activa		18.4	11.5	1.2	0.5	1.7	—	2.3	1.4	—	—	—	0.1	2.4	2.5	—	—	1.8	—	10.8	4.8	3.4	1.9	—	—	35.3
7 Apr 2021	Cadem	1st mention	20.0	11.0	3.0	—	—	—	—	3.0	4.0	—	0.0	—	4.0	6.0	—	—	4.0	—	14.0	7.0	5.0	—	—	—	19.0
7 Apr 2021	Cadem	All mentions	30.0	18.0	8.0	—	—	—	—	6.0	8.0	—	1.0	—	7.0	10.0	—	—	8.0	—	24.0	19.0	9.0	—	—	—	21.0
30 Mar 2021	Criteria		9.0	11.0	1.0	2.0	—	—	—	1.0	2.0	—	—	—	2.0	6.0	—	—	3.0	—	12.0	6.0	6.0	1.0	1.0	2.0	35.0
29 Mar 2021	Activa	Likely voter	12.6	11.2	2.1	1.9	2.5	—	1.0	0.4	1.2	3.3	—	—	1.0	5.6	—	0.7	2.1	—	14.0	6.8	3.9	1.3	2.7	—	25.7
29 Mar 2021	Activa		13.0	7.5	1.9	1.3	1.6	—	1.8	0.2	—	1.7	—	0.0	0.5	5.0	—	—	1.5	—	13.9	5.3	3.7	1.7	3.1	—	36.3
17 Mar 2021	CELAG	Likely voter	18.8	21.1	—	—	—	—	—	5.7	—	—	—	—	—	7.2	—	—	4.3	—	12.0	6.2	5.3	—	—	—	19.4
17 Mar 2021	CELAG		17.7	16.1	—	—	—	—	—	4.0	—	—	—	—	—	7.1	—	—	3.4	—	13.4	7.9	5.3	—	—	—	25.1
12 Mar 2021	Activa	Likely voter	7.4	15.4	0.2	2.5	1.7	—	0.2	1.3	2.0	0.7	—	—	0.8	6.1	—	0.2	3.7	—	10.8	7.5	3.2	4.3	—	—	32.0
12 Mar 2021	Activa		10.7	10.1	0.1	1.4	2.0	—	1.4	1.0	1.1	0.5	—	—	0.7	5.1	—	—	2.6	—	9.7	5.3	3.3	4.3	1.1	—	39.6
5 Mar 2021	Cadem		2.0	6.0	—	—	—	—	2.0	1.0	1.0	—	—	—	—	3.0	—	—	1.0	—	5.0	4.0	3.0	1.0	—	—	71.0
2 Mar 2021	Criteria		6.0	14.0	1.0	3.0	2.0	—	2.0	2.0	1.0	—	—	—	2.0	5.0	—	0.0	2.0	—	12.0	8.0	7.0	2.0	1.0	—	30.0
28 Feb 2021	Data Influye		6.1	17.9	—	0.9	0.5	—	0.8	4.4	1.9	0.6	—	—	1.3	5.4	—	0.0	1.9	—	8.4	5.7	4.4	2.1	0.7	—	37.0
26 Feb 2021	Activa	Likely voter	11.6	14.8	0.1	2.1	0.4	—	1.8	1.9	0.6	1.5	—	—	5.1	10.3	—	0.4	2.1	—	11.6	7.2	6.8	1.6	—	—	20.1
26 Feb 2021	Activa		9.9	7.9	0.0	1.2	0.6	—	1.8	1.0	—	0.8	—	—	2.6	7.1	—	1.5	1.2	—	14.4	4.2	4.9	3.3	0.4	—	37.2
12 Feb 2021	Activa	Likely voter	8.4	20.4	—	2.3	1.9	—	1.4	2.1	1.2	0.3	—	—	1.0	6.4	—	0.6	1.0	—	13.7	5.3	5.3	2.9	—	—	25.8
12 Feb 2021	Activa		7.2	12.0	0.0	2.5	1.1	—	1.7	1.1	—	0.3	—	—	0.7	4.4	—	—	1.0	—	16.1	6.5	3.6	2.2	0.3	—	39.3
12 Feb 2021	Cadem		2.0	6.0	—	—	—	—	1.0	2.0	1.0	1.0	—	—	1.0	1.0	—	0.0	1.0	—	4.0	4.0	3.0	1.0	—	—	72.0
5 Feb 2021	Cadem		3.0	6.0	—	—	—	—	2.0	2.0	1.0	1.0	—	—	1.0	4.0	—	0.0	1.0	—	4.0	5.0	2.0	2.0	—	—	66.0
3 Feb 2021	Data Influye		7.5	16.7	—	1.0	1.2	—	1.2	4.6	2.0	1.5	—	—	1.4	7.4	—	0.0	2.3	—	10.2	5.3	3.9	1.4	1.4	—	31.0
1 Feb 2021	Criteria		5.0	12.0	—	2.0	—	—	—	3.0	2.0	2.0	—	—	—	8.0	—	0.0	3.0	—	12.0	7.0	5.0	2.0	1.0	—	36.0
Heraldo Muñoz wins the internal primary of the PPD, defeating Francisco Vidal and Jorge Tarud.
29 Jan 2021	Activa	Likely voter	10.8	17.0	—	3.4	1.2	—	2.1	1.2	2.1	0.9	—	—	4.6	4.5	—	1.0	1.9	—	11.7	2.7	6.4	2.1	0.1	—	26.3
29 Jan 2021	Activa		11.8	10.7	—	2.6	0.8	—	2.6	0.7	1.5	1.0	—	—	3.0	4.0	—	—	1.2	—	10.3	2.2	5.3	2.0	2.6	—	37.7
29 Jan 2021	Cadem		2.0	8.0	—	—	—	—	3.0	2.0	1.0	1.0	—	—	—	4.0	—	0.0	1.0	—	6.0	4.0	3.0	1.0	—	—	64.0
Paula Narváez is proclaimed as the presidential candidate of the Socialist Party.
Ximena Rincón wins the internal primary of the PDC, defeating Alberto Undurraga.
22 Jan 2021	Cadem		2.0	8.0	—	—	—	—	2.0	2.0	1.0	1.0	—	—	—	4.0	—	0.0	1.0	—	6.0	4.0	3.0	1.0	—	—	65.0
15 Jan 2021	Cadem		2.0	7.0	—	—	—	—	1.0	—	1.0	1.0	—	—	—	4.0	—	0.0	1.0	—	7.0	4.0	3.0	—	—	—	69.0
15 Jan 2021	Activa	Likely voter	5.4	14.6	—	4.3	2.2	—	2.1	0.8	0.3	1.1	—	—	0.1	11.0	—	—	1.9	—	16.6	6.7	3.7	4.7	0.4	—	24.1
15 Jan 2021	Activa		8.5	8.9	—	2.3	1.8	—	4.8	0.4	—	0.7	—	—	0.1	6.6	—	—	1.2	—	13.5	6.8	3.3	2.9	1.6	—	36.6
5 Jan 2021	Criteria		7.0	12.0	—	2.0	2.0	—	2.0	1.0	1.0	2.0	—	—	—	7.0	—	0.0	3.0	—	11.0	9.0	6.0	2.0	2.0	—	31.0
4 Jan 2021	Data Influye		8.4	17.5	—	1.7	0.7	—	0.9	2.2	2.6	1.3	—	—	0.5	5.9	—	0.0	2.8	—	8.0	6.8	5.0	2.1	1.2	—	32.4
31 Dec 2020	Cadem		2.0	7.0	—	—	—	—	1.0	—	1.0	—	—	—	—	5.0	1.0	—	1.0	—	5.0	5.0	2.0	1.0	—	1.0	68.0
Daniel Jadue is proclaimed as the presidential candidate of the Communist Party.
28 Dec 2020	Activa	Likely voter	13.2	13.7	—	3.0	1.3	—	1.2	—	1.2	1.3	—	—	0.2	5.7	—	—	1.9	—	11.5	8.9	4.4	3.3	—	—	29.2
28 Dec 2020	Activa		11.9	9.1	—	2.6	0.7	—	2.3	—	0.8	0.8	—	—	0.1	6.2	—	—	1.3	—	12.7	7.2	3.4	2.4	1.1	—	37.4
14 Dec 2020	Activa	Likely voter	15.8	12.6	—	1.8	1.8	—	1.9	—	2.3	1.9	—	—	0.3	1.6	—	—	1.0	—	9.6	3.8	3.5	3.9	4.4	—	33.8
14 Dec 2020	Activa		13.8	7.8	—	1.9	2.5	—	3.9	—	1.4	1.3	—	—	0.2	1.6	—	—	1.1	—	11.9	5.2	2.9	2.9	3.5	—	38.1
10 Dec 2020	Cadem		4.0	7.0	—	1.0	—	—	3.0	—	1.0	1.0	—	—	—	1.0	2.0	—	—	—	6.0	6.0	2.0	2.0	—	—	64.0
9 Dec 2020	Criteria		9.0	15.0	—	3.0	1.0	—	1.0	—	2.0	3.0	—	—	—	3.0	—	—	1.0	—	10.0	9.0	6.0	4.0	1.0	—	32.0
30 Nov 2020	Data Influye		11.3	17.9	—	1.5	0.9	0.8	0.6	—	2.3	1.5	—	—	0.5	1.8	—	—	1.5	—	11.4	6.7	5.2	2.8	1.0	3.3	29.0
28 Nov 2020	Activa	Likely voter	13.4	14.5	—	3.5	1.6	—	1.3	—	2.6	0.8	—	—	0.5	0.7	—	—	0.5	—	11.4	7.0	2.2	1.8	1.2	—	37.0
28 Nov 2020	Activa		12.7	9.9	—	2.5	1.3	—	2.7	—	4.4	0.1	—	—	0.3	0.9	—	0.0	0.3	—	12.3	5.7	2.7	1.5	1.5	—	41.2
16 Nov 2020	Activa	Likely voter	9.5	12.2	—	1.8	1.9	—	3.0	—	2.1	1.3	—	—	0.2	0.9	—	—	1.0	—	14.5	6.0	4.3	6.6	2.7	—	32.0
16 Nov 2020	Activa		9.6	8.7	—	1.2	1.2	—	2.5	—	1.7	1.1	—	0.2	0.1	0.6	—	—	0.7	—	13.3	7.0	3.3	5.3	2.2	—	41.3
13 Nov 2020	Cadem		4.0	7.0	—	4.0	—	—	2.0	—	2.0	3.0	—	—	—	1.0	1.0	—	—	—	10.0	5.0	2.0	2.0	—	1.0	56.0
7 Nov 2020	Cadem		1.0	6.0	—	1.0	—	—	2.0	—	1.0	1.0	—	—	—	1.0	—	—	—	—	6.0	4.0	4.0	2.0	—	1.0	70.0
4 Nov 2020	Data Influye		7.1	17.8	—	3.0	0.9	0.6	0.9	—	2.7	1.7	—	—	0.7	2.6	—	—	1.9	—	12.1	6.6	5.2	2.9	1.4	2.3	29.6
3 Nov 2020	Criteria		7.0	14.0	—	5.0	1.0	—	2.0	—	2.0	2.0	—	—	—	1.0	—	—	2.0	—	14.0	8.0	7.0	3.0	2.0	—	30.0
2 Nov 2020	Activa	Likely voter	5.7	15.6	—	3.8	2.2	2.2	1.9	—	1.3	2.8	—	—	1.0	1.4	—	—	0.7	—	12.5	7.8	5.5	2.7	—	—	32.9
2 Nov 2020	Activa		5.2	10.8	—	3.3	2.7	1.5	2.5	—	3.8	2.4	—	—	0.6	1.0	—	0.0	0.5	—	11.6	6.3	5.0	3.2	0.9	—	38.7
30 Oct 2020	Cadem		2.0	6.0	—	2.0	—	—	2.0	—	1.0	2.0	—	—	—	—	1.0	—	—	—	6.0	4.0	3.0	2.0	—	—	69.0
2020 Chilean constitutional referendum.
17 Oct 2020	Activa		6.7	12.3	—	3.7	0.8	0.2	1.8	—	2.2	0.4	—	—	0.2	0.6	—	—	—	—	10.9	6.5	3.9	4.9	4.1	—	40.8
8 Oct 2020	Cadem		1.0	7.0	—	1.0	—	—	1.0	—	1.0	—	—	—	—	—	1.0	—	—	—	7.0	5.0	3.0	1.0	—	—	72.0
5 Oct 2020	Data Influye		6.4	16.1	—	2.6	1.5	1.2	1.6	—	1.6	0.9	—	—	—	1.9	0.6	—	0.6	—	12.6	9.2	5.1	2.9	1.4	1.8	32.0
2 Oct 2020	Cadem		1.0	8.0	—	1.0	—	—	1.0	—	—	—	—	—	—	1.0	1.0	—	—	—	8.0	7.0	3.0	2.0	—	—	67.0
30 Sept 2020	Criteria		3.0	17.0	—	6.0	1.0	—	2.0	—	1.0	1.0	—	—	—	1.0	—	—	1.0	—	18.0	8.0	6.0	3.0	1.0	—	31.0
28 Sept 2020	Activa		4.8	11.8	—	3.0	2.2	0.7	1.8	—	2.6	1.5	—	—	0.1	1.0	—	0.0	—	—	17.3	7.8	3.2	3.7	2.0	—	36.5
25 Sept 2020	Cadem		1.0	5.0	—	2.0	—	—	2.0	—	—	—	—	—	—	1.0	—	—	—	—	7.0	6.0	2.0	2.0	—	—	72.0
17 Sept 2020	Mori-Fiel		—	16.0	—	8.0	3.0	—	—	—	—	—	—	—	—	—	—	—	—	—	14.0	11.0	7.0	—	—	—	41.0
17 Sept 2020	Cadem		—	7.0	—	2.0	—	—	1.0	—	—	—	—	—	—	1.0	1.0	—	—	—	7.0	7.0	4.0	2.0	—	—	68.0
12 Sept 2020	Activa		3.0	11.0	—	3.5	1.2	1.6	2.0	—	2.4	0.3	—	—	0.1	1.1	—	0.1	—	—	15.0	7.3	3.4	5.1	3.4	—	39.5
10 Sept 2020	Cadem		—	8.0	—	2.0	—	—	2.0	—	—	—	—	—	—	1.0	—	—	—	—	7.0	5.0	3.0	2.0	—	1.0	69.0
31 Aug 2020	Criteria		3.0	16.0	—	5.0	2.0	—	2.0	—	1.0	1.0	—	—	—	2.0	—	—	1.0	—	15.0	8.0	7.0	4.0	1.0	—	32.0
29 Aug 2020	Activa		1.9	9.1	—	2.6	2.0	1.5	1.9	—	2.8	0.1	—	—	0.2	1.1	—	0.0	—	—	23.1	3.9	3.8	3.2	3.4	—	39.4
24 Aug 2020	Data Influye		3.3	15.7	—	3.1	1.9	1.9	1.5	—	1.7	—	—	—	—	2.6	—	—	1.3	—	13.3	1.8	5.3	3.4	1.6	2.7	38.9
15 Aug 2020	Activa		1.9	10.4	—	2.3	1.4	2.0	2.6	—	2.4	0.2	—	—	0.5	1.5	—	0.0	—	—	15.1	1.9	5.2	3.4	3.5	—	45.7
13 Aug 2020	Cadem		—	7.0	—	2.0	—	—	2.0	—	2.0	1.0	—	—	—	1.0	1.0	—	—	—	8.0	—	3.0	1.0	—	1.0	71.0
1 Aug 2020	Activa		1.6	11.3	—	2.3	1.9	1.6	3.3	—	0.7	0.6	—	—	1.4	1.2	—	—	—	—	17.5	0.5	2.8	5.7	1.8	—	45.8
31 Jul 2020	Criteria		2.0	12.0	—	6.0	2.0	3.0	2.0	—	1.0	—	—	—	—	2.0	—	—	2.0	—	13.0	2.0	6.0	5.0	2.0	—	40.0
26 Jul 2020	Data Influye		3.0	15.0	—	3.0	1.0	2.0	3.0	—	1.0	1.0	—	—	—	2.0	1.0	—	—	—	14.0	2.0	5.0	5.0	2.0	3.0	37.0
26 Jul 2020	Black&White		—	19.0	—	—	—	—	—	—	—	—	—	—	—	13.0	—	—	—	—	18.0	—	8.0	6.0	—	12.0	24.0
24 Jul 2020	Feedback		—	9.2	—	0.6	—	—	—	—	1.7	—	—	—	—	1.8	4.7	1.1	1.2	—	7.0	2.2	5.2	3.4	—	2.4	59.5
11 Jul 2020	Activa		3.0	6.7	—	3.3	2.1	1.0	4.3	—	0.4	1.0	—	—	0.1	2.3	—	0.1	—	—	13.3	0.7	2.7	5.0	6.7	2.8	44.5
10 Jul 2020	Cadem		—	6.0	—	1.0	—	—	2.0	—	—	1.0	—	—	—	1.0	1.0	—	—	—	7.0	—	2.0	2.0	—	1.0	76.0
30 Jun 2020	Criteria		2.0	12.0	—	7.0	2.0	2.0	1.0	—	1.0	1.0	—	—	—	3.0	—	—	2.0	—	12.0	2.0	8.0	5.0	3.0	4.0	33.0
28 Jun 2020	Activa		0.4	9.2	—	5.2	1.3	3.3	4.1	—	0.4	0.3	—	—	1.2	2.0	—	0.1	—	—	12.6	1.4	3.8	5.6	5.5	1.9	41.7
21 Jun 2020	Data Influye		1.0	9.0	—	3.0	—	1.0	3.0	—	1.0	1.0	—	—	—	2.0	1.0	—	—	—	12.0	3.0	4.0	4.0	2.0	8.0	45.0
13 Jun 2020	Activa		0.3	5.4	—	3.7	1.2	1.7	5.0	—	0.6	0.6	—	—	0.0	2.2	—	0.1	—	—	16.3	1.6	4.1	3.8	1.4	2.8	49.2
12 Jun 2020	Cadem		—	3.0	—	2.0	—	—	2.0	—	1.0	1.0	—	—	—	—	1.0	—	—	—	6.0	—	2.0	1.0	—	1.0	80.0
31 May 2020	Criteria		1.0	8.0	1.0	6.0	—	—	2.0	—	1.0	2.0	—	—	—	—	3.0	—	1.0	—	16.0	4.0	7.0	5.0	1.0	3.0	39.0
30 May 2020	Activa		0.8	3.3	—	4.2	1.9	2.1	5.3	—	0.1	1.2	—	—	—	—	2.1	0.8	—	—	17.3	2.2	3.4	5.5	1.9	0.6	47.3
24 May 2020	CELAG		—	12.9	—	10.4	—	—	—	—	—	—	—	—	—	—	—	—	—	—	18.8	—	4.1	10.3	—	—	43.5
Total lockdown imposed in Santiago Metropolitan Area and other large cities due to the COVID-19 pandemic.
14 May 2020	Cadem		—	3.0	—	3.0	—	—	2.0	—	—	1.0	—	—	—	—	1.0	—	—	—	7.0	—	2.0	2.0	—	—	79.0
12 May 2020	Activa		0.4	4.5	—	3.5	2.2	1.7	5.0	—	1.0	0.4	—	—	—	0.4	0.5	0.0	—	—	15.8	0.4	4.5	10.8	2.2	0.7	46.0
4 May 2020	Criteria		1.0	7.0	—	6.0	—	—	2.0	—	2.0	2.0	—	—	—	—	2.0	—	1.0	—	18.0	2.0	8.0	6.0	2.0	—	41.0
3 May 2020	Feedback		—	6.9	—	2.7	—	—	1.0	—	1.2	—	—	—	—	—	2.4	1.9	1.2	—	9.8	1.6	6.0	2.3	—	2.6	60.4
28 Apr 2020	Activa		1.3	5.9	—	3.7	1.1	1.2	3.0	—	0.3	0.3	—	—	0.1	0.0	1.5	0.4	—	—	19.8	1.7	2.4	5.4	3.1	0.1	48.7
9 Apr 2020	Cadem		—	3.0	—	2.0	—	—	3.0	—	1.0	1.0	—	—	—	—	1.0	—	—	—	10.0	—	3.0	2.0	—	—	74.0
9 Apr 2020	Activa		0.7	5.6	—	2.8	2.1	1.1	4.2	—	0.7	0.2	—	—	—	0.1	0.5	0.0	—	—	18.9	0.5	3.3	6.2	2.6	0.1	50.4
30 Mar 2020	Criteria		2.0	9.0	—	8.0	—	3.0	2.0	—	1.0	1.0	—	—	—	—	3.0	—	—	—	18.0	1.0	8.0	6.0	2.0	—	36.0
27 Mar 2020	Activa		1.3	4.5	—	4.4	1.1	1.7	3.7	—	0.7	0.5	—	—	0.2	—	1.1	0.2	—	—	11.5	0.4	5.7	8.2	2.1	0.2	52.5
26 Mar 2020	Feedback		—	5.3	—	—	—	—	1.0	—	1.2	—	—	—	—	—	1.5	1.8	1.1	—	10.9	—	6.6	3.1	—	2.1	65.4
16 Mar 2020	Data Influye		7.0	13.0	2.0	8.0	2.0	5.0	—	—	3.0	5.0	—	—	—	—	2.0	—	4.0	—	16.0	2.0	4.0	5.0	9.0	—	13.0
13 Mar 2020	Cadem		—	4.0	—	2.0	—	—	2.0	—	1.0	1.0	—	—	—	—	1.0	—	1.0	—	7.0	—	3.0	3.0	—	—	75.0
12 Mar 2020	Activa		0.6	3.1	—	6.3	0.6	1.6	3.8	—	0.5	0.5	—	—	0.0	—	0.6	0.0	—	—	13.8	0.9	4.7	7.9	7.4	—	47.7
First cases of COVID-19 are detected in the country.
29 Feb 2020	Criteria		2.0	6.0	—	6.0	—	3.0	5.0	—	2.0	2.0	—	—	—	—	3.0	—	1.0	—	15.0	1.0	10.0	7.0	2.0	—	35.0
28 Feb 2020	Activa		0.3	3.9	—	5.7	0.9	1.6	4.0	—	0.5	1.0	—	—	—	—	1.3	0.1	—	—	13.6	0.9	2.3	8.2	2.9	—	52.8
14 Feb 2020	Data Influye		7.0	14.0	2.0	6.0	2.0	6.0	—	—	4.0	8.0	—	—	—	—	2.0	—	4.0	—	15.0	2.0	3.0	5.0	7.0	—	13.0
14 Feb 2020	Cadem		—	3.0	—	2.0	—	—	2.0	—	1.0	1.0	—	—	—	—	2.0	—	—	—	4.0	—	4.0	4.0	—	—	77.0
13 Feb 2020	Activa		0.5	2.3	—	4.6	1.6	1.8	5.8	—	0.5	0.3	—	—	—	—	0.6	0.0	—	—	16.1	0.4	4.5	6.4	3.1	—	51.5
30 Jan 2020	Activa		0.8	5.4	—	5.9	1.6	0.9	2.8	—	0.4	0.3	—	—	—	—	1.7	0.3	—	—	15.3	0.2	6.1	9.9	5.6	—	42.8
28 Jan 2020	Criteria		1.0	6.0	2.0	7.0	2.0	2.0	2.0	—	2.0	1.0	—	—	—	—	3.0	—	1.0	—	14.0	1.0	8.0	8.0	2.0	—	38.0
17 Jan 2020	Cadem		—	3.0	—	3.0	—	—	2.0	—	—	1.0	—	—	—	—	2.0	—	0.0	—	4.0	—	3.0	3.0	—	—	79.0
16 Jan 2020	Activa		1.1	4.8	—	5.2	—	5.1	4.2	—	1.1	0.2	—	—	—	—	1.4	0.1	—	—	8.9	0.6	3.9	11.6	2.1	—	44.9
30 Dec 2019	Criteria		0.0	6.0	—	8.0	—	2.0	4.0	—	1.0	2.0	—	—	0.0	—	3.0	—	0.0	—	14.0	1.0	9.0	9.0	2.0	—	0.0
26 Dec 2019	Activa		0.6	6.3	—	5.2	2.1	0.3	2.7	—	2.8	0.3	—	—	0.0	—	0.5	—	0.0	—	12.1	0.5	6.7	7.5	2.6	—	39.0
20 Dec 2019	Cadem		0.0	3.0	—	3.0	—	—	1.0	—	—	1.0	—	—	0.0	—	2.0	—	1.0	—	5.0	—	5.0	5.0	1.0	—	49.8
29 Nov 2019	Cadem		0.0	2.0	—	4.0	—	—	2.0	—	1.0	1.0	—	—	0.0	—	2.0	—	0.0	—	6.0	—	2.0	5.0	1.0	—	73.0
26 Nov 2019	Activa		0.4	3.3	—	8.6	0.4	2.8	3.7	—	1.3	0.6	—	—	0.0	—	0.4	—	0.0	—	7.8	0.4	7.0	9.9	3.1	—	74.0
26 Nov 2019	Criteria		0.0	7.0	—	8.0	—	2.0	2.0	—	2.0	1.0	—	—	0.0	—	4.0	—	0.0	—	8.0	—	8.0	8.0	2.0	—	50.3
Agreement signed between different parties to held a referendum in 2020 to write a new Constitution.
30 Oct 2019	Cadem		0.0	3.0	—	5.0	—	—	2.0	—	1.0	—	—	—	1.0	—	3.0	—	0.0	—	6.0	—	2.0	1.0	—	—	48.0
30 Oct 2019	Activa		0.2	3.3	—	12.4	2.0	1.9	6.6	—	2.4	0.6	—	—	0.0	—	1.8	—	0.0	1.9	10.0	0.7	5.8	0.7	3.9	—	76.0
29 Oct 2019	Criteria		0.0	5.0	—	10.0	—	2.0	—	—	2.0	2.0	—	—	0.0	—	3.0	—	0.0	—	14.0	2.0	9.0	—	2.0	—	45.8
El Estallido Social: mass protests and riots all over the country.
11 Oct 2019	Cadem		0.0	3.0	—	6.0	—	—	5.0	—	1.0	1.0	—	—	0.0	—	2.0	—	0.0	—	11.0	—	5.0	—	—	—	49.0
30 Sept 2019	Criteria		0.0	4.0	—	14.0	3.0	2.0	6.0	—	—	—	—	—	0.0	—	4.0	—	0.0	5.0	17.0	2.0	12.0	—	—	—	66.0
25 Sept 2019	Activa		0.1	4.9	—	13.5	1.3	1.9	7.2	—	0.2	0.0	—	—	0.0	—	1.6	—	0.0	2.4	11.7	0.6	6.8	0.0	2.2	—	31.0
30 Aug 2019	Criteria		0.0	5.0	—	8.0	3.0	2.0	2.0	—	—	—	—	—	0.0	—	5.0	—	0.0	3.0	16.0	—	12.0	—	—	—	45.6
29 Aug 2019	Activa		—	4.5	—	9.0	1.6	2.6	7.2	—	0.3	0.2	—	—	0.0	—	4.9	—	0.0	2.8	16.9	1.3	7.0	0.7	3.2	—	44.0
29 Jul 2019	Criteria		0.0	6.0	—	11.0	2.0	2.0	5.0	—	—	—	—	—	0.0	—	4.0	—	0.0	5.0	16.0	2.0	10.0	—	—	—	37.8
25 Jul 2019	Activa		—	3.0	—	10.3	2.4	2.1	7.0	—	0.3	—	—	—	0.0	—	3.4	—	0.0	2.7	17.8	1.3	5.1	1.0	1.8	—	37.0
12 Jul 2019	Cadem		0.0	3.0	—	8.0	—	—	5.0	—	1.0	—	—	—	1.0	—	2.0	—	0.0	—	9.0	1.0	5.0	—	—	—	41.8
1 Jul 2019	Criteria		0.0	6.0	—	10.0	2.0	2.0	5.0	—	—	—	—	—	0.0	—	4.0	—	0.0	3.0	17.0	2.0	11.0	—	—	—	65.0
1 Jul 2019	Activa		0.0	5.0	—	14.3	3.0	2.0	7.9	—	0.8	—	—	—	0.0	—	3.7	—	0.0	2.5	11.4	1.1	7.6	0.9	0.8	—	38.0
3 Jun 2019	Criteria		0.0	6.0	—	13.0	2.0	3.0	5.0	—	—	—	—	—	0.0	—	5.0	—	0.0	4.0	11.0	2.0	9.0	—	—	—	39.0
31 May 2019	Activa		0.0	2.6	—	10.8	2.0	3.2	8.2	—	0.5	0.5	—	—	0.0	—	2.7	—	0.0	5.4	10.6	3.2	8.1	0.4	3.0	—	40.0
2 May 2019	Activa		0.3	2.2	—	11.1	4.0	3.0	8.5	—	1.2	0.5	—	—	0.0	—	3.9	—	0.0	3.9	7.5	0.7	11.2	0.5	3.1	—	38.8
28 Apr 2019	Criteria		0.0	5.0	—	12.0	3.0	3.0	5.0	—	—	—	—	—	0.0	—	5.0	—	0.0	5.0	10.0	2.0	10.0	—	—	—	38.4
31 Mar 2019	Criteria		0.0	3.0	—	12.0	—	—	6.0	—	—	—	—	—	0.0	—	5.0	—	0.0	8.0	9.0	2.0	10.0	—	—	—	40.0
31 Mar 2019	Activa		0.1	2.1	—	13.0	2.9	2.4	7.9	—	0.6	0.2	—	—	0.0	—	3.3	—	0.0	4.4	8.3	1.3	5.8	0.2	1.7	—	45.0
1 Mar 2019	Activa		0.0	2.6	—	14.6	5.6	1.8	6.9	—	0.7	0.1	—	—	0.0	—	2.6	—	0.0	3.6	6.8	2.3	9.1	0.4	3.0	—	45.8
28 Feb 2019	Criteria		0.0	3.0	—	12.0	2.0	4.0	4.0	—	—	—	—	—	0.0	—	6.0	—	0.0	5.0	9.0	3.0	11.0	—	—	—	39.9
31 Jan 2019	Criteria		0.0	3.0	—	12.0	3.0	2.0	3.0	—	—	—	—	—	0.0	—	4.0	—	0.0	5.0	8.0	2.0	10.0	—	—	—	41.0
31 Jan 2019	Activa		0.5	1.0	—	12.1	2.2	2.4	9.9	—	0.6	0.3	—	—	0.0	—	1.8	—	0.0	5.7	7.9	1.3	6.4	0.9	2.5	—	48.0
11 Jan 2019	Cadem		0.0	3.0	—	11.0	1.0	1.0	6.0	—	1.0	—	—	—	0.0	—	3.0	—	0.0	—	6.0	1.0	7.0	—	—	—	44.5
28 Dec 2018	Criteria		—	4.0	—	10.0	2.0	2.0	3.0	—	—	—	—	—	—	—	5.0	—	—	4.0	6.0	3.0	12.0	—	—	—	0.0
30 Nov 2018	Criteria		—	4.0	—	12.0	3.0	5.0	3.0	—	—	—	—	—	—	—	4.0	—	—	3.0	5.0	2.0	8.0	—	—	—	45.0
3 Nov 2018	Criteria		—	2.0	—	11.0	2.0	3.0	4.0	—	2.0	—	—	—	—	—	5.0	—	—	2.0	3.0	4.0	8.0	—	—	—	49.0
2 Oct 2018	Criteria		—	3.0	—	10.0	3.0	3.0	1.0	—	—	—	—	—	—	—	6.0	—	—	5.0	4.0	2.0	9.0	—	—	—	51.0
31 Aug 2018	Criteria		—	—	—	14.0	3.0	4.0	3.0	—	—	—	—	—	—	—	5.0	—	—	4.0	5.0	3.0	7.0	—	—	—	51.0
30 Jul 2018	Criteria		—	—	—	20.0	4.0	6.0	7.0	—	—	—	—	—	—	—	5.0	—	—	5.0	6.0	5.0	7.0	—	—	—	50.0
28 Jun 2018	Criteria		—	—	—	16.0	6.0	6.0	4.0	—	—	—	—	—	—	—	8.0	—	—	7.0	2.0	2.0	10.0	—	—	—	31.0
23 May 2018	Criteria		—	—	—	16.0	3.0	5.0	—	—	—	—	—	—	—	—	5.0	—	—	5.0	2.0	—	14.0	—	—	—	35.0
12 Apr 2018	Criteria		—	—	—	22.0	4.0	4.0	—	—	—	—	—	—	—	—	6.0	—	—	5.0	3.0	—	10.0	—	—	—	48.0

== Second round ==
Results considering only official candidates (excluding "Other", "Don't know", "Do not vote", etc.) and general voters, excluding polls only with likely voters. Average of polls every 3 days.

Date	Polling firm	Type of poll	Boric (CS)	J.A. Kast (PLR)	Not voting	Not sure
15-16 Dec 2021	Cadem	Base 100	55	45		
1-4 Dec 2021	AtlasIntel		41.0	38.7	20.3	
30 Nov-4 Dec 2021	Activa		42.2	28.3	13.5	16.0
30 Nov-2 Dec 2021	Feedback		45	39	14	2
30 Nov-2 Dec 2021	Cadem		40	35	25	
26–29 Nov 2021	Studio Público		45.0	45.3	9.7	
25–29 Nov 2021	Data Influye		47	34	12	7
25–29 Nov 2021	Criteria	Base 100	54	46	—	
26-27 Nov 2021	Black & White		44	41	4	10
24-26 Nov 2021	Cadem		39	33	28	
23-26 Nov 2021	Activa	Likely voter (55.8%)	53.9	31.2	5.1	9.8
23-26 Nov 2021	Activa		40.4	24.5	12.8	22.5
20 Nov 2021	Cadem	Online panel	39	39	22	
16-19 Nov 2021	Cadem		37	33	30	
9-12 Nov 2021	Activa		35.9	35.0	21.9	7.2
5–6 Nov 2021	AtlasIntel		36.3	40.7	23.0	
2–4 Nov 2021	Cadem		40	44	11	5
3 Nov 2021	UDD		33	33	34	
1–2 Nov 2021	AtlasIntel		36.7	42.6	20.7	
29 Oct–2 Nov 2021	Feedback	Likely voter (48%)	41.2	48.7	10.1	
26–31 Oct 2021	Studio Publico		46.8	53.2	—	
25–29 Oct 2021	Activa	Likely voter	42.9	36.8	4.2	16.1
25–29 Oct 2021	Activa		32.9	32.8	12.5	12.1
20–26 Oct 2021	La Cosa Nostra		46	54	—	—
12–15 Oct 2021	Activa	Likely voter	52.6	30.2	11.2	6.0
12–15 Oct 2021	Activa		39.5	28.1	22.7	9.7
13–14 Oct 2021	Cadem		43	35	16	6
5–7 Oct 2021	UDD		37	29	34	
27 Sep–1 Oct 2021	Activa	Likely voter	47.1	28.3	16.5	8.1
27 Sep–1 Oct 2021	Activa		35.7	25.8	26.9	11.6
14–16 Sep 2021	Cadem		50	27	17	6
1–3 Sep 2021	Cadem		53	27	15	5

=== Discarded pairings ===
Some polls evaluated a potential second round between candidates that participated in the first round of elections

Date	Polling firm	Type of poll	Boric (CS)	Sichel (I-ChV)	Not voting	Not sure
15 Oct 2021	Activa	Likely voter	49.4	28.5	14.7	7.4
15 Oct 2021	Activa		37.6	24.6	26.7	11.1
14 Oct 2021	Cadem		41	35	18	6
7 Oct 2021	UDD		37	26	37	
1 Oct 2021	Activa	Likely voter	43.9	31.2	16.3	8.6
1 Oct 2021	Activa		33.4	28.0	27.0	11.6
16 Sept 2021	Feedback	Likely voter	43	44	10	3
16 Sept 2021	Feedback		37	43	18	2
16 Sept 2021	Cadem		44	36	15	5
3 Sept 2021	Cadem		44	39	13	4
25 Aug 2021	UDD		31	30	30	9
30 Jul 2021	Feedback	Likely voter	48	40	11	1
30 Jul 2021	Feedback		41	44	13	2
23 Jul 2021	Cadem		46	42	8	4

Date	Polling firm	Type of poll	Boric (CS)	Provoste (PDC)	Not voting	Not sure
15 Oct 2021	Activa	Likely voter	38.6	30.8	23.0	7.6
15 Oct 2021	Activa		31.3	25.8	11.4	31.4
14 Oct 2021	Cadem		39	35	21	5
1 Oct 2021	Activa	Likely voter	39.6	26.1	25.7	8.6
1 Oct 2021	Activa		30.9	22.7	33.7	12.7
16 Sept 2021	Feedback	Likely voter	43	25	29	2
16 Sept 2021	Feedback		36	24	38	2
16 Sept 2021	Cadem		42	34	18	6
3 Sept 2021	Cadem		44	34	16	6
25 Aug 2021	UDD		31.2	24.0	37.9	6.9
30 Jul 2021	Feedback	Likely voter	47	24	28	1
30 Jul 2021	Feedback		41	24	34	1
23 Jul 2021	Cadem		46	34	14	6
24 Jun 2021	Cadem		25	40	30	5

Date	Polling firm	Type of poll	Provoste (PDC)	Sichel (I-ChV)	Not voting	Not sure
14 Oct 2021	Cadem		40	35	20	5
16 Sept 2021	Feedback	Likely voter	30	44	24	2
16 Sept 2021	Feedback		29	43	26	2
16 Sept 2021	Cadem		40	36	18	6
3 Sept 2021	Cadem		38	42	16	4
25 Aug 2021	UDD		27.1	32.8	33.1	7.0
30 Jul 2021	Feedback	Likely voter	37	41	21	1
30 Jul 2021	Feedback		30	45	24	1
23 Jul 2021	Cadem		36	45	13	6
24 Jun 2021	Cadem		39	32	24	5

Date	Polling firm	Type of poll	Provoste (PDC)	J.A. Kast (PLR)	Not voting	Not sure
14 Oct 2021	Cadem		44	36	15	5

Date	Polling firm	Type of poll	Sichel (I-ChV)	J.A. Kast (PLR)	Not voting	Not sure
14 Oct 2021	Cadem		30	34	28	8

Some polls included candidates that eventually announced they would not run for office.

Date	Polling firm	Jadue (PC)	F. Kast (EVO)	Not voting	Not sure
8 Jan 2021	Cadem	31	24	29	16
18 Nov 2020	Cadem	35	24	25	6
30 Oct 2020	Cadem	32	26	32	7

Date	Polling firm	Jiles (PH)	F. Kast (EVO)	Not voting	Not sure
18 Nov 2020	Cadem	40	22	27	11
30 Oct 2020	Cadem	46	24	25	5

Date	Polling firm	Jadue (PC)	J.A. Kast (PLR)	Not voting	Not sure
8 Jan 2021	Cadem	31	21	32	16
18 Nov 2020	Cadem	36	23	34	7
30 Oct 2020	Cadem	33	20	32	15

Date	Polling firm	Jiles (PH)	J.A.Kast (PLR)	Not voting	Not sure
18 Nov 2020	Cadem	42	20	25	13
30 Oct 2020	Cadem	47	21	27	5

Date	Polling firm	Jadue (PC)	Lavín (UDI)	Not voting	Not sure
24 Jun 2021	Cadem	32	39	23	6
20 May 2021	Cadem	35	37	25	3
8 Apr 2021	Cadem	30	46	19	5
18 Mar 2021	UDD	28.9	32.8	38.3	
8 Jan 2021	Cadem	25	37	26	12
18 Nov 2020	Cadem	32	36	26	6
30 Oct 2020	Cadem	28	33	26	13

Date	Polling firm	Jiles (PH)	Lavín (UDI)	Not voting	Not sure
18 Nov 2020	Cadem	35	35	22	8
30 Oct 2020	Cadem	36	36	23	5

Date	Polling firm	Muñoz (PPD)	Lavín (UDI)	Not voting	Not sure
18 Nov 2020	Cadem	19	35	38	8
30 Oct 2020	Cadem	22	32	31	15

Date	Polling firm	Narváez (PS)	Lavín (UDI)	Not voting	Not sure
18 Mar 2021	UDD	12.4	31.1	56.5	

Date	Polling firm	Rincón (PDC)	Lavín (UDI)	Not voting	Not sure
18 Nov 2020	Cadem	22	35	36	7
30 Oct 2020	Cadem	23	33	31	13

Date	Polling firm	Sánchez (I-FA)	Lavín (UDI)	Not voting	Not sure
18 Nov 2020	Cadem	30	36	28	6
30 Oct 2020	Cadem	31	34	25	10

Date	Polling firm	Vidal (PPD)	Lavín (UDI)	Not voting	Not sure
18 Nov 2020	Cadem	21	33	39	7
30 Oct 2020	Cadem	24	31	31	14

Date	Polling firm	Jadue (PC)	Matthei (UDI)	Not voting	Not sure
18 Mar 2021	UDD	29.1	29.1	41.8	
8 Jan 2021	Cadem	27	36	25	12
18 Nov 2020	Cadem	35	34	25	6
30 Oct 2020	Cadem	29	32	26	13

Date	Polling firm	Jiles (PH)	Matthei (UDI)	Not voting	Not sure
18 Nov 2020	Cadem	38	33	20	9
30 Oct 2020	Cadem	44	32	23	5

Date	Polling firm	Narváez (PS)	Matthei (UDI)	Not voting	Not sure
18 Mar 2021	UDD	12.7	27.5	59.8	

Date	Polling firm	Jadue (PC)	Sichel (I-ChV)	Not voting	Not sure
18 Mar 2021	UDD	29	24.9	46.1	
8 Jan 2021	Cadem	25	30	27	17
18 Nov 2020	Cadem	31	35	27	7
30 Oct 2020	Cadem	29	20	33	18

Date	Polling firm	Jiles (PH)	Sichel (I-ChV)	Not voting	Not sure
18 Nov 2020	Cadem	40	36	19	5

Date	Polling firm	Narváez (PS)	Sichel (I-ChV)	Not voting	Not sure
18 Mar 2021	UDD	15.9	26.3	57.8	

== See also ==
- President of Chile
- Opinion polling for the 2025 Chilean presidential election
