= 2021 Chilean presidential primaries =

Presidential primary of Chile Vamos, 2021
| ← 2017 | 18 July 2021 | 2025 → |
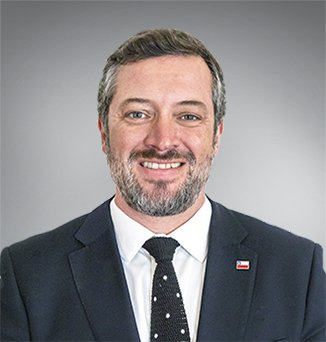

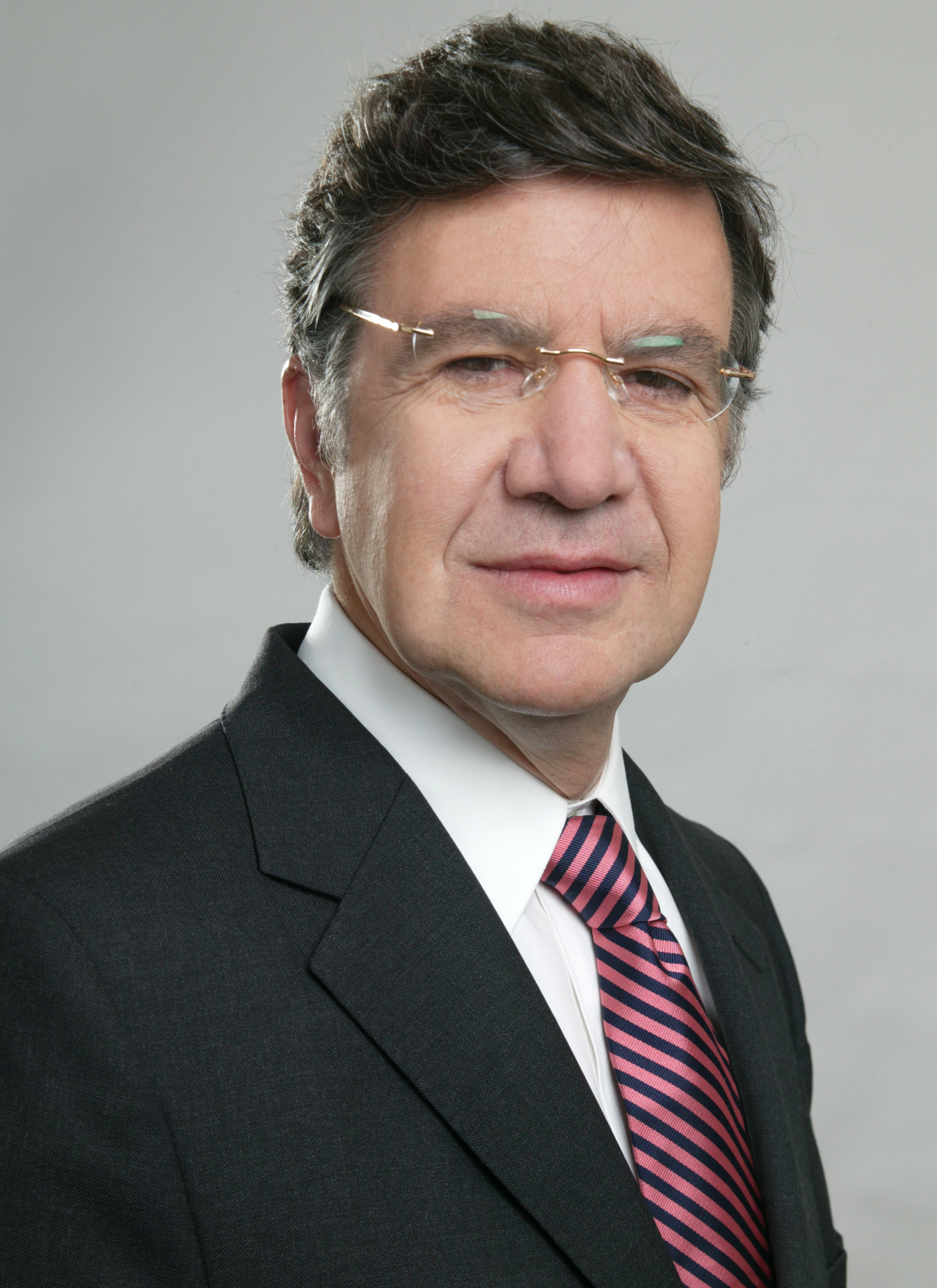

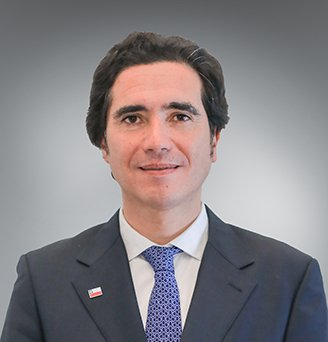

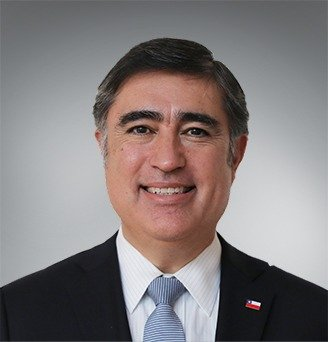
| Candidate | Sebastián Sichel | Joaquín Lavín | Ignacio Briones |
| Party | Independent | UDI | Evópoli |
| Alliance | Chile Vamos | Chile Vamos | Chile Vamos |
| Popular vote | 660,250 | 416,604 | 131,996 |
| Percentage | 49.26% | 31.08% | 9.85% |
| Candidate | Mario Desbordes |
| Party | National Renewal |
| Alliance | Chile Vamos |
| Popular vote | 131,622 |
| Percentage | 9.82% |
Chile Vamos nominee
Sebastián Sichel

Presidential primary of Apruebo Dignidad, 2021
| ← 2017 | 18 July 2021 |
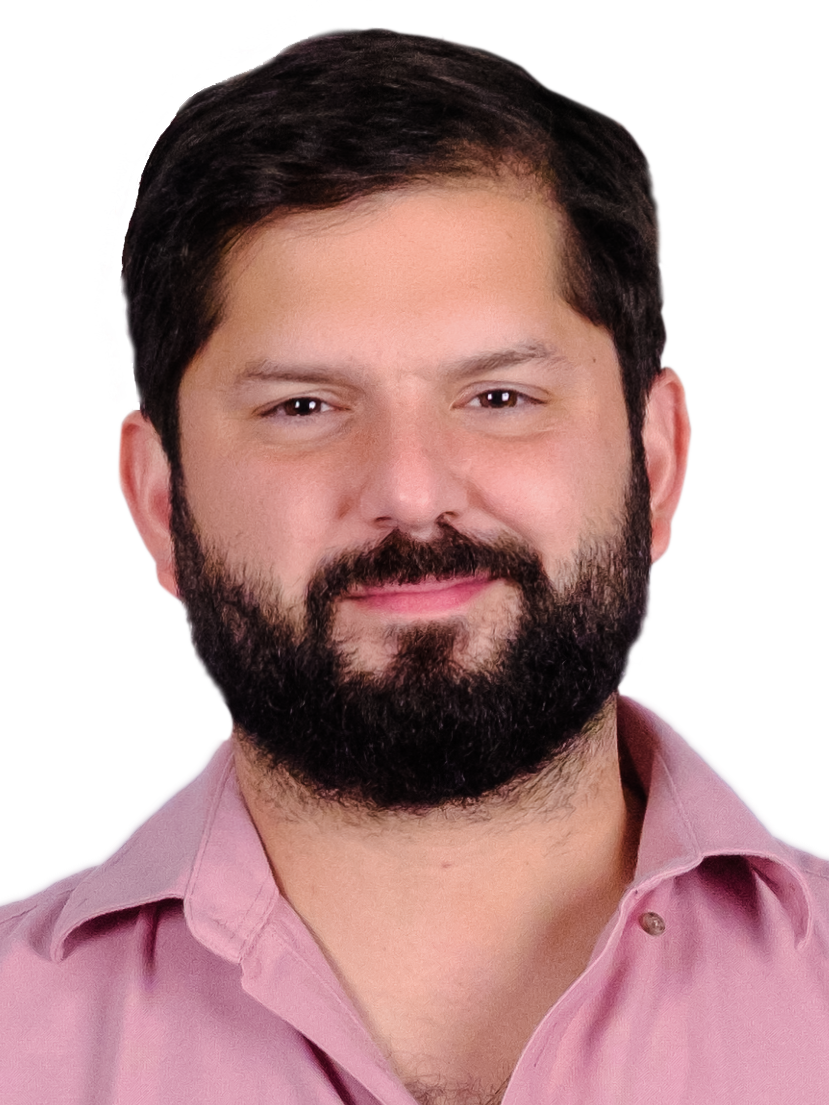

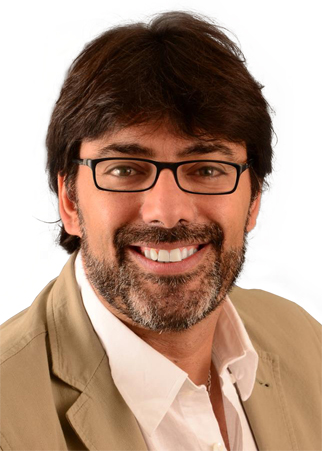
| Candidate | Gabriel Boric | Daniel Jadue |
| Party | Social Convergence | Communist |
| Alliance | Apruebo Dignidad | Apruebo Dignidad |
| Popular vote | 1,059,060 | 693,862 |
| Percentage | 60.42% | 39.58% |
Apruebo Dignidad nominee
Gabriel Boric

The Chilean presidential primaries of 2021 were held in Chile on Sunday 18 July 2021. According to the law, primaries are voluntary, but its results are binding. Two political coalitions decided to participate: Former minister Sebastián Sichel won the Chile Vamos primary with 49% of the vote, while deputy Gabriel Boric became the Apruebo Dignidad nominee with 60%.

The Constituent Unity coalition decided not to participate. The presidential election was held on Sunday 21 November 2021.

== Primary results ==
| Ballot number | Candidate | Party | Votes | % | Result |
(A) Chile Vamos primary
| 1 | Joaquín Lavín | Independent Democratic Union | 416,604 | 31.08 | |
| 2 | Ignacio Briones | Evópoli | 131,996 | 9.85 | |
| 3 | Sebastián Sichel | Independent | 660,250 | 49.26 | Chile Vamos candidate |
| 4 | Mario Desbordes | National Renewal | 131,622 | 9.82 | |
| | Total valid votes | | 1,340,472 | 100.00 | |
(B) Apruebo Dignidad primary
| 5 | Gabriel Boric | Social Convergence | 1,059,060 | 60.42 | Apruebo Dignidad candidate |
| 6 | Daniel Jadue | Communist Party | 693,862 | 39.58 | |
| | Total valid votes | | 1,752,922 | 100.00 | |
| | Total valid votes | | 3,093,394 | 98.47 | |
| | Null votes | | 41,930 | 1.33 | |
| | Blank votes | | 6,080 | 0.19 | |
| | Total votes | | 3,141,404 | 100.00 | |
| | Eligible voters | | 14,693,433 | 21.38% turnout | |

Source: Tricel.

| Preceded by — | Apruebo Dignidad presidential primary 2021 | Succeeded by 2025 Unity for Chile presidential primary |
