= Chile Vamos =

Chilean political coalition

Let's go Chile Chile Vamos
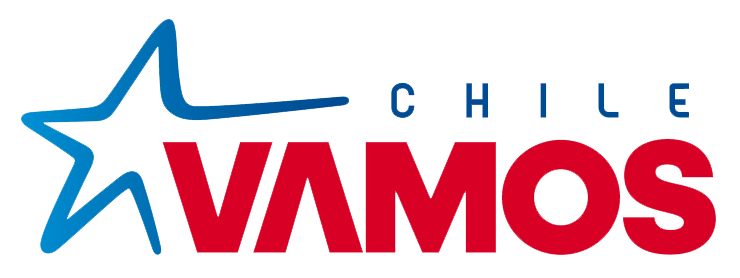
- Leader: Evelyn Matthei
- Founded: 29 January 2015; 11 years ago
- Preceded by: Alliance
- Headquarters: Santiago de Chile
- Ideology: Conservatism; Liberal conservatism Economic liberalism
- Political position: Centre-right to right-wing
- International affiliation: International Democrat Union
- Senate: 24 / 50
- Chamber of Deputies: 53 / 155
- Mayors: 144 / 345

Website
- www.chilevamos.cl

Chile Vamos (Spanish for "Let's go Chile") is a centre-right to right-wing political coalition of three political parties in Chile. The coalition was created on 29 January 2015 by the general secretaries of the Independent Democrat Union (UDI), National Renewal (RN), Democratic Independent Regionalist Party (PRI) and Political Evolution (Evópoli).

For the 2021 parliamentary election, the coalition was renamed Chile Podemos Más (stylized Chile Podemos +, Spanish for "Chile we can (do) more").

== History ==
On August 2, 2014, during the National Council of National Renewal in Santiago, the party chairman Cristián Monckeberg called his group together with the UDI and then political movement Evópoli to refound the Alliance under the name Coalition for Freedom. Negotiations were also held with the Independent Regionalist Party so that it would join the coalition, which concluded in December 2014 with the creation of a new coalition agreed to contest the municipal elections of 2016, and the presidential, parliamentary and regional councilors elections of 2017.

The new coalition was made official on January 29, 2015, and the process of finding a name for the new referent began.

In August 2015, the four member parties agreed to submit two lists for the election of councilors in 2016: one consisting of RN and UDI, and the other composed of the PRI and Evópoli. The same month, the name "Levantemos" ("Let's get up") emerged as the name that generated greater consensus within the coalition as its mark. However, the name was challenged by the NGO Desafío Levantemos Chile, which objected to similarities with its own name and logo. The opposition bloc responded that the name of the coalition was not yet formalized and that "Levantemos" was only one of the options to consider. The name "Chile Vamos" was decided on 4 October 2015.

Following the election of Sebastián Sichel as the coalition's candidate during the 2021 presidential primaries, Chile Vamos has been considering changing the name of the coalition, with most suggestions revolving around Sichel's campaign slogan "Se puede" (It is possible). On August 20, 2021, the name of the coalition was officially changed to "Chile Podemos Más" ("Chile can do more").

=== Frictions ===
The impact of the 2019-20 Chilean protests and the management of the COVID-19 pandemic led to a series of differences and frictions between the different parties of Chile Vamos.

In late 2019, UDI froze for a few months their membership with the coalition because of major disagreements with some policies of their fellow parties.

=== Vamos por Chile ===
For the 2021 Constitutional Convention election, Chile Vamos and the Republican Party agreed to participate in a joint list called Vamos por Chile (Spanish for "Let's go for Chile") as a way to ensure the combined list could secure the third of seats needed in the Constitutional Convention to veto proposals to be included in the new Constitution of Chile.

The single list, however, had the worst electoral result for any right-wing alliance since the reestablishment of democracy in Chile. Vamos por Chile got 20% of the votes and only 37 of the 155 seats in the Convention.

== Composition ==
Party	Spanish	Leader
Independent Democratic Union	Unión Demócrata Independiente	Hernán Larraín
National Renewal	Renovacion Nacional	Cristián Monckeberg
Political Evolution	Evolución Política	Felipe Kast
Democratic Independent Regionalist Party	Partido Regionalista Independiente Demócrata	Alejandra Bravo

=== Political council ===
The coalition has a political council with 47 members: 16 independents, 10 from National Renewal, 10 from the Independent Democratic Union, 6 from Political Evolution and 5 from the Independent Regionalist Party.

- Independent Democratic Union:
  - Guillermo Ramírez
  - María José Hoffmann
  - Juan Antonio Coloma
  - Patricio Melero
  - Jaime Bellolio
  - Edmundo Eluchans
  - Jorge Castro
  - Francisco de la Maza
  - Andrés Chadwick
- Political Evolution:
  - Jorge Saint-Jean
  - Andrés Molina
  - Lorena Recabarren
  - Felipe Morandé
  - Pedro Pablo Errázuriz
  - Luciano Cruz-Coke
- National Renewal:
  - Mario Desbordes
  - Andrés Allamand
  - Alberto Espina
  - Manuel José Ossandón
  - Carlos Larraín
  - Nicolás Monckeberg
  - Francisco Chahuán
  - Felipe Guevara
  - José Miguel Arellano
  - Sergio Romero Pizarro
- Democratic Independent Regionalist Party:
  - Eduardo Salas
  - Hugo Ortiz de Filippi
  - Yuri Olivares
  - Mario González Rubio
  - Alejandro Fuentes
- Independents:
  - Sebastián Piñera
  - Soledad Arellano
  - Rosanna Costa
  - Karin Ebensperger
  - Ximena Rivas
  - Vicente Alti
  - Hugo Herrera
  - Julio Isamit
  - Sebastián Keitel
  - Felipe Larraín
  - Nicolás León
  - Carlos Llancaqueo
  - Pablo Ortúzar
  - Ricardo Sande
  - José Villagrán
  - Rosita Díaz

== See also ==
- List of political parties in Chile
- New Majority (Chile)
- 2017 Chilean general election
