= Mario Desbordes =

Chilean politician

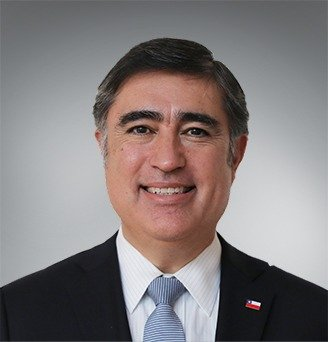

Mayor of Santiago
- Incumbent
- Assumed office 6 December 2024
- Preceded by: Irací Hassler

Minister of Defense
- In office 20 July 2020 – 18 December 2020
- President: Sebastián Piñera
- Preceded by: Alberto Espina
- Succeeded by: Baldo Prokurica

Member of the Chamber of Deputies
- In office 11 March 2018 – 28 July 2020
- Preceded by: Creation of the charge
- Succeeded by: Camilo Morán
- Constituency: District 8

President of National Renewal
- In office 10 March 2018 – 20 July 2021
- Preceded by: Cristián Monckeberg
- Succeeded by: Francisco Chahuán

Personal details
- Born: 15 October 1968 (age 57) Santiago, Chile
- Party: National Renewal (2000–2026)
- Education: Universidad La República
- Occupation: Politician
- Profession: Lawyer; Police officer

Mario Guillermo Desbordes Jiménez (born 15 October 1968) is a Chilean politician and former police officer of Carabineros de Chile, currently serving as the mayor of the commune of Santiago. He also was Minister of Defense (2020–2021).

Desbordes previously served as a member of the Chamber of Deputies in Congress and was the president of National Renewal from 2018 to 2020. He also held the position of Secretary-General of his political party from 2010 to 2018 and was Undersecretary of Investigations during President Sebastián Piñera's first administration.

In July 2021, Desbordes finished last in a four-way primary for the Chile Vamos coalition, ending his bid for the presidency. Then, in 2024, he was elected as mayor of Santiago Centro.

== Biography ==
Born in 1968, Desbordes spent part of his childhood in Los Andes, his native town.

Then, he moved to Santiago, Chile's capital city, where he lived in La Cisterna commune until 1986.

He completed his elementary school education at E–556 public school of that commune, and finished the high school at A–109 Lycée in El Bosque commune.

== Political career ==
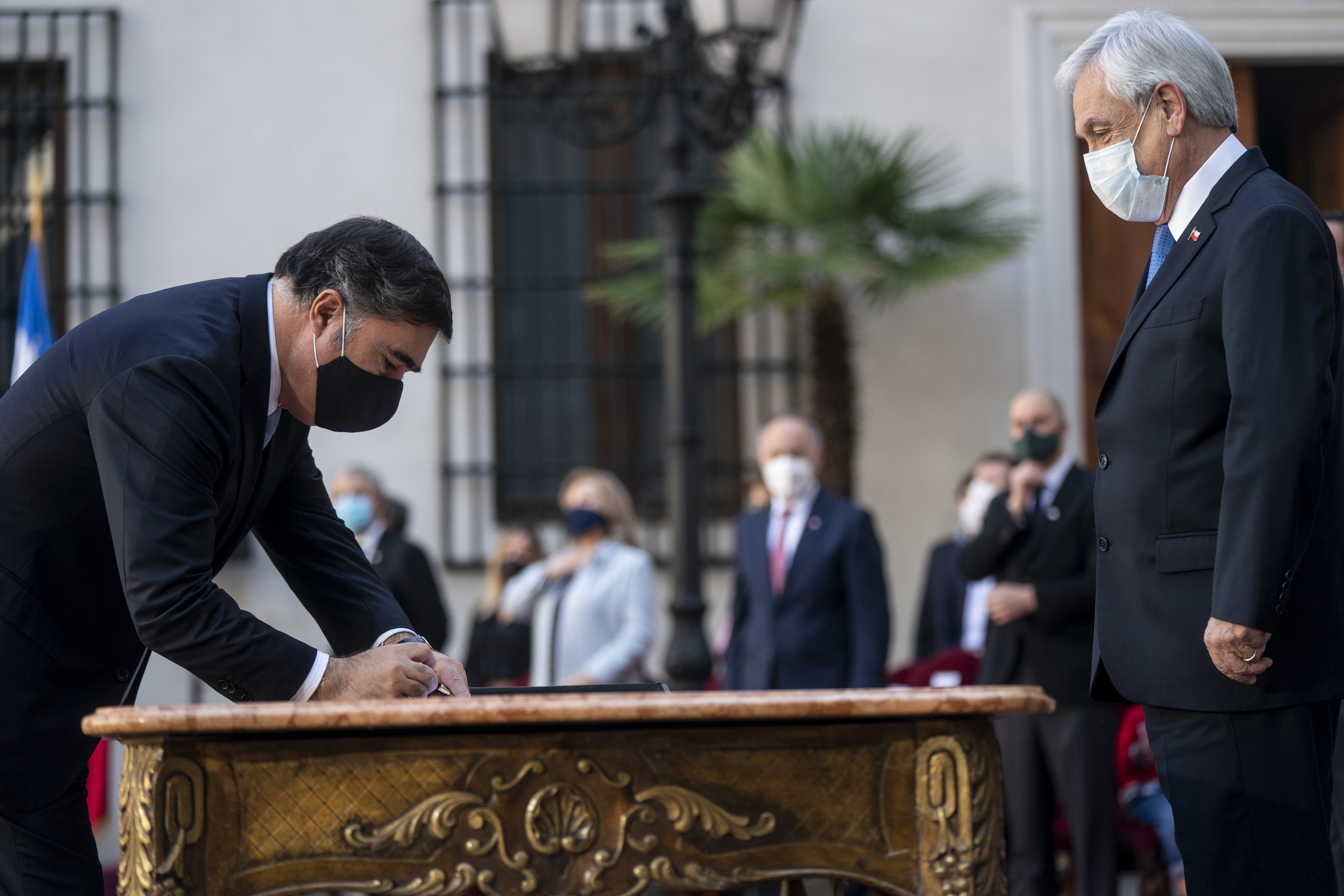
Mario Desbordes signs in front of President Sebastián Piñera the decree which names him Minister of Defense of Chile in July 2020.

In 2000, he joined the party National Renewal.

In 2010, Desbordes became RN's General Secretary after a caretaker period of Cecilia Pérez, who replaced him until he finished his services as Undersecretary of Invesgation on 23 November.

On 9 January 2020, he participated on a seminar about characteristics and the future of the Chilean right-wing alongside Jacqueline van Rysselberghe and Hernán Larraín Matte.

On 12 March 2020, it was reported by Interferencia newspaper that Desbordes received threats from libertarian far-right leader Sebastián Izquierdo, who called him as a «coward rightist».

On 28 July 2020, he resigned to his charge of deputy after accepting the proposal of the President Piñera about appointing him as Minister of Defense of Chile.

On 23 January 2021, he was proclaimed by his party as candidate for the primaries presidential elections of the coalition. On 18 July, he was defeated after finishing in the last place (fourth) behind Ignacio Briones (Evópoli), Joaquín Lavín (UDI) and Sebastián Sichel (Independent).

In March 2026, he resigned from his membership in National Renewal due to differences with the party leadership.

== Political thought ==
He has declared being a social christian. Similarly, he has as his references to Angela Merkel or the Spanish Popular Party politics.

On more than one occasion he has been critical to the subsidiary positions from allies or key leaders of the party Independent Democratic Union (UDI), like ―for example― the independent economist Cristián Larroulet or the senator van Rysselberghe (UDI).

According to French sociologist Stéphanie Alenda, the reason of these frictions have relation with the «solidarity» endorsed by Desbordes' social right. These differences have stirred up criticism from politicians of his own party like Carlos Larraín and Andrés Allamand, both from RN's conservative factions which have opined that Desbordes would leading to the party towards left-wing politics because two reasons: 1) his support to a new constitution, and 2) his coincidence with positions of the Humanist Party respect to the retirement of AFP's 10% funds.

One of Desbordes' intellectual referents is the philosopher Hugo Eduardo Herrera, who ―however― doesn't recognize himself as Desbordes' theoretician.

== Personal life ==
He is fan of Colo-Colo, most successful team in the history of football in Chile.
