= Emilia Ríos =

Chilean politician

Mayor of Ñuñoa
- In office 28 June 2021 – 15 November 2024
- Preceded by: Andrés Zahri
- Succeeded by: Sebastián Sichel

Councilwoman of Ñuñoa
- In office 6 December 2016 – 28 June 2021

Personal details
- Born: 20 May 1988 (age 38) Santiago, Chile
- Party: Democratic Revolution
- Education: Pontifical Catholic University of Chile (BA, Political Sciences); University of Chile (MA, Public administration)
- Occupation: Politician
- Profession: Political scientist Public administrator

Cristina Emilia Ríos Saavedra (born 20 May 1988) is a Chilean politician who served as mayor of Ñuñoa between 2021 and 2024.
