= Daniel Jadue =

Chilean politician

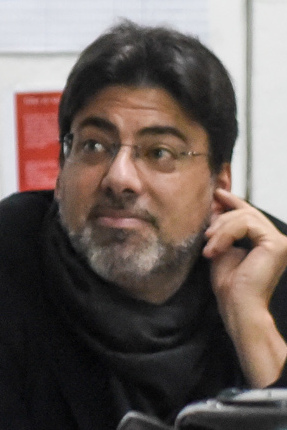

Mayor of Recoleta
- In office 6 December 2012 – 3 June 2024
- Preceded by: Sol Letelier González
- Succeeded by: Gianinna Repetti Lara (interim)

Personal details
- Born: Óscar Daniel Jadue Jadue; 28 June 1967 (age 59) Santiago, Chile
- Party: Communist (since 1993)
- Other political affiliations: Popular Front for the Liberation of Palestine (1988–1993)
- Education: University of Chile; Catholic University of the North
- Occupation: Architect, sociologist, politician
- Website: danieljadue.cl (in Spanish)

Óscar Daniel Jadue Jadue (born 28 June 1967) is a Chilean architect, sociologist and Marxist politician. (Note: Starting from his respect to party's principles, Jadue has also explicitly said that he adheres to Marx's theory on the alienation of capitalism, system that ―according him― generates poverty.) A member of the Communist Party of Chile (PCCh), Jadue served as Mayor of Recoleta since 2012 until his dismissal on July 22, 2024.

A Chilean of Palestinian Christian descent, Jadue originally became involved in politics as a Palestinian independence activist. From 1987 to 1991, Jadue served as president of General Union of Palestinian Students. During his career, Jadue has worked as a commercial architect, policy advisor, and scholar. After multiple unsuccessful attempts to achieve elected office, Jadue was elected to govern Recoleta, a commune in the Santiago Metropolitan Region, in 2012. In this capacity, he has presided over the creation of "people's pharmacies", a series of municipal-run drugstores to provide patients with affordable medication.

Jadue was a candidate in the presidential primaries for Apruebo Dignidad, in which he was defeated by Gabriel Boric.

On 3 June 2024, Judge Paulina Moya Jiménez ordered the preventive detention of Jadue in connection with a criminal complaint filed by businessman Álvaro Castro, owner of Best Quality Products SpA. The complaint, directed against the Asociación Chilena de Farmacias Populares (Achifarp) and Jadue in his capacity as mayor of Recoleta, alleged a multimillion‑peso debt arising from the 2020 sale of N95 masks, gloves, and thermometers to Achifarp. On 2 September 2024, the Tercer Juzgado de Garantía revoked the preventive detention measure, citing recommendations from the Inter-American Court of Human Rights, according to Judge Paula Brito. After 91 days in custody at the Anexo Capitán Yáber facility, Jadue was released and placed under house arrest for the remainder of the investigation.

== Early life and education ==
Daniel Jadue was born in Recoleta, Santiago to small business owners Magaly del Carmen Jadue Jadue and Juan Fariz Jadue Jadue. He was estranged from his father, a supporter of Augusto Pinochet, for most of his life. Jadue is the grandson of Christian Palestinian immigrants who arrived in Chile during the first half of the last century. He is also a second-degree cousin of the Chilean soccer referee Sergio Jadue.

He graduated from the University of Chile with degrees in sociology and architecture. He has a degree in total quality management from Catholic University of the North, a master's degree in urban planning, and a specialist degree in social housing, also from the University of Chile.

== Private career ==
Jadue has specialized in community management for the last 15 years. He has a vast professional career linked to local development management and local governments. He has been project manager for community development plans and participatory regulatory plans in several Chilean communes. He has also carried out research on quality of life, gender, youth crime, employment and poverty in cities in Latin America and Europe. He has participated with presentations in international seminars on quality of life, gender, housing and social Comptroller's office. He was a professor at the Architecture and Urban Sociology Workshop at the Faculty of Architecture and Urbanism of the University of Chile.

In the architectural field, he was project manager in several public works such as the Municipality of Pichilemu, the Estación Central Cultural Center, the Pedro Aguirre Cerda House of Culture, the Fort of Purén Historical Park and the headquarters of the Union of Supervisors of Chuquicamata mine.

He was an advisor to the Chuquicamata unions on issues related to the process of transformation of Chuquicamata into an exclusive industrial zone and to some unions in the field of salmon farms in the Los Lagos Region in the preparation of their collective bargaining.

For more than five years, he was a panelist for the talk show El Termómetro on Chilevisión and participated in a political analysis program every Friday on Radio Nuevo Mundo. He is a frequent panelist for analysis of international politics on international television stations such as TeleSur, RT, HispanTV and NTN24. He is also a columnist for El Mostrador and Radio Cooperativa.

== Early political career ==
His political career began within Palestinian organizations linked to the Palestine Liberation Organization during the 1980s. He was president of the General Union of Palestinian Students between 1987 and 1991 and general coordinator of the Palestinian Youth Organization of Latin America and the Caribbean between 1991 and 1993. He joined the Communist Party of Chile in 1993, a day after the signing of the Oslo I Accord. He was secretary of the Directorate of Communist Students and candidate for the University of Chile Student Federation in 1996.

He unsuccessfully ran for Congress in 2001 and 2005. He was also a twice-unsuccessful candidate for Mayor of Recoleta in 2004 and 2008. He is currently a member of the Central Committee of the Communist Party of Chile.

Since 2003 he has been President of the La Chimba social and cultural development center in Recoleta (Centro de Desarrollo Social y Cultural La Chimba, de Recoleta), which has maintained, popular high schools, legal assistance, and a system of free professional operations for the neighborhood councils of the Recoleta commune since 2006. The La Chimba center also develops a constant work of popular education for democracy, the empowerment of social leaders and environmental sustainability.

== Mayoralty of Recoleta ==
=== 2012 election ===
In 2012, Jadue's candidacy for Mayor of Recoleta was supported by left-wing electoral coalition Por un Chile Justo (For a Fair Chile). As a candidate for mayor, he committed himself to a "citizen and participatory local government program" adhering to the citizen initiative of VotaPrograma, a program that is currently under development thanks to the participation of more than 5000 neighbors who have participated in the PLADECO Community Development Plan.

In the field of culture, he has distinguished itself for bringing Chile to the International World Of Music, Arts & Dance (WOMAD) Festival, created by Peter Gabriel, and for the creation of the Popular School of Theater, among other policies aimed at massifying the cultural creation and cultural audience in the commune, through the Jazz and Theater Festivals in the neighborhoods.

He created the first "people's pharmacy" in the country, allowing drug prices to fall by 30% to 50% (three companies that have traditionally exercised an oligopoly in this market in Chile). More than 150 municipalities have adopted this system. He is gradually expanding the initiative by creating a "Popular Optical" (April 2016), a "Popular Real Estate" (January 2018), a "Popular Bookstore" (January 2019), a "Popular Record Shop" (April 2019) and an "Open University" (November 2018). He ran for the municipal elections of Chile in 2016 to continue as the mayor of the Recoleta commune. He was reelected with more than 56% of the votes among five candidates and managed to integrate four communist councilors into the municipal council out of a total of eight. His term ended in December 2020.

=== Involvement in national politics ===
During the second round of the 2017 Chilean general election, Jadue joined fellow communist and federal deputy Camila Vallejo in endorsing centre-left candidate Alejandro Guillier. This was made in the face of accusations that Communist Party leaders were failing to participate in a united left-wing front against right-wing candidate Sebastián Piñera.

== 2021 presidential candidacy ==
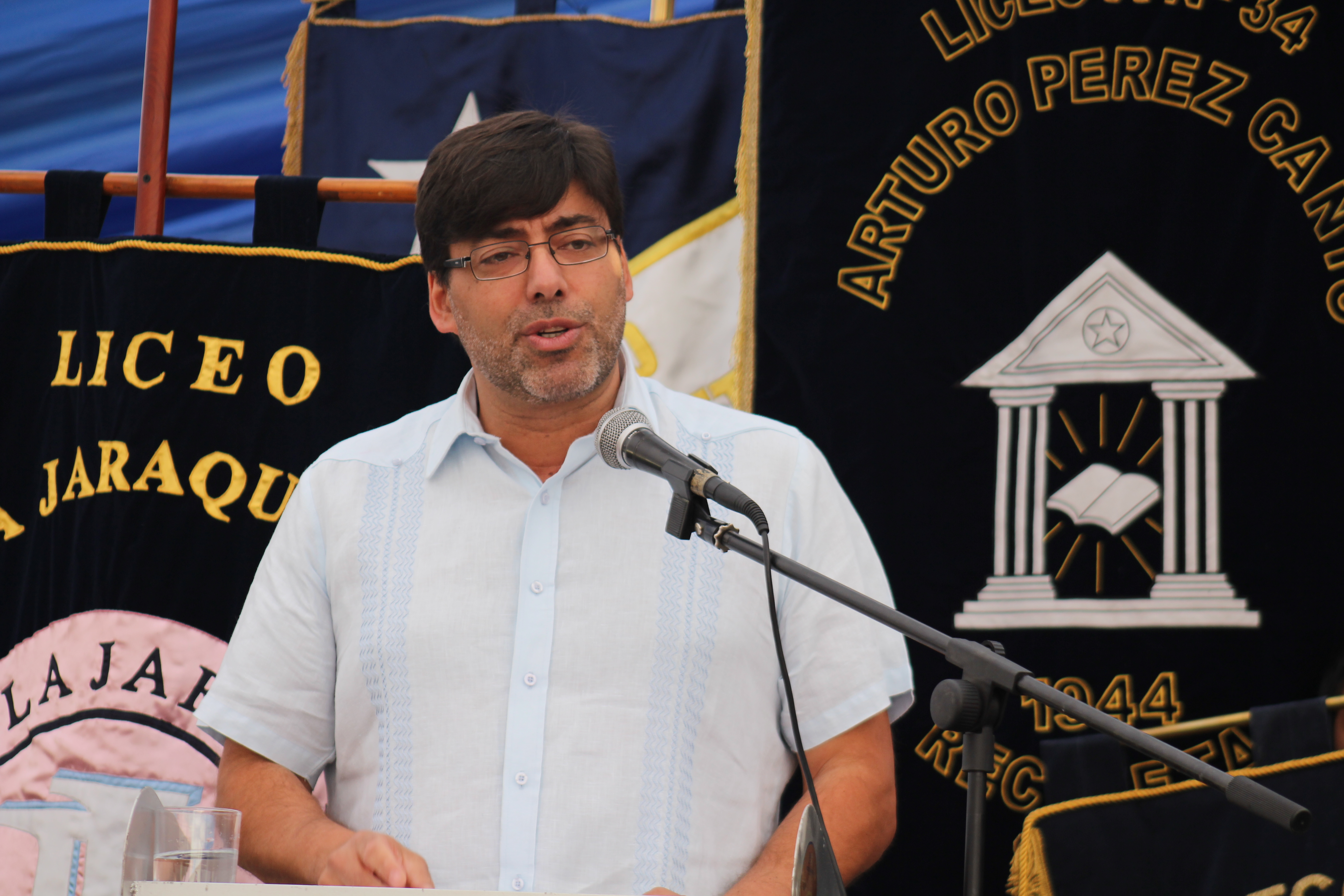
Jadue in 2015

=== Announcement ===
In mid-2020, he stated that he was "absolutely available" to become a presidential candidate for the 2021 Chilean general election. He showed up as the leading candidate in various polls.

By December 2020, the left-wing Broad Front coalition announced an alliance with Jadue, and he also had the backing of the Communist Party of Chile. Jadue's policies included "popular pharmacies" operated by local governments to provide low-cost medicine to citizens. He supports increasing the role of the government in the Chilean economy. This includes nationalizing Chile's pension system, copper, and water.

In April 2021, his presidential candidacy was formalized by the Communist Party after an announcement via Facebook.

=== Campaign team ===
Communist deputy Camila Vallejo, a former student leader during the 2011 student protests, was a member of Jadue's inner-circle in the 2021 election and was described as his campaign spokesperson. Observers have speculated that Vallejo's relative youth and large social media presence made her a key asset to Jadue, who sought to win the youth vote. It has been noted that major players in the "old guard" of the Communist Party, such as party president Guillermo Teillier, played a limited role in Jadue's campaign, leading some observers to argue they were sidelined in favor of younger party leaders.

Policy advisors to Jadue include Ramón López, a professor of Economics at the University of Chile. López has an extensive career as an economist and academic, having taught at the University of Maryland, College Park in the United States from 1990 to 2014. López previously served as an advisor at the World Bank and in 2017 advised the left-wing presidential campaign of Beatriz Sánchez. López stated that Jadue would pursue a social-democratic program if elected president, explaining he would govern in a manner "very similar to what many European countries did in the '70s and early '80s." López has additionally stated that Jadue rejects the land expropriation programs implemented associated with the "Soviet regime" and the "Allende model".

=== Primary results ===
Jadue lost the Apruebo Dignidad primary election to Gabriel Boric on 18 July 2021. Despite Jadue's lead in polls, Boric, a former student leader and current lawmaker, won 60% of the vote. Jadue congratulated Boric for his victory on Twitter.

== Political positions ==
As a presidential candidate, Jadue has proposed increasing taxes on high-earners in Chile to pay for social programs. Describing the "state capitalism" economic model of the former Soviet Union as a "brutal failure", Jadue has stated that the private sector would continue to exist under his leadership, specifically the small businesses able to pay an increased minimum wage of 567.000 Chilean pesos (US$762) per month. Jadue has criticized what he deems extractivism (the Chilean economy's reliance on natural resource extraction) and has stated that the country should work to diversify its economy to end its dependence on copper. In the realm of labor rights, Jadue advocates for the Chilean economy to transition to a 40-hour workweek, down from the country's current 45-hour workweek.

=== Economic policy ===
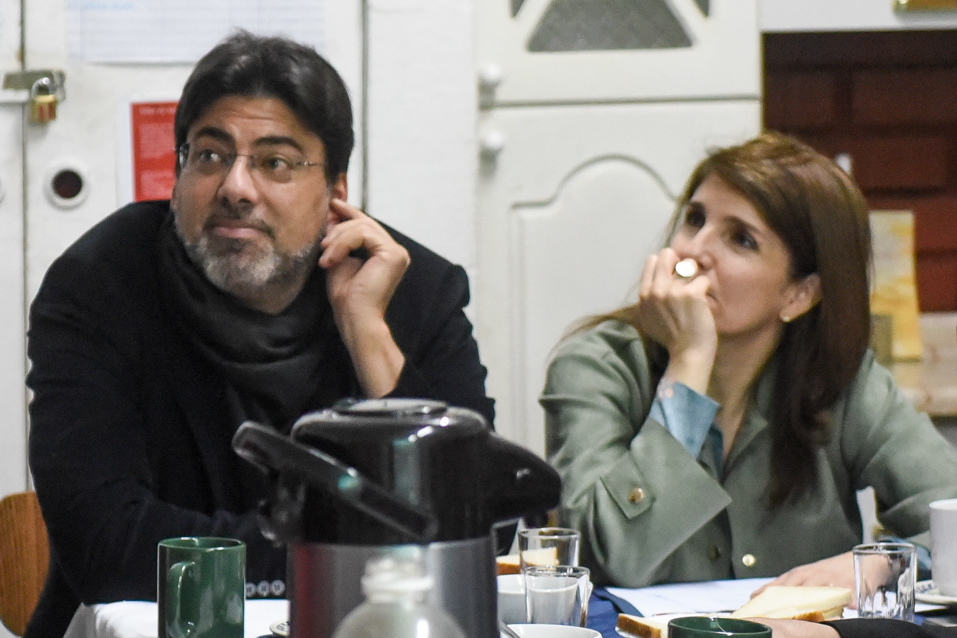
Jadue with minister general secretariat of government Paula Narváez in 2017

Jadue has argued that raising taxes on the wealthy is a moral imperative, stating "[w]e need a country that ensures a decent life, it cannot be that families have to go into debt to be able to eat". Jadue has said that the private sector will continue to exist in the Chilean economy during his tenure, and also stated that state policy should guide the country's economic fortunes. On monetary policy, Jadue favors less autonomy for the Central Bank of Chile.

During the 2021 election, Jadue has stated he would prioritize a tax reform program that would raise revenue by approximate 10% of the Chilean GDP to fund the creation of a national pension program along with other initiatives. Jadue's economic adviser has stated his model would be akin to that used by Sweden.

In the realm of labor rights, Jadue advocates for the Chilean economy to transition to a 40-hour workweek within his first year in office, down from the country's current 45-hour workweek. Jadue favors raising the minimum wage in Chile to 567,000 pesos a month, up from the current minimum of 320,500 pesos.

Jadue has argued that Chile must work to diversify its economy in order to end the country's dependence on copper. Jadue favors increasing mining taxes in alignment with neighboring Peru, Argentina, and Bolivia and for the Chilean government to have a stock in all copper mines.

=== Social policy ===
Jadue is a supporter of decriminalizing abortion in Chile and has advocated for "free and safe abortions up to 12 weeks". Chile, which criminalized abortion without exception until 2017, is considered to have among the most restrictive abortion rights policies in the world. Jadue is a self-described feminist.

To tackle discrimination against LGBTQ+ Chileans, Jadue has proposed the creation of a National Anti-Discrimination Service. Jadue favors the modification of Chile's gender identity law to allow for transgender Chileans to change their legal sex and name on government documents. As Mayor, Jadue helped negotiate a citywide agreement between Recoleta and trans rights organization Association Organizing Trans Diversities (OTD) to allow for the discounted sale of hormone replacement therapy medication such as decapeptyl at "people's pharmacies".

In the realm of Indigenous rights, Jadue stated in 2021 he favors land restitution and "limited autonomy" for the Mapuche people. In 2021, Jadue praised the election of Mapuche leader Elisa Loncón as president of the Constitutional Convention, calling her victory "undoubtedly the beginning of a new Chile" that would lead to "profound transformations for the benefit of the people". Jadue supports the establishment of an "intercultural plurinational state" in Chile inclusive of indigenous communities.

=== Healthcare policy ===
Since his initial election as Mayor of Recoleta, Jadue has been noted for championing "people's pharmacies" (farmacias populares), a series of municipal-run drugstores to provide patients with affordable medication. The "people's pharmacy" program is considered to be highly influential in Chile, with a 2016 report noting that the model has even seen adoption in areas far more affluent than the predominantly working-class suburb of Recoleta.

Jadue has asserted that the popular pharmaceutical model used in Recoleta is superior to that used in the wealthy neighborhood of Las Condes, and maintains that only the former has the potential to be applied nationwide. This statement was made as a criticism of Mayor of Las Condes and 2021 presidential rival Joaquín Lavín's leadership.

Jadue favors the legalization of cannabis in Chile and has made his support for legalization a key campaign issue in 2021. Jadue, who has stated he has never used drugs, favors the decriminalization of all narcotics, stating that drug users are either "sick but not criminals" or "social consumers" whose liberties should be respected. When asked about the role "people's pharmacies" might play in the distribution of decriminalized drug products, Jadue has stated he would support the sale of safe, "high-quality" drugs at "people's pharmacies".

=== Foreign policy ===
Jadue has criticized the foreign policy of President Sebastián Piñera, arguing he was too friendly towards conservative U.S. President Donald Trump. During the Crisis in Venezuela, Jadue alleged that Piñera's government was working in concert with the Trump Administration to overthrow President of Venezuela Nicolás Maduro. Jadue stated in 2020 that he condemns "any type of violation" of human rights following the release of findings by the United Nations that the Maduro government engaged in extrajudicial killings and torture.

At times, Jadue has criticized left-wing politicians affiliated with the "pink tide" such as former President Luiz Inácio Lula da Silva of Brazil, whose leadership he has described as "neoliberal." In 2018, Jadue voiced concern about a letter pushed by Chilean activists in favor of Lula's release from prison, insinuating it was comparable to U.S. intervention in Latin America, stating: "I in particular never liked Lula's government, I think it was a neoliberal government. Anyone who wants to show solidarity can do so, but from there to ask the political system to allow a candidacy of someone who is imprisoned to be registered, that is a Brazilian issue. One thing is to show solidarity, another is to intervene, who are we?"

Regarding the Atacama border dispute with neighboring Bolivia that has existed since Chile annexed the Bolivian Coast in 1879, Jadue has endorsed giving maritime territory back to Bolivia. Jadue has argued in favor of a "mutually beneficial" agreement with the Bolivian government, in which territory would be ceded in exchange for Chile acquiring some gas and water rights. Jadue has clarified that he would only support such an arrangement were it to receive a democratic mandate through a plebiscite. This proposal proved controversial across the political spectrum, with political figures such as former Minister of Foreign Affairs Heraldo Muñoz of the centre-left Party for Democracy (PPD) accusing Jadue of being ignorant on the subject of foreign policy.

=== Criticism ===
As a self-proclaimed communist, Jadue has been subject to criticism from conservatives who allege he would govern in an authoritarian manner akin to the leadership of the former Soviet Union. Mauricio Rojas, a Swedish-Chilean politician who served as Ministry of Cultures, Arts and Heritage in 2018, wrote an open letter to Jadue to inform him of the crimes committed by communist regimes. Similarly, Jadue's past defenses of the Venezuela's President Nicolás Maduro has led to criticisms of his judgement. Alfredo Joignant of Diego Portales University said Jadue's past defenses of the Maduro government constituted a "double standard" and expressed his concern for "the moral future of the left" regarding Jadue's views on the subject. Minister Secretary-General of the Presidency Juan José Ossa stated that Jadue's platform is reminiscent of that of Hugo Chávez.

Jadue has been the subject of criticism from figures associated with the Socialist Party for invoking the legacy of former president and party member Salvador Allende. Socialist Party leader Álvaro Elizalde pushed back against Jadue's invocation of Allende and noted that the Socialist Party has already nominated a candidate, former La Moneda official Paula Narváez, for the presidency. Senator Isabel Allende, the daughter of Allende and a member of the Socialist Party, stated that it "is not appropriate" for Jadue "to pose as the heir of Salvador Allende".

Jadue has been accused by the Simon Wiesenthal Center of antisemitism, which placed him in its "Top Ten Worst Global 2020 Anti-Semitic Incidents". In response the following day, a group of academics and organizations, including the Argentinian branch of the small International Jewish Anti-Zionist Network, stated their support for Jadue, claiming that "It is inconceivable that critique towards the State of Israel, which has created a reality of apartheid in the occupied territory, be understood as a form of antisemitism". However, in June 2021, the press circulated a page from Jadue's yearbook featuring antisemitic humor, such as references to cleansing the city of Jews. After outcry from Chile's Jewish community, a conservative majority in the Chilean Chamber of Deputies approved a resolution, 79–47–20, calling on Jadue to denounce the Antisemitism of the document. Jadue rebuffed the call, saying "let's get serious.", stating that it is absurd that he is being asked "to explain what others wrote in a school yearbook 35 years ago".

In January 2024, Jadue faced renewed accusations of antisemitism. At a book launch for Zionism: The Ideology That Exterminates, by Chilean journalist Pablo Jofré Leal, Jadue claimed that “Being Jewish starts from a conception that has to do with the supremacist conception of being part of a chosen people, so, if you are already part of a chosen people you do not believe in the equality of all human beings before anything, right? Well, here we are faced with an ideology that I believe is the most Nazi thing I have seen in my life.” For these comments, Jadue was criticized by fellow leftists Carmen Hertz and Miguel Lawner, and by the Jewish Community of Chile. Jadue maintains that his statements are supported by many left-wing Jews, calling the incident a "false controversy."

In December 2020, Jadue was criticized for breaking lockdown measures implemented during the COVID-19 pandemic in Chile by travelling between areas that were in different stages of the pandemic in order to participate in several political events. As a result, Jadue was fined over 3 million pesos. He commented that he had been unaware of the rule that he had broken and that it had not been made clear by the authorities at the time, but also that he had no excuse and shouldn't have gone to the area in question. Jadue has been accused of hypocrisy following revelations that he owns multiple properties as well as a Mini-Cooper, considered to be a luxury car. Critics maintain Jadue's affluent lifestyle is contradictory to the egalitarian politics he espouses.

== Bibliography ==
- Jadue, Daniel (2014). Palestina, crónica de un asedio [Palestine, chronicle of a siege] (in Spanish). Intermaterialmedia. ISBN 978-9569427039.
- Jadue, Daniel (2020). No lo vieron venir. Columnas, 2005–2020 [They didn't see it coming. Columns, 2005–2020] (in Spanish). LOM. ISBN 9789560013804.
