= National Renewal (Chile) =

Political party in Chile

National Renewal Renovación Nacional
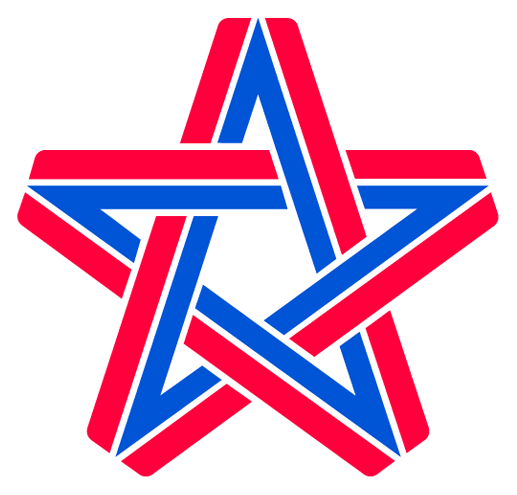
- Abbreviation: RN
- President: Andrea Balladares
- Secretary-General: Katherine Martorell
- Founded: 29 April 1987
- Registered: 28 January 1988
- Merger of: National Union Movement; Independent Democratic Union splinters National Labour Front
- Headquarters: 454 Antonio Varas avenue, Providencia, Santiago, Chile
- Youth wing: National Renewal Youth (JRN)
- Women's wing: Mujeres RN
- Indigenous wing: Pueblos Originarios RN
- Membership (2026): 41,554 (6th)
- Ideology: Reformism; Liberal conservatism; Economic liberalism; Neoliberalism; Faction: Pinochetism
- Political position: Centre-right to right-wing
- National affiliation: Chile Vamos (since 2015); Chile Grande y Unido (since 2025)
- Regional affiliation: Union of Latin American Parties
- International affiliation: International Democracy Union; Centrist Democrat International
- Colours: Blue, White and Red
- Chamber of Deputies: 23 / 155
- Senate: 11 / 50

Party flag
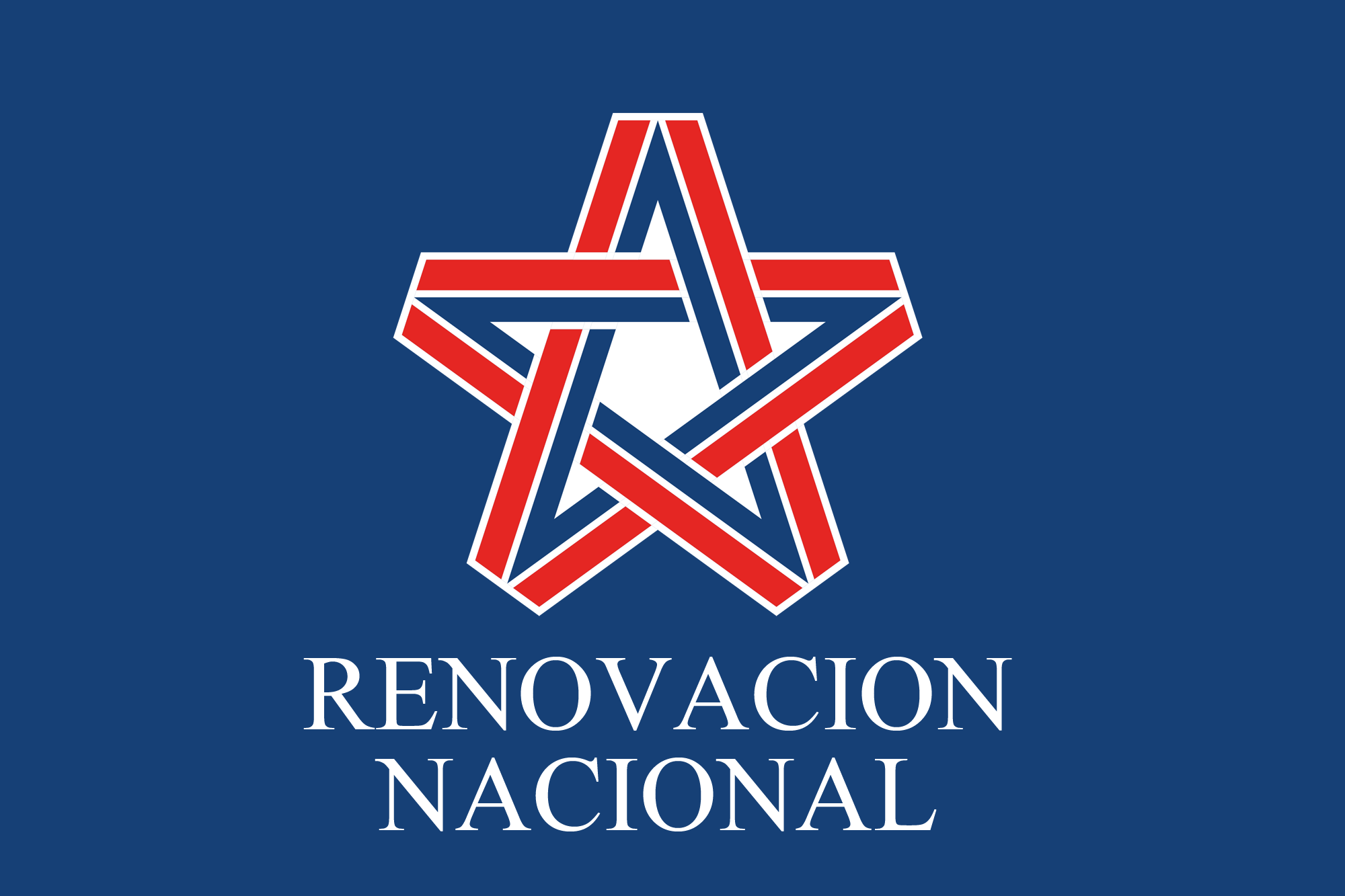

Website
- www.rn.cl

The National Renewal (Spanish: Renovación Nacional, RN) is a Chilean political party founded in 1987 with a reformist and liberal-conservative orientation. It is positioned within the centre-right of the political spectrum and, alongside the Independent Democratic Union (UDI), is considered one of the main forces of the Chilean right.

The party emerged in the final phase of the military regime under Augusto Pinochet through the merger of several liberal and moderately conservative movements, including the National Party (PN) and other groups. Its aim was to support the transition to democracy and to consolidate a modern, civic-democratic right.

Since the return to democracy in 1990, RN and the UDI have jointly formed the core of the electoral alliances Alianza and later Chile Vamos. During the periods 2010–2014 and 2018–2022, the party led the national government with Sebastián Piñera serving as President of the Republic.

Ideologically, RN combines market-oriented principles with a commitment to the rule of law, social responsibility and individual freedom. Its intellectual roots lie in liberalism, Christian-humanist thought and republicanism.

At the national level, the party is represented in both chambers of the Chilean Congress and maintains a strong base in urban and more affluent regions. Within the party, both economically liberal and more socially conservative currents coexist.

In Germany, RN cooperates with the CDU and its Konrad Adenauer Foundation as well as with the CSU and its Hanns Seidel Foundation.

== History ==
=== Early years ===
Renovación Nacional was founded on 29 April 1987, when three right-leaning organisations – the Movimiento de Unión Nacional (MUN), the Frente Nacional del Trabajo (FNT) and parts of the Independent Democratic Union (UDI) – merged ahead of the 1988 Chilean presidential referendum that would determine whether Augusto Pinochet would continue in office.

Shortly thereafter, the UDI split away again due to its strong support for Pinochet, while RN advocated a broader democratic opening. However, when Pinochet was officially nominated as a candidate, the majority of the new party ultimately supported him.

With 351 founding members, RN became the first political party to be officially registered following the lifting of the ban on political parties in place since the 1973 military coup.

Under the leadership of Andrés Allamand, membership increased rapidly and the party played an active role in the transition to democracy. In the 1999 presidential election, it supported the right-wing alliance's joint candidate, Joaquín Lavín, who narrowly lost the runoff to Ricardo Lagos.

=== 21st century ===
In the 2000s, RN again put forward Lavín, but after his polling numbers declined, Sebastián Piñera assumed the candidacy. In the 2006 presidential election he narrowly lost to Michelle Bachelet, but won the 2010 election, becoming the first centre-right president since the return to democracy. The party simultaneously gained significant ground in Congress and became one of the most influential political forces in Chile.

Following the 2013 election defeat and internal tensions, several deputies split off to form the movement Amplitud. Under the leadership of Cristián Monckeberg, RN modernised its public image, adopting a new logo in 2014 and a revised statement of principles distancing itself from the Pinochet era. In 2015, RN helped establish the new centre-right coalition Chile Vamos alongside the UDI, Evópoli and the PRI.

During Piñera's second administration (2018–2022), RN held numerous government positions.

=== 2020s ===
The Social Outburst of 2019–2020 triggered internal tensions: a moderate faction led by Mario Desbordes supported the constitutional process, while a conservative wing associated with Carlos Larraín opposed it.

After a closely contested internal power struggle, Francisco Chahuán, the joint opposition candidate against Desbordes, was elected party president in 2021 and led RN until 2023. His term, however, was marked by fragile control and pronounced internal fragmentation, illustrated by conservative factions supporting José Antonio Kast rather than the official candidate Sebastián Sichel in the 2021 presidential election.

In 2022, RN succeeded in re-establishing internal cohesion by unanimously deciding to reject the draft constitution promoted by left-wing, pro-Social Outburst activists. Even Desbordes, who had previously expressed sympathy for peaceful demonstrations, opposed the proposal.

In the referendum on the draft constitution, the "Reject" option won with 62% of the vote. RN and its coalition partners – UDI and Evópoli – gained two new allies: the movement Amarillos por Chile, from which the party Democrats later emerged. Both groups brought together former members of the Concertación willing to collaborate with the centre-right; both later endorsed Evelyn Matthei in the 2025 presidential election.

In 2023, Chahuán was succeeded by Rodrigo Galilea, a lawyer with a reserved public profile who strengthened RN's standing by making the party the most-voted force in the 2024 municipal and regional elections.

== Presidents of National Renewal ==
National Renewal has nine party presidents in its history:

- Ricardo Rivadeneira (1987)
- Sergio Onofre Jarpa (1987–1990)
- Andrés Allamand (1990–1997)
- Alberto Espina (1997–1999)
- Alberto Cardemil (1999–2001)
- Sebastián Piñera (2001–2004)
- Sergio Diez (2004–2006)
- Carlos Larraín (2006–2014)
- Cristián Monckeberg (2014–2018)
- Mario Desbordes (2018–2021)
- Francisco Chahuán (2021–2023)
- Rodrigo Galilea (2023–2026)
- Andrea Balladares (2026–2028)

== Election results ==
=== Presidential elections ===
The following is a list of the presidential candidates supported by the National Renewal. (Information gathered from the Archive of Chilean Elections).

Election year	Candidate	1st Round		2nd Round		Results
Election year	Candidate	# Votes	% Votes	# Votes	% Votes	Results
1988 (plebiscite)	In favor of Augusto Pinochet	3,119,110	44.0%	—N/a		Lost
1989	Hernán Büchi	2,052,116	29.4%	—N/a		Lost
1993	Arturo Alessandri Besa	1,703,408	24.2%	—N/a		Lost
1999–2000	Joaquín Lavín	3,352,192	47.5%	3,495,569	48.7%	Lost
2005–2006	Sebastián Piñera	1,763,694	25.4%	3,236,394	46.5%	Lost
2009–2010	Sebastián Piñera	3,074,164	44.1%	3,591,182	51.6%	Won
2013	Evelyn Matthei	1,648,481	25.1%	2,111,891	37.8%	Lost
2017	Sebastián Piñera	2,418,540	36.6%	3,796,918	54.5%	Won
2021	Sebastián Sichel	898,510	12.7%	—N/a		Lost
2025	Evelyn Matthei	1,617,720	12.5%	—N/a		Lost

=== Congress election ===
Election year	Chamber of Deputies			Senate			Status
Election year	# Votes	% Votes	Seats	# Votes	% Votes	Seats	Status
1989	1,242,432	18.3%	29 / 120	731,678	10.8%	5 / 38	Minority
1993	1,098,852	16.3%	29 / 120	279,580	14.9%	11 / 38	Minority
1997	971,903	16.8%	23 / 120	629,394	14.9%	7 / 38	Minority
2001	845,865	13.8%	18 / 120	342,045	19.7%	4 / 18	Minority
2005	932,422	14.1%	19 / 120	515,185	10.8%	8 / 38	Minority
2009	1,178,392	17.8%	18 / 120	382,728	20.2%	8 / 38	Minority
2009	1,178,392	17.8%	18 / 120	382,728	20.2%	8 / 38	Governing coalition with minority overall status
2013	928,037	14.9%	19 / 120	733,726	16.2%	8 / 38	Minority
2017	1,067,270	17.8%	36 / 155	349,622	20.9%	9 / 43	Governing coalition with minority overall status
2021	693,474	10.96%	25 / 155	549,553	11.8%	12 / 50	Minority
2025	868,240	8.10%	13 / 155	431,539	13.93%	8 / 50	Governing coalition with minority overall status

== Party logos ==
Emblem used 1987–2001, 2002–2005, and 2012–2014.

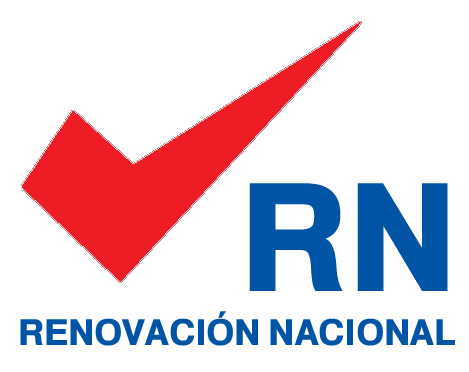
Emblem used 2001–2002.

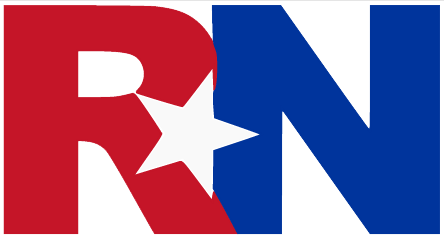
Emblem used 2005–2009.

Emblem used 2009–2012.

Emblem used since 2014.

== See also ==
- Alliance (Chile)
- Chile Vamos
- Independent Democratic Union
- Sergio Onofre Jarpa
- Andrés Allamand
- Sebastián Piñera
- Carlos Larraín
- Manuel José Ossandón
