= Carlos Larraín =

Chilean lawyer and politician

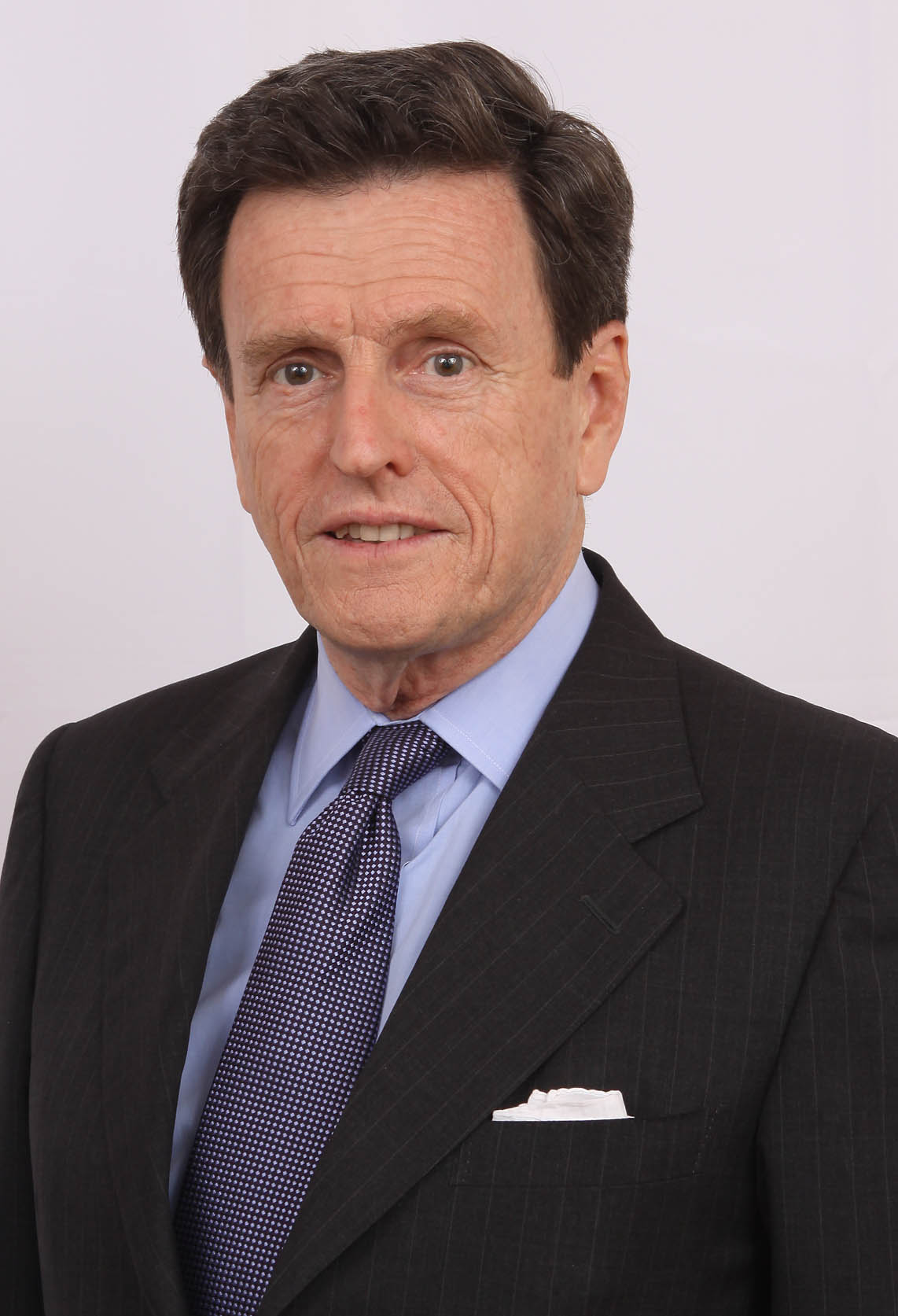

Member of the Senate of Chile
- In office 17 January 2011 – 11 March 2014
- Preceded by: Andrés Allamand
- Succeeded by: Ena von Baer

Mayor of Las Condes
- In office 11 June 1999 – 6 December 2000
- Preceded by: Joaquín Lavín
- Succeeded by: Francisco de la Maza

Personal details
- Born: November 18, 1942 (age 83) Santiago, Chile
- Party: National (1970–1973); National Renewal (since 2003)
- Spouse: Victoria Hurtado
- Children: 12
- Education: Pontifical Catholic University (LL.B); Catholic University of Louvain (LL.M)
- Occupation: Lawyer

Carlos Aníbal Larraín Peña (Santiago, 18 November 1942) is a Chilean lawyer and politician, member of National Renewal (RN).

Known for his conservative profile, Larraín served for eight years as president of RN, from 2006 to 2014. His political career has also been marked by controversial or ironic statements that have led to him being parodied.

From 2011 to 2014, he served as a senator of the Republic (appointed as Andrés Allamand's substitute) for the then Constituency No. 16 of the Los Ríos Region. He had previously been a councillor for the commune of Las Condes (terms 1996−1999 and 2000−2011), and mayor between 1999 and 2000, replacing Joaquín Lavín.

He currently hosts the radio program "Polos Opuestos" together with former minister Francisco Vidal, on Radio El Conquistador.

== Biography ==
He was born on 18 November 1942, in Santiago, the son of Fernando Larraín Vial and María Peña Claro. On his father's side he is a direct descendant of the conquistador Francisco de Aguirre, and through him of Castilian, Portuguese, and French royalty. He is also descended from the first Marquess of Larraín, José Toribio de Larraín, and from Presidents of the Republic Francisco Antonio Pinto and Manuel Bulnes. He is married to María Victoria Hurtado Vicuña, with whom he has twelve children.

He studied at Saint George's College, in Santiago. He then entered the Faculty of Law at the Pontifical Catholic University of Chile (PUC), being sworn in as a lawyer before the Supreme Court on 7 August 1967. The following year he completed a licentiate in economics and insurance law at the University of Leuven, Belgium.

His professional career has allowed him to practice in Chile and the United States. In 1994, he founded the law firm "Larraín y Asociados Ltda." specializing in corporate matters, aeronautical law, project finance, and mergers and acquisitions.

He ceased to be a partner of this firm once he was elected president of the National Renewal party, in 2006. He has also been a director of various commercial companies and president of Consorcio Nacional de Seguros Vida.

== Political career ==
=== Councillor and Mayor: Las Condes ===
He began his political career in 1996 when he was elected — in the municipal elections of that year — as a councillor of Las Condes, whose mayor was Joaquín Lavín. Upon succeeding the latter in June 1999 — after he resigned to run as a candidate in the presidential election of that same year —, he stood out mainly for ordering expenditures (Las Condes is one of the communes with the greatest resources in Santiago) and especially in the social and urban area. He is recognized as the main promoter of the urban remodeling of the El Golf neighborhood. He ended his term in December 2000, handing over the position to Francisco de la Maza, the newly elected mayor. After the municipal elections of that year he resumed his position as councillor, being re-elected in the 2004 municipal elections with the highest vote, for the 2004−2008 term.

In 2003 he joined the National Renewal (RN) party and was elected vice-president of Finance. Subsequently, he ran for the party presidency, competing with Carlos Cantero — who would withdraw his candidacy — and Pedro Sabat. The election was held on 27 May 2006, and he was elected with 64% of the preferences of the registered party members. He assumed as RN president in May 2006, replacing Sergio Diez. In the 2008 municipal elections, he was the most-voted councillor nationwide, for the 2008−2012 term.

=== Senator for Los Ríos ===
In March 2011 he was appointed a senator for Constituency 16 of the Los Ríos (XIV Region), which Andrés Allamand left vacant after being called by the President of the Republic Sebastián Piñera to join the ministerial cabinet in replacement of the resigned head of the National Defense Ministry, Jaime Ravinet.

During his parliamentary tenure he sat on the standing committees of Agriculture, from 8 March 2011 to 12 March 2012; and of Constitution, Legislation, Justice and Regulations, from 20 March 2012 to 10 March 2014.

For the November 2013 parliamentary elections he decided not to run for re-election for a new term (2014−2022). Likewise, that period was marked by the case of his son, Martín Larraín, who was involved in a controversial car accident and was ultimately acquitted in 2015 due to evidentiary elements showing he attempted to render aid to the deceased person.

=== Post-parliamentary period ===
In 2014 he left the RN presidency after eight years in office by not running for re-election. He was succeeded by fellow lawyer Cristián Monckeberg.

In 2020, Larraín was the party's leading figure in favor of the "Reject" option for a new constitution, which put him at odds with the emerging leadership of Mario Desbordes, who sought to reconcile the demands of the social uprising. Despite Larraín's heavy defeat in the October national plebiscite (22%−78%), two years later he would regain ground against Desbordes, who ended up coinciding with Larraín in rejecting the 2022 draft constitution, which prevailed with 62% against "Approve" (38%).

During 2023, he made headlines for his strident statements against the government of Gabriel Boric. He also drew attention for his attempt to lead RN together with María José Gatica and Francisco Orrego, an emerging television figure who has often been associated as a kind of "protégé" of Larraín.

== In popular culture ==
In 2013, Carlos Larraín was impersonated and portrayed by the comedian Stefan Kramer in his film El ciudadano Kramer (lit. The citizen Kramer). In it, Larraín became associated with the phrase «la chupilca del diablo».

== See also ==
- Larraín family
