= Hugo Herrera =

Hugo Herrera may refer to:

- Hugo Herrera Baeza, Chilean politician, councilman of La Florida
- Hugo Herrera (Chilean footballer) (born 1998), played for Deportes Santa Cruz
- Hugo E. Herrera (born 1974), Chilean legal philosopher
