= Sebastián Sichel =

Chilean politician and lawyer (born 1977)

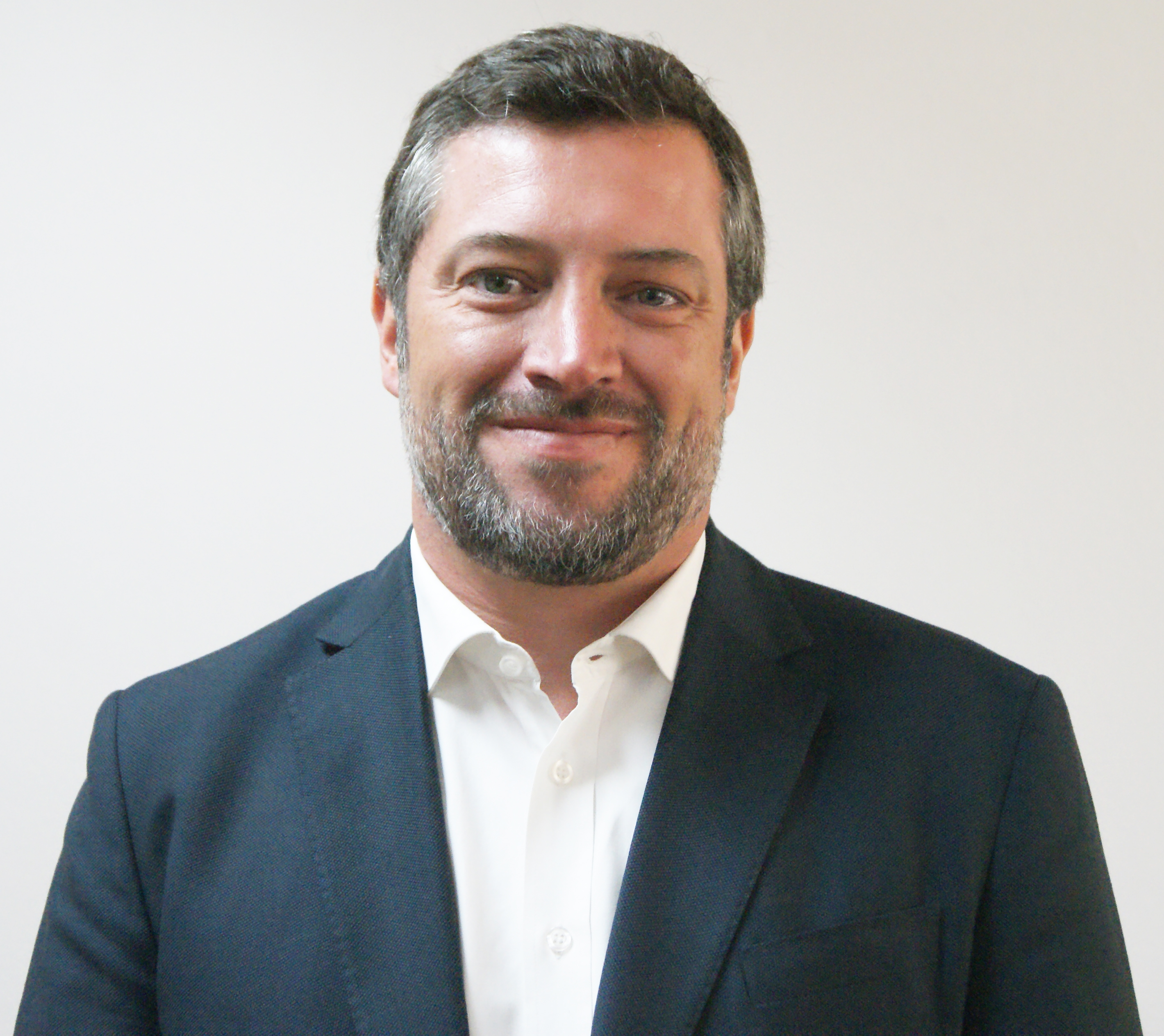
- Sichel in 2018

Mayor of Ñuñoa
- Incumbent
- Assumed office 6 December 2024
- Preceded by: Emilia Ríos

President of the Banco del Estado de Chile
- In office 4 June 2020 – 18 December 2020
- Preceded by: Arturo Tagle
- Succeeded by: Ricardo de Tezanos Pinto

Minister of Social Development
- In office 19 June 2019 – 4 June 2020
- President: Sebastián Piñera
- Preceded by: Alfredo Moreno Charme
- Succeeded by: Cristián Monckeberg

Executive Vice President of the CORFO
- In office 9 March 2018 – 13 June 2019
- Preceded by: Eduardo Bitrán
- Succeeded by: Pablo Terrazas

Personal details
- Born: Sebastián Andrés Sichel Ramírez; 30 July 1977 (age 49) Santiago, Chile
- Party: Christian Democratic Party (1990–2015); Citizens (2015–2018); Independent (2018–present)
- Spouse: Bárbara Encina (m. 2008)
- Children: 3
- Education: Pontifical Catholic University of Chile (BA); Autonomous University of Barcelona (MA)
- Occupation: Politician
- Profession: Lawyer

Sebastián Iglesias Sichel Ramírez (Note: In this Chilean name, his first name is Sebastián, his middle name is Iglesias, his paternal surname is Sichel, and his maternal surname is Ramírez. He was born Sebastián Andrés Sichel Ramírez, but at age three his paternal surname was replaced with that of his stepfather, Iglesias. At age 30, he restored his biological paternal surname, Sichel, dropped the middle name Andrés, and kept Iglesias as his middle name rather than as a surname.) (born 30 July 1977) is a Chilean lawyer, professor, mayor elect of Ñuñoa, ex minister of State and politician who served as president of the Banco del Estado de Chile (BancoEstado) from June 2020 until December 2020. He also previously served as Minister of Social Development and Family and executive vice president of Corfo under the second government of Sebastián Piñera. He was an independent candidate in the 2021 Chilean presidential election who ran under the centre-right Chile Podemos Más coalition.

In 2010, he was one of the founding members of El Dínamo, an online newspaper on topics such as politics, culture, and sports.

== Biography ==
Born in Santiago, his parents are Antonio Alejandro José Sichel Poblete and Ana María Ramírez Alvarado. His birth name was registered as Sebastián Sichel, but his paternal surname was changed to Iglesias after his mother married Saúl Iglesias. When Sebastián Iglesias was 11 years old, he learned from his grandfather that Saúl Iglesias was not his father. He then met his biological father for the first time at age 30 and changed his paternal surname back to Sichel, but retained Iglesias as his middle name out of affection.

He studied at the María Goretti Lyceum, in Concón, and the Alexander Fleming Lyceum. Subsequently, he obtained a law degree from the Pontifical Catholic University of Chile (PUC) where he also obtained his master's degree in public law. Sichel Ramírez was a professor of constitutional law at the San Sebastián University from 2016 to 2018.

In 2008, he married the journalist Bárbara Encina. They have three children.

== Political career ==
In the 2013 parliamentary elections, he ran for the position of deputy for the districts of Las Condes, Vitacura and Lo Barnechea. His bid was supported by the Public Force movement. The party later became the Citizens party (Ciudadanos), which was founded by Andrés Velasco, a former minister of Michelle Bachelet.

In a controversial move, he resigned from the Christian Democratic Party in 2015, distancing himself from emblematic figures such as Claudio Orrego, whose presidential candidacy Sichel worked for in 2013. In 2016, he was on the verge of becoming a presidential candidate of the Citizens party for the 2017 Chilean general election.

From 2013 to 2018, he served as the executive president of the Plural Chile Study Center, representing it in hearings regulated by lobbying legislation. He was also the executive director of the public issues business network Giro País and a partner at Paréntesis Comunicaciones. During Sichel's presidency at Plural Chile, the foundation received $225,000 in 2017 from Open Society Foundations, established by Hungarian-American investor George Soros, for a two-year term.

In 2016, Plural proposed eliminating the law that prohibits hiring more than 15% foreign employees. Sichel argued that, in the immigration debate, Chile Vamos had shown "irresponsibility," creating "an anti-immigration climate that is exactly the opposite of what the country needs today. (...) The study shows that many are making blunders to capture votes without addressing the issue seriously. (...) Economic growth is unfeasible without immigration as one of the vectors driving that growth."

On 19 November 2017, he decided to publicly support Sebastián Piñera, distancing himself from Andrés Velasco.

On 2 May 2018, during the second government of President Piñera, he became executive vice president of Corfo, becoming the first member of the Citizens party to hold public office. He took command of the lithium exploitation contracts signed by his predecessor Eduardo Bitran with the company SQM.

On 13 June 2019, he became Minister of Social Development and Family, after the cabinet change announced by President Piñera.

After the crisis experienced within the Citizens party during the election of its leadership, Sichel resigned from the party and became one of the founders of the Libres ("Free") political movement in March 2019. The new political movement was led by ex-members of Citizens who distanced themselves from Andrés Velasco.

He remained in the position of Minister of Social Development and Family until 4 June 2020, when he was reassigned by Piñera as president of BancoEstado.

Sichel remained BancoEstado's president until December 2020. He shortly after announced his desire to participate as an independent candidate in a primary of the centre-right coalition Chile Podemos Más (previously Chile Vamos) for the 2021 Chilean presidential election. On 18 July 2021, he won the coalition's primary and became its presidential candidate. He received 49% of the vote, beating three other candidates including Joaquín Lavín, who previously ran in the 1999 and 2005 presidential elections and was considered a frontrunner in the primary. Sichel is considered the favourite candidate of the private sector and is supported in his presidential campaign by prominent business figures.

In the presidential election on 21 November 2021, Sichel received 898,510 (12.79%) of votes cast, ranked fourth out of seven candidates, and did not qualify for the second round. He supported the far-right candidate José Antonio Kast in the second round.

== Controversies ==
In the midst of the COVID-19 pandemic in Chile and the high level of unemployment in the country, on 18 May 2020, President Sebastián Piñera announced from inside La Moneda the delivery of a family basket in aid for the entire middle class. Sichel, in his position as Minister of Social Development and Family, had to publicly correct the president's announcement, maintaining that the "percentage of the population benefited" will only have a scope for "70% of the most vulnerable 40%".

On 4 June 2020, President Piñera announced a cabinet reshuffle amid the growing coronavirus cases in Chile. Former minister Cristián Monckeberg was then assigned to the Ministry of Social Development and Family, replacing Sichel, who was appointed as president of BancoEstado.

== Notes ==
Government offices
Preceded by Eduardo Bitrán	Executive Vice President of CORFO; 2018–2019	Succeeded by Pablo Terrazas
Preceded by Arturo Tagle	President of Banco del Estado de Chile; 2020	Succeeded by Ricardo de Tezanos Pinto
Political offices
Preceded by Alfredo Moreno Charme	Minister of Social Development; 2019–2020	Succeeded by Cristián Monckeberg
