= Joaquín Lavín =

Chilean politician (born 1953)

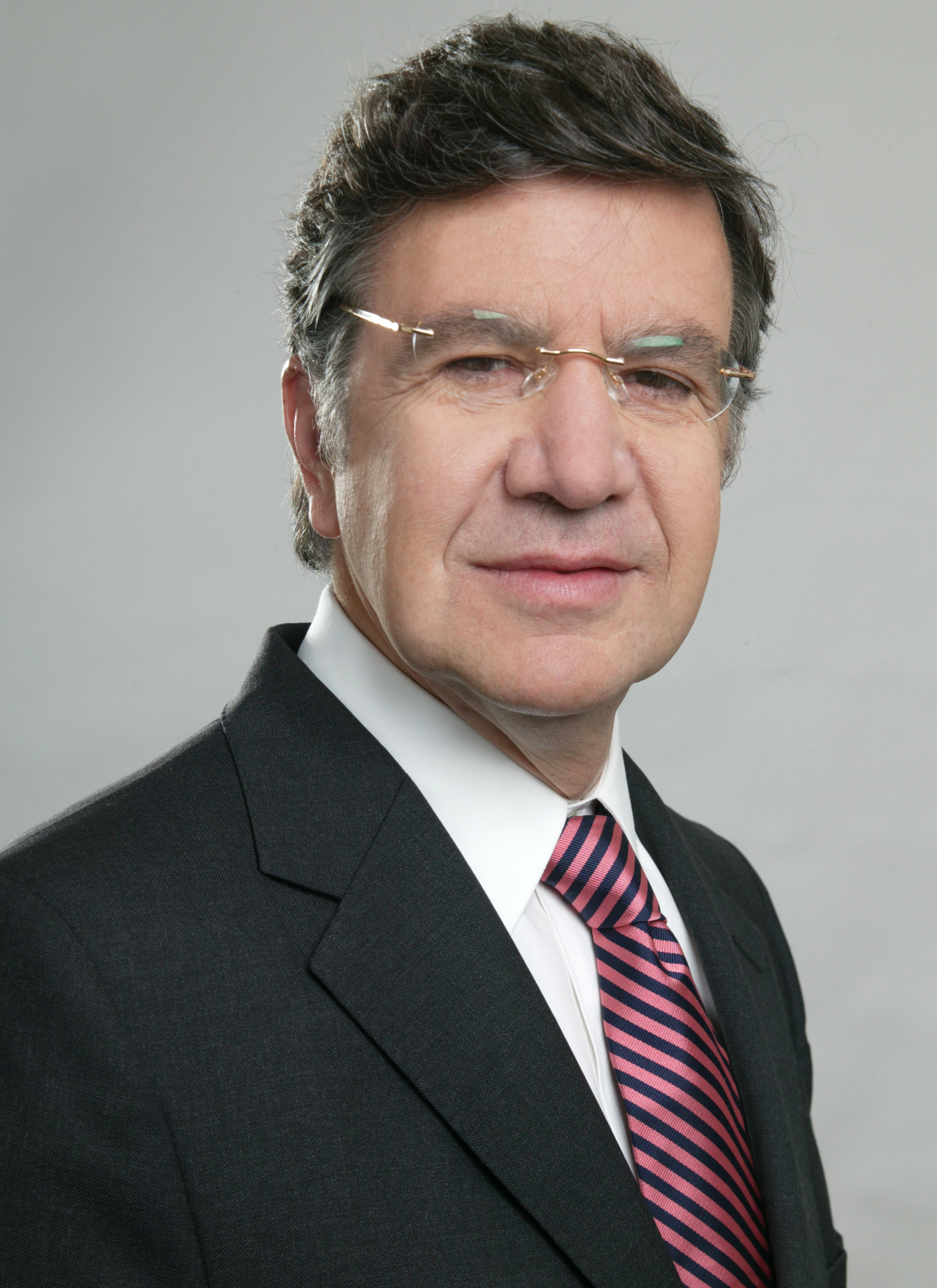

Mayor of Las Condes
- In office 6 December 2016 – 28 June 2021
- Preceded by: Francisco de la Maza
- Succeeded by: Daniela Peñaloza
- In office 26 September 1992 – 11 June 1999
- Preceded by: Eduardo Jara Miranda
- Succeeded by: Carlos Larraín Peña

Mayor of Santiago
- In office 6 December 2000 – 6 December 2004
- Preceded by: Jaime Ravinet
- Succeeded by: Raúl Alcaíno

Minister of Social Development
- In office 13 October 2011 – 13 June 2013
- President: Sebastián Piñera
- Preceded by: Felipe Kast
- Succeeded by: Bruno Baranda

Minister of Education
- In office 11 March 2010 – 18 July 2011
- President: Sebastián Piñera
- Preceded by: Mónica Jiménez de la Jara
- Succeeded by: Felipe Bulnes Serrano

Personal details
- Born: 23 October 1953 (age 72) Santiago, Chile
- Party: Independent Democratic Union
- Spouse: María Estela León
- Children: 7
- Education: Universidad Católica de Chile; University of Chicago
- Occupation: Economist
- Website: Ministry of Education of Chile

Joaquín José Lavín Infante (born 23 October 1953) is a Chilean politician of the Independent Democratic Union (UDI) party and former mayor of Las Condes, in the northeastern zone of Santiago. Formerly Lavín has also been mayor of Santiago, Minister of Education and Minister of Social Development. He ran for president twice in 1999 and 2005, losing both times. In 2021 he tried to run again, but this time he was defeated in a primary election by Sebastián Sichel. Besides his political involvement Lavín has been active in education in the University for Development, of which he was one of the founders and original owners, and as editor of the economics section in El Mercurio.

His wife, son and daughter-in-law have also been elected politicians.

== Early life and career ==
Lavin was born on 23 October 1953 in Santiago to Joaquín Lavín Pradenas and Carmen Infante Vial. Lavin's father is believed to have owned over 500 hectares of land. Lavin studied economics at the University of Chicago, where he studied under Milton Friedman, one of many "Chicago Boys" to influence Chilean politics.

Lavin is married to María Estela León Ruíz, and the couple have 7 children, including federal deputy Joaquín Lavín León.

== Career ==
Lavín was present in the Acto de Chacarillas in 1977, a ritualized pro-Pinochet act reminiscent of Francoist Spain.

In the period of 1979–1981 at the age of 26 he was appointed as a Dean of Economic Department at Concepción University. From 1981 until 1986 Lavin was a desk-editor of Economics and Business in the newspaper El Mercurio. In 1990 he founded with other partners the private Universidad del Desarrollo.

His professional life was always connected with politics and the first step toward this was done when he became a mayor of Las Condes in 1992.

He wrote a book, Una revolución silenciosa ("A Quiet Revolution"), in support of General Augusto Pinochet's economic policies. Afterwards, in 1992, Lavín was elected mayor of Las Condes, a stronghold of the right, with 31% of the vote and reelected in 1997 with 78% of the vote.

Lavín was the presidential candidate for the UDI-National Renewal coalition Alliance for Chile in the 1999 election. He eventually lost to PS/PPD candidate Ricardo Lagos in a runoff by 200,000 votes. Lavín again represented UDI in the 2005 presidential election, but ended in third place with 23.23% of the vote, due to the presence of another right-wing candidate in the race, Sebastián Piñera, who made it to the runoff election with 25.41% of the vote.

Lavín was narrowly defeated in his bid for a Senate seat in the general election held in December 2009, but on 10 February 2010, President-elect Sebastián Piñera named him Secretary of Education.

In July 2011, President Piñera replaced Lavín as Minister of Education by Felipe Bulnes as a response to the months of student protest and appointed him as Minister of Social Development (2011-2013).

In 2016 he was elected mayor of Las Condes again getting 78% of the vote.

He is now Dean of the Business School of the Universidad del Desarrollo (UDD).

Lavín is a devout Roman Catholic and also a supernumerary member of the Prealature of Opus Dei.

On 16 July 2017, Lavín garnered controversy after he hung a rainbow flag over the town hall. This prompted criticism from former presidential candidate José Antonio Kast, himself a former UDI member, who said that there was a "gay dictatorship" in Chile that "corners certain politicians who do not have the courage to say things as they believe them". Lavín had also refused to allow the anti-transgender Bus of Freedom, a bus created by the CitizenGo initiative HazteOir, to pass through Las Condes. Lavín had claimed that his refusal to allow the bus to pass through was related to a timing issue. On 20 July, he had expressed openness to same-sex adoption.

During his campaigning to run for the Chilean presidency a noticeable effort was made by his parti UDI to put him at the forefront of all public television channels. He was frequently invited as a guest in morning shows, where he talked about politics and also did some more casual and relaxed appearances. The public nevertheless noticed that he was constantly invited to these TV shows as means of political strategy to make people feel that he is a relatable figure. Due to the constant mocking and comments in social media about the exacerbated appearances he gradually stopped appearing on TV.
