= Piñera =

Pinera or Piñera may refer to:

== People ==
- Piñera (surname)
- Mike Pinera (1948 – 2024), American musician
- Piñera family, a Chilean political family, including, most notably:
  - Sebastián Piñera (1949–2024), President of Chile from 2010 to 2014 and 2018 to 2022
  - Miguel Piñera (1954–2025), Chilean singer and brother of Sebastián Piñera
  - José Piñera, Chilean politician and brother of Sebastián and Miguel
  - José Piñera Carvallo (1917–1991), Chilean politician and father of Sebastián, José and Miguel
  - Andrés Chadwick Piñera (born 1956), Chilean lawyer, politician, and cousin of Sebastián Piñera
  - Bernardino Piñera (1915–2020), Chilean Catholic bishop and cousin of Sebastián, Miguel and José

== Places ==
=== Australia ===
- Pinera railway station, in Adelaide, South Australia

=== Spain ===
- Piñera (Castropol), a parish in Castropol, Asturias
- Piñera (Cudillero), a parish in Cudillero, Asturias
- Piñera (Narcea), a parish in Cangas del Narcea, Asturias
- Piñera (Navia), a parish in Navia, Asturias
- La Piñera, a parish in Morcín, Asturias
- San Juan de Piñera, a parish in Cudillero, Asturias
