= Valbuena Abbey =

Coordinates: 41°37′46″N 4°15′41″W

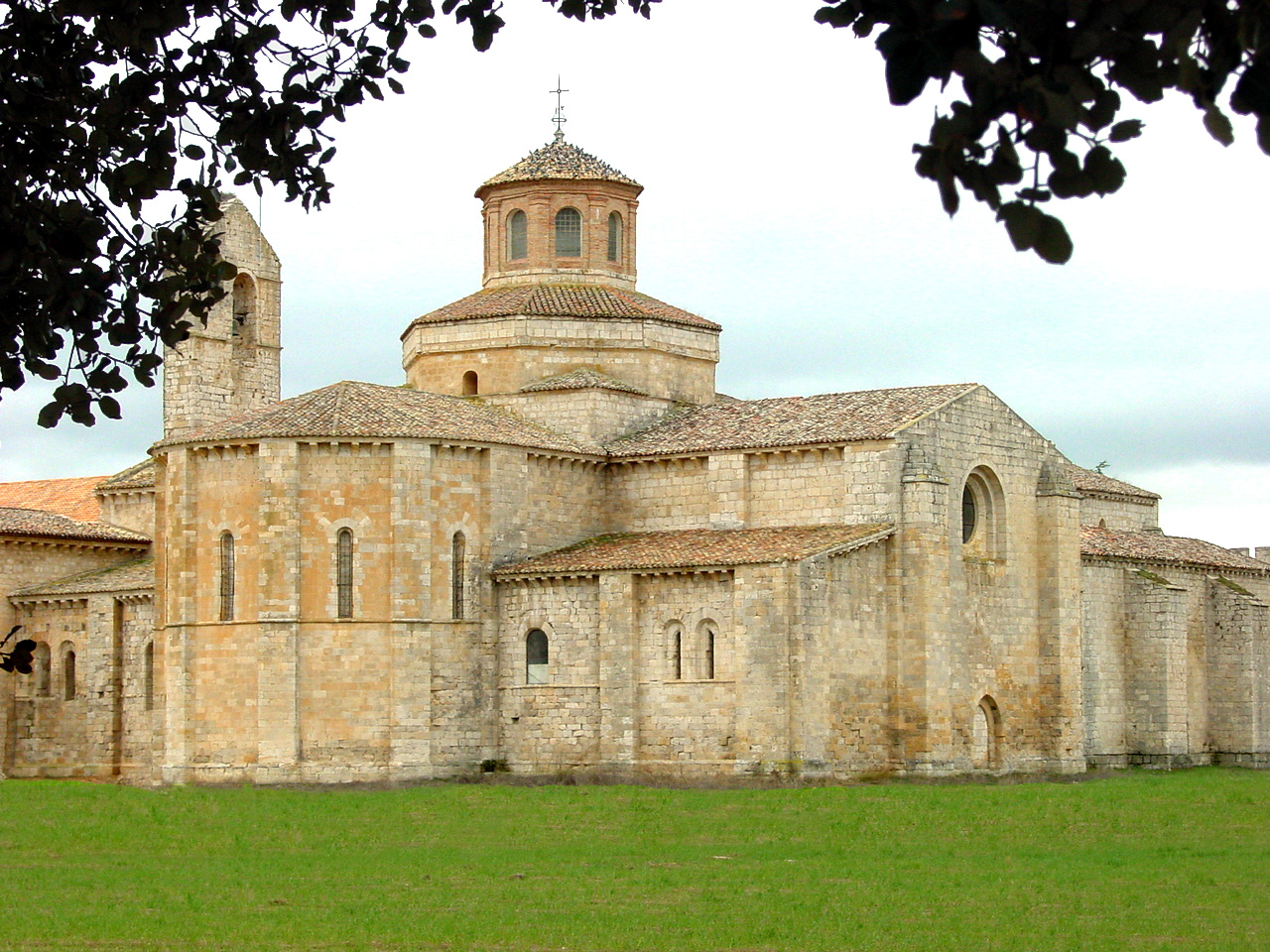
Valbuena Abbey from the north-east.

Valbuena Abbey (Spanish: Monasterio de Santa María de Valbuena) is a former Cistercian monastery in Valbuena de Duero in Valladolid Province, Castile-Leon, Spain. It stands on the right bank of the Duero, within sight of the royal castle of Peñafiel.

== History ==
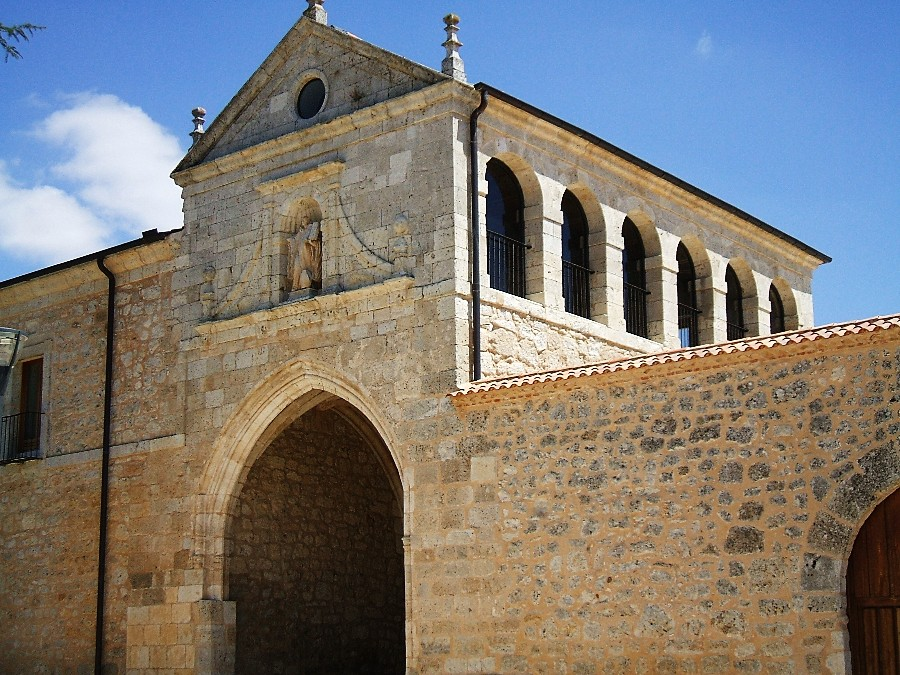
Western facade of the sections of the monastery.

The monastery was founded in 1143 by Estefanía, daughter of Count Ermengol V of Urgell, and settled from Berdoues Abbey in France, of the filiation of Morimond.

The first two abbots were Martin and Ebrardo. Valbuena received a number of privileges shortly after its foundation, and flourished to the point where it was able to settle three daughter houses of its own: Rioseco Abbey, founded in 1148; Bonaval Abbey, founded in 1164; and Palazuelos Abbey, founded in 1169.

In the 14th century a decline set in. Valbuena remained a daughter house of Berdoues until 1430, when the Castilian Cistercian Congregation was established; thereafter it was a daughter house of Poblet Abbey. The abbey was dissolved under the anti-ecclesiastical Mendizábal government in 1835.

The church became a parish church and was used later as a Francoist concentration camp, confirmed to have been operating from April to May 1939. Later, the conventual buildings passed into private ownership and were eventually acquired by a Baron Carlos Kessel, who sold them to Juan Pardo. The monastery was declared a Monumento Nacional (Bien de Interés Cultural) in 1931 and managed by Pardo's heirs until 1950.

In October 1950, the Ministry of Agriculture issued a decree declaring the expropriation of the "Coto de San Bernardo" estate by the Instituto Nacional de Colonización (I.N.C.) in the social interest, requiring immediate occupation. In June 1951, after forced expropriation, the I.N.C. bought the land into which the monastery was incorporated, except for the church, the sacristy and the rectory. Next to the monastery, the I.N.C. built a new settlement to accommodate neighbors from Santa María de Poyos (Province of Guadalajara) – whose municipal area was flooded by the construction of the Entrepeñas dam – and Valbuena de Duero.

From 1954 to the end of the 1960s, the I.N.C. undertook numerous alterations and alterations to the building and asked how it would be used once the work was completed. The Order of Mercedaria's offer to convert the monastery into a training house or novitiate was rejected and sold to the Archdiocese of Valladolid in July 1966. Around 1990, it was given to the Las Edades del Hombre, a religious foundation. Since then, several ad hoc restoration projects have taken place. In the 1990s, the monastery was renovated and rebuilt by the Spanish architect Pablo Puente Aparicio. In March 2000, the Council of Castile and León awarded the monastery of Santa Maria de Valbuena the category of National Heritage.

== Buildings and site ==
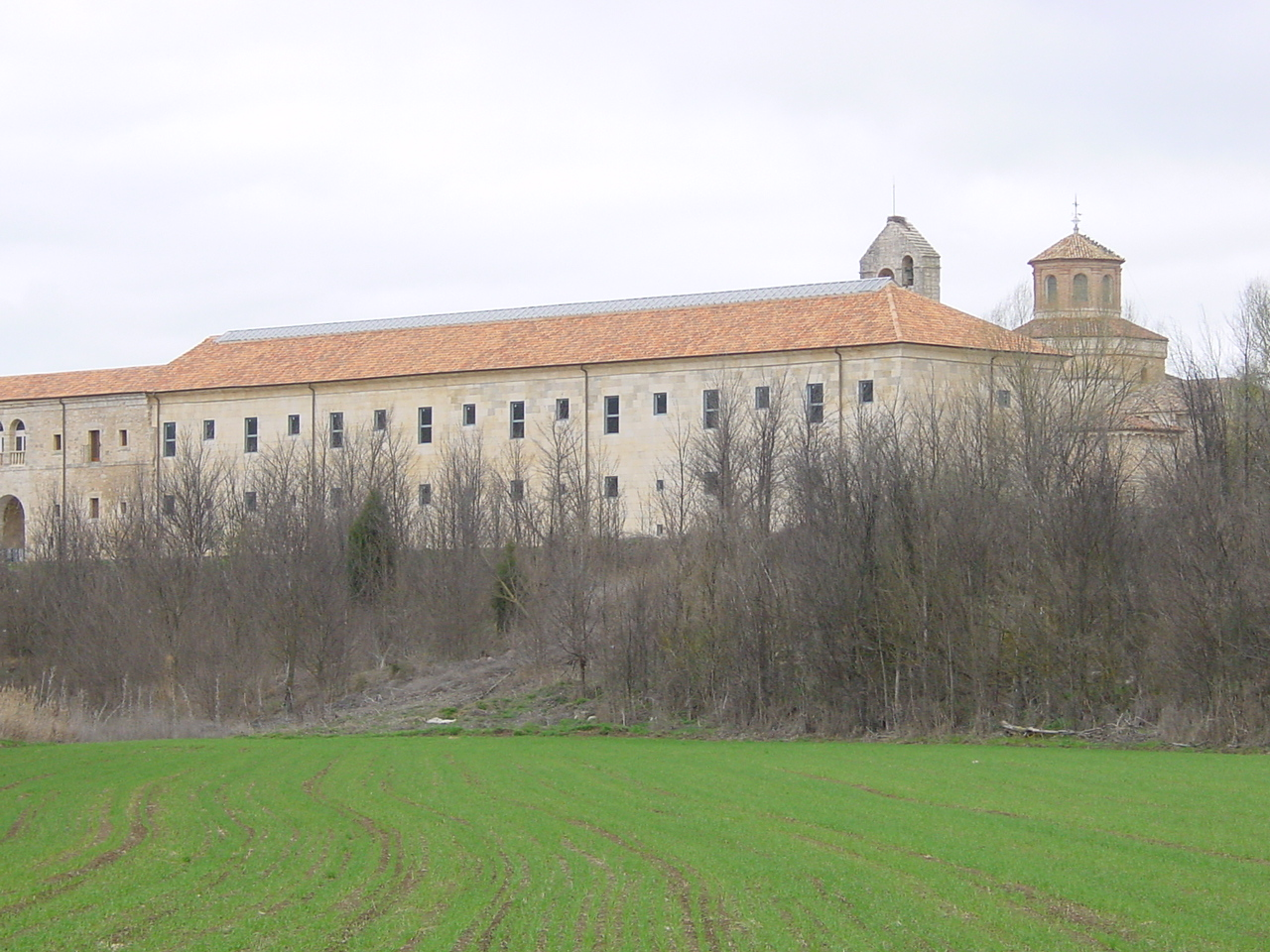
Façade of the guest wing.

The building complex, which was more or less complete by 1230, and most of which still stands, comprises the church, built from 1149 onwards, the conventual buildings, the guest wing, dormitories and the lay brothers' area. The groin-vaulted church of three aisles in four bays, with a barrel-vaulted transept and a crossing which was heightened in the Renaissance and covered with a cupola, is largely in accordance with the usual Cistercian building practice. The church also has an unusually large semi-circular apse, between two smaller semi-circular side apses, and also a rectangular side-chapel, built in 1165. The nave is in the early Gothic style. The west front has a portal with a pointed arch and several archivolts, over which is a large oculus in a blind arch.

The chapter house and the day room are also groin-vaulted, while the refectory on the south side of the complex has a pointed barrel-vaulted roof of four bays. The cloister has two storeys. The Capilla San Pedro ("St. Peter's Chapel") contains an arcosolium with a mural of a king from the period of around 1270. The lay brothers' wing was removed in the Renaissance to make room for a second courtyard. By the river stand the ruins of the abbot's house, dating from the 16th century.

The abbey was declared a national monument in 1931.
