= Pablo Puente =

Pablo Puente may refer to:

- Pablo Puente (prelate) (1931–2022), Spanish Roman Catholic archbishop and apostolic nuncio
- Pablo Puente Aparicio (1946–2020), Spanish architect and academic
