= Bonaval =

Bonaval may refer to:

- Convent of San Domingos de Bonaval, a former Dominican monastery in Santiago de Compostela, Galicia, Spain
- Monastery of Bonaval, Retiendas, Spain
- Bernal de Bonaval (13th century), Galician troubadour
