= Cudillero =

Cudillero Cuideiru
- Municipality
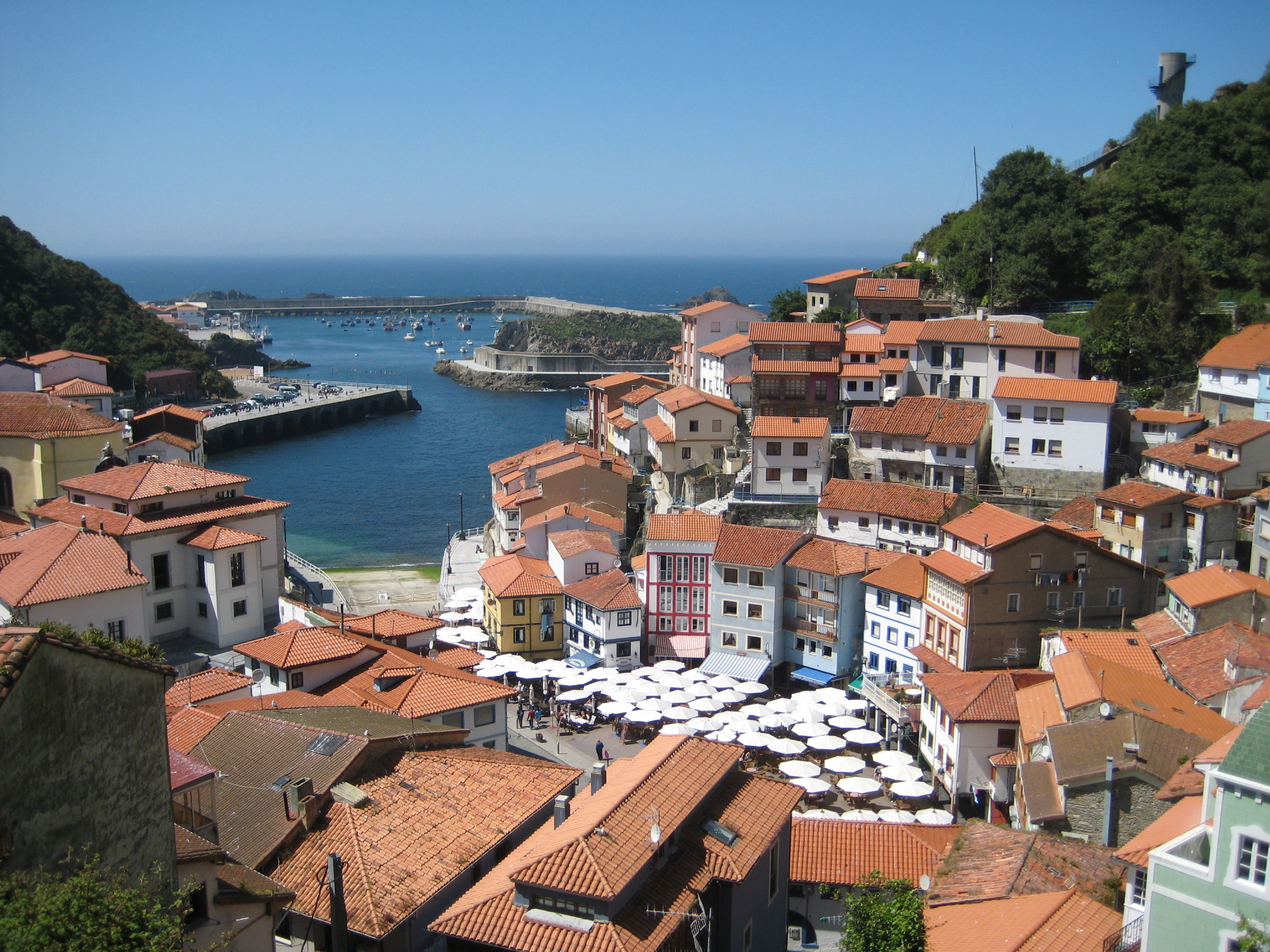

- Flag Coat of arms

- Location of Cudillero

- Location in Spain
- Coordinates: 43°33.6′N 6°9′W
- Country: Spain
- Autonomous community: Asturias
- Province: Asturias
- Comarca: Avilés
- Capital: Cudillero

Government
  - Alcalde: Ignacio Escribano Fernández (PP)

Area
  - Total: 100.78 km^{2} (38.91 sq mi)
- Elevation: 785 m (2,575 ft)

Population (2025-01-01)
  - Total: 4,867
  - Density: 48.29/km^{2} (125.1/sq mi)
- Demonym(s): pixuetu, pixueta
- Time zone: UTC+1 (CET)
  - Summer (DST): UTC+2 (CEST)
- Postal code: 33150 al 33159
- Official language(s): Pixueto, Spanish

Spanish Cultural Heritage
- Type: Non-movable
- Criteria: Historic ensemble
- Designated: 29 June 2006
- Reference no.: RI-53-0000610

Cudillero (Asturian: Cuideiru) is a municipality in the Principality of Asturias, Spain. Nowadays, Cudillero's main economic activities are related to tourism, but it is also known for its fishing industry. A legend says that it was founded by the Vikings. In addition to Castilian some locals still speak a dialect called Pixueto.

Cudillero is often described in the Spanish media as one of the country's most beautiful villages.

== History ==
Prehistory and Romanization

The history of this municipality was linked to that of Pravia until the 18th century. As a result, it is challenging to find records pertaining solely to the current municipality of Cudillero, as its administrative boundaries did not gain autonomy until the 19th century.

No prehistoric human remains have been discovered within the current territory of Cudillero, though such findings exist in neighboring municipalities.

The first archaeological traces within Cudillero date to the Castro culture period, with two hillforts identified: the castros of La Garita and La Cavona. Another site, Gurión, was discovered relatively recently. All these settlements appear to be of pre-Roman origin, while Roman-era remains in the area are scarce and poorly defined.

Middle Ages and Early Modern Period

The founding of the port of Cudillero and its earliest settlement dates to the 13th century. The oldest document mentioning the town is a 1285 deed in which Arias González de Valdés donated to the Monastery of Obona (in Tineo) "a plot in the port of Cudillero for selling bread and a hut with access to the sea, free from interference by any lord." Also in the 13th century, the town of Pravia was established, quickly becoming the capital of a vast municipality that included present-day Cudillero. During the Late Middle Ages, Cudillero remained a small fishing port, politically dependent on Pravia and ecclesiastically straddling the parishes of San Juan de Piñera and Santa María de Piñera.

By the 15th century, Cudillero had solidified its role as a fishing hub and sought to monopolize the salt trade, then controlled by Pravia. This concession, however, was never granted.

In the Early Modern period, Cudillero emerged as Asturias' central fishing port. Notable structures from this era include the Church of San Pedro, built by its inhabitants, a port quay, and the Castle of San Juan, constructed to defend against English raids.

In the 18th century, residents offered 1,000 doubloons to secede from Pravia’s jurisdiction, as they lacked autonomy in appointing local officials. This independence would not materialize for another century. At the time, the only feudal territory in the area was San Pedro de Boca de Mar, controlled by the House of Omaña.

19th Century Onward

The 19th century brought Cudillero its long-awaited municipal autonomy, driven in part by the port’s growing significance. Plans to expand the port emerged, though these would not be realized until the 20th century.

In the 20th century, construction of a new port was approved, with work carried out in phases and completed by the 1980s. The road connecting to Galicia was also modernized.

In 1995, Cudillero won the inaugural edition of TVE’s Grand Prix del verano (Summer Grand Prix) competition.

== Coat of arms ==
(See image at right)

- Top left: Arms of the Pravia family.
- Top right: Arms of the Omaña family.
- Bottom: A reference to the Church of San Pedro.

== Way of Saint James ==
The Way of Saint James, named The Northern Way (Camino de la Costa) passes through Cudillero. There is also a Pilgrim Heritage Hostal: Albergue de Peregrinos «Soto de Luiña» - Soto de Luiña, s/n – 3156-Cudillero with 20 Beds. Phone 985-59.00.03

== Politics ==
Year	PSOE	PP	IU-BA	Others	Total
2003	10	2	1	0	13
2007	10	3	0	0	13

== Parishes ==
Cudillero has nine parishes (administrative divisions):

- Ballota (Val.louta)
- Cudillero (Cuideiru)
- Faedo
- Novellana
- Oviñana (Ouviñana)
- Piñera
- San Juan de Piñera (San Xuan de Piñera)
- San Martín de Luiña (Samartín de Lluiña)
- Soto de Luiña (Soutu Lluiña)

== Demography ==
Source: Instituto Nacional de Estadística de España

== Gallery ==
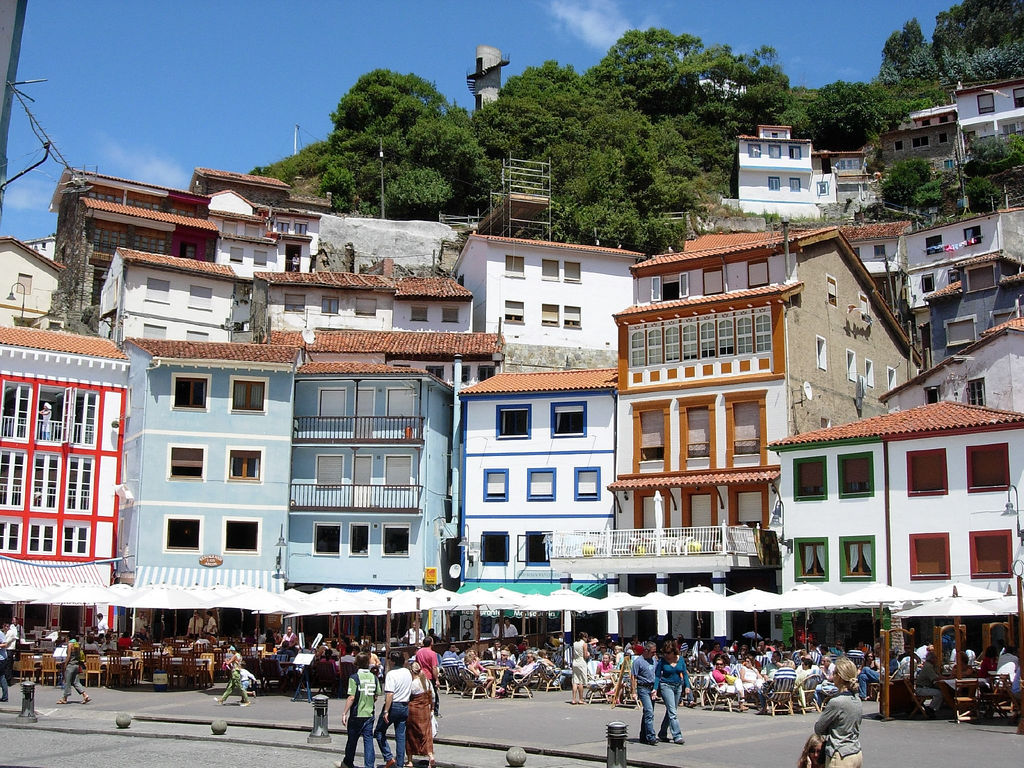
Seafood Restaurants in Cudillero

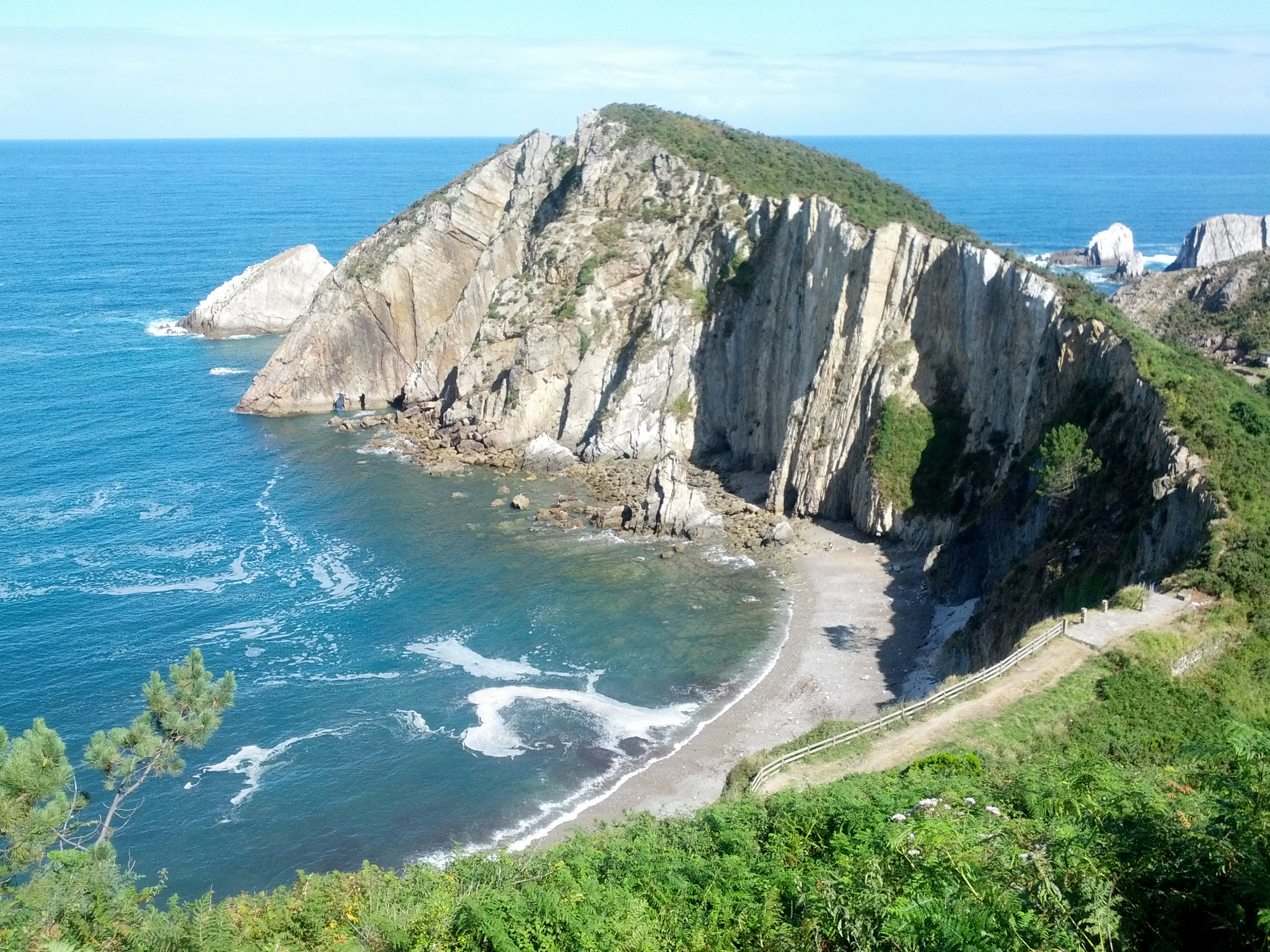
The Silence beach

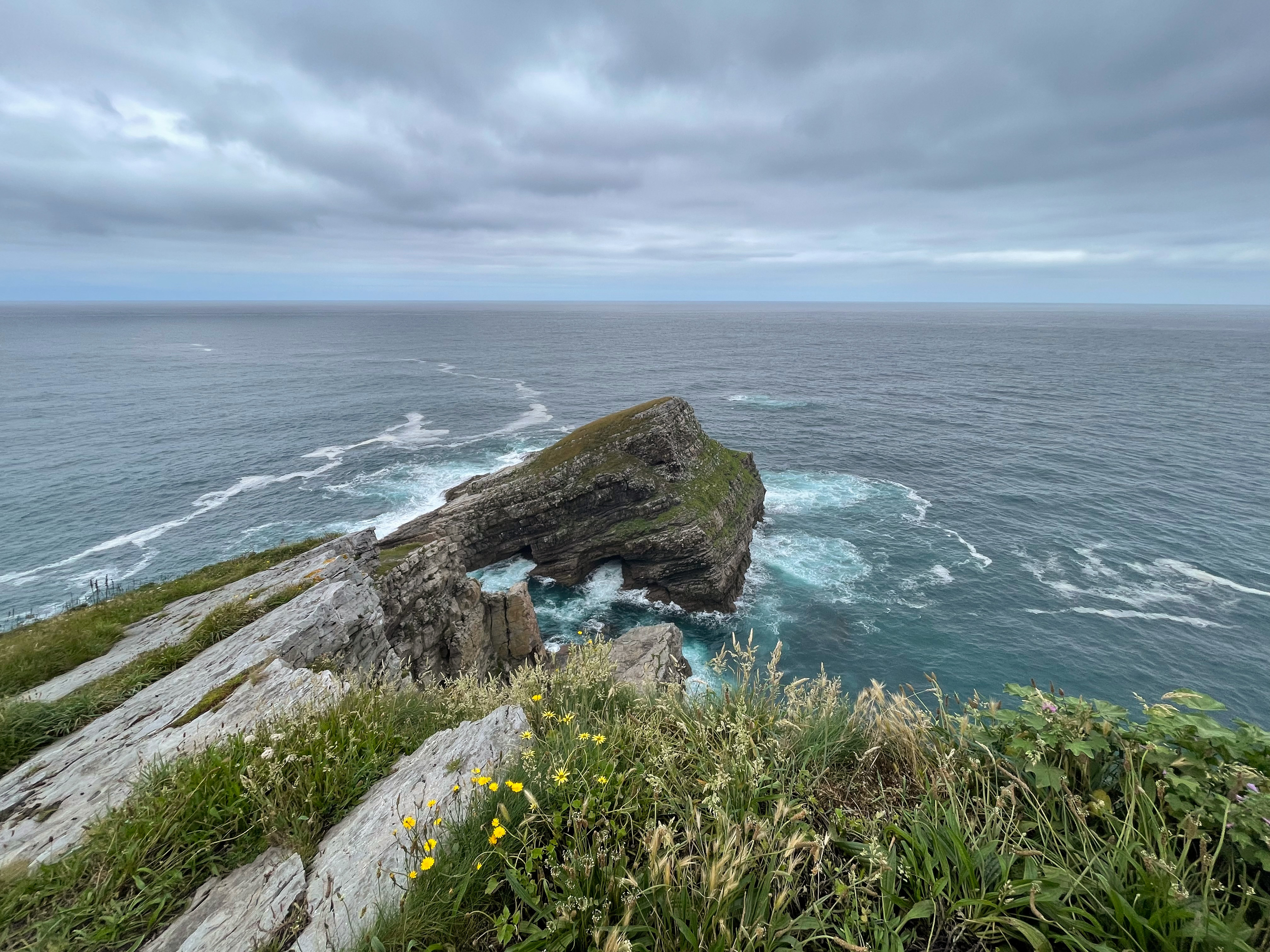
Cape Vidio

== See also ==
- List of municipalities in Asturias
