= Piñera (surname) =

Piñera is a Hispanic surname. Notable people with the surname include:

Piñera family

- Bernardino Piñera (1915–2020), Chilean prelate of the Catholic Church
- José Piñera Carvallo (1917–1991), Chilean engineer, diplomat and politician. His sons include:
- José Piñera (born 1948), Chilean economist
- Miguel Piñera (1954–2025), Chilean celebrity
- Sebastián Piñera (1949–2024), Chilean businessman and President (2010–2014, 2018–2022)

Others

- Antonia Is Piñera (born 1966), Spanish football defender
- Eva Piñera (born 1974), Spanish swimmer
- Gerardo Carrera Piñera (born 1987), Spanish football player
- Isma Piñera (born 1977), Spanish football player
- Juan Piñera (born 1949), Cuban musician
- Mike Pinera (1948–2024), American guitarist
- Virgilio Piñera (1912–1979), Cuban author
