= Pablo Puente Aparicio =

Spanish architect (1945–2020)

Pablo Fernando Puente Aparicio (Valladolid, 24 July 1945 – Valladolid, 11 April 2020) was a Spanish architect and university professor. He was known, among other professional work, for being the architect of the first nine editions of the famous exhibition "Las Edades del Hombre" and for his teaching work at the Higher Technical School of Architecture of Valladolid (ETSAV).

== Biography ==
Pablo Puente was born in 1946 in Valladolid (Spain). He had three sisters (María del Carmen, María Teresa and María Jesús) and a brother (José Enrique).

In Candelario (Salamanca, Spain), a municipality in the Sierra de Béjar region, he met María del Castañar Domínguez, whom he would later marry. For this and other reasons, from his youth, and for the rest of his life, he was always closely linked to Béjar.

With María del Castañar he had four children: a daughter (also called María del Castañar and architect) and three sons (Pablo, Fernando and José Enrique).

He studied Architecture at the Higher Technical School of Architecture of Madrid. Given his intellectual and professional concerns, he later decided to enroll in Valladolid in the Geography and History class, whose degree he obtained in 1987.

During the COVID-19 pandemic in Spain, Pablo Puente was infected with SARS-CoV-2. On March 16, 2020, two days after the Spanish Government decreed a nationwide state of alarm (which implied a mandatory home confinement for all citizens), Pablo Puente was admitted to the intensive care unit of the Río Hortega Hospital in Valladolid. He died on April 11, aged 74.

== Career ==
After obtaining the title of Architect in Madrid, in 1972 he was registered in the Official College of Architects of Valladolid.

=== Teaching career ===
From 1973 to 1975, at the ETSAV, he was a non-permanent professor of Analysis of Architectural Forms (first year).

From 1989 to 1999, at the ETSAV, he was associate professor of History of Art and Architecture (second year).

=== Architecture ===
Since 1972, Puente worked as an architect. In this activity he devoted himself mainly to projects and facultative directions of restorations and exhibitions. Among his works were the restoration of the Saldañuela palace in Sarracín (Burgos), the reconstruction of the Santa María de Valbuena monastery (Valladolid), the restoration of the West wing of the Monastery of Santa Clara la Real (Murcia), the extension of the College of Agustinas (Valladolid), the restoration of the basement of the Episcopal Palace of Astorga (León), the creation of the temporary exhibition hall and museum reform of the Salzillo Museum (Murcia), the projects to expand the cemetery and of consolidation and restoration of the remains of Mucientes Castle.

As an organizer of exhibitions, he did not limit himself to projecting and supervising their execution, but published many articles and books on the subject, to the point of creating "a true school on how to mount exhibitions". Among all his exhibitions, the most famous was the series "Las Edades del Hombre", of which he was the author, coordinator and director of the first nine editions (although some sources indicate that there were ten). The first of them was located in the Valladolid Cathedral in 1988. It is also worth highlighting the realization of another in Antwerp (Belgium), in 1995. As a result of the organization of the first in the Valladolid cathedral, a close friendship emerged with the priest José Velicia as well as with the future winner of the Miguel de Cervantes Prize and future director of the newspaper El Norte de Castilla José Jiménez Lozano, which only their death would end.

In addition to the previously mentioned and better known series of exhibitions, Pablo Puente was also in charge of others, such as " Las mujeres en la Guerra Civil ", in Salamanca (1989), Málaga (1990) and Oviedo (1992); " Una hora de España ", in Madrid (1994), in commemoration of the seventh centenary of the Complutense University; "Sacras moles", in Barcelona (1996), on the construction and restoration of the twelve existing cathedrals in Castilla y León; "La Navidad en palacio", in the Royal Palace of Madrid (1998), about the nativity scene of Salzillo; «Huellas», in the Murcia Cathedral (2002); the museum installation of the Diocesan Museum of the Cathedral of Guadix (Granada), in 2002.

=== Publications ===
Among the works he published throughout his professional life, the most important are:

- San Bernardo vibra en cursi. Published in Hoja del Lunes de Valladolid. 1982.
- La catedral de Valladolid. Desconocida, infrautilizada e infravalorada. Published in El Norte de Castilla. 1989.
- Los montajes de las Edades. Published in Anuario de Castilla y León. Editorial Ámbito, 1993.
- La arquitectura del montaje. Catalogue of the exhibit «La Iglesia en América. Evangelización y cultura» in the Vatican pavilion of the Seville Expo. 1992.
- Una bella ermita de palabras, part of José Jiménez Lozano, premio nacional de las letras. Published by the Spanish Ministry of Culture. 1994.
- El teatro de Zorrilla de Valladolid, part of José Velicia. In memoriam. Published by Caja Duero. 2002.
- Historias de Candelario. 2016.

=== Conferences ===
Among his many presentations, congresses, seminars and conferences, the most important were:

- «El legado de Mateo Hernández» (1985), at the University of Valladolid.
- The conference «La protección de yacimientos y áreas arqueológicas» (1991), in the seminar «Recuperación arquitectónica y valoración arqueológica», as associate professor of the Fifth postgraduate course «Restauración arquitectónica» of the Higher Technical School of Architecture of Valladolid.
- He was coordinator of the seminar «Historia de las formas y procedimientos arquitectónicos» in postgraduate courses VII and VIII entitled "Architectural Restoration", of the Higher Technical School of Architecture of Valladolid (1993 and 1994, respectively).
- «Diálogo entre arte e industria en los montajes de exposiciones» (1994), during the Technical Conference of the III Biennial of Architecture and Urbanism, in Zaragoza.
- Plenary conference entitled «Huellas. Historia y decoro» (2014), at the First National Congress of Young Art Historians, at the University of Murcia.

=== Awards ===
- Pro Ecclesia et Pontifice Cross, 1993.
- Golden Medal of the Bishopry of Antwerp, 1995.
- Racimo de oro Prize of Architecture. Serrada (Valladolid), 1996.
- Gold Badge of the Official College of Architects of León, 1999.

=== Other work ===
From 1975 to 1977, Puente was an interim IRYDA official in the Duero Regional Inspectorate.

He belonged to the Real Academia de Bellas Artes de San Fernando, of which he was a corresponding academic in Castilla and León.

He was president of the Valladolid delegation of the Official College of Architects of Madrid (years 1986 to 1988).

He produced a number of audiovisuals, such as: "El metarrealismo de Adolfo Sarabia" (1985), screened that year at ARCO, and Instrumentos musicales en las portadas de las iglesias , conceived for the exhibition "La música en la Iglesia de Castilla y León" held in León in 1991. He was also screenwriter and coordinator of the video broadcast for the exhibition " La ciudad de seis pisos" in El Burgo de Osma (Soria); co-author of the script, together with university professor Javier Rivera Blanco, and coordinator of the audiovisual "La arquitectura de la séptima iglesia" in the exhibition "La séptima iglesia", which took place in the year 2000 at the Gaudí Palace in Astorga (León); author of the script and coordinator of the audiovisual "Huellas" and the video with which the exhibition "Huellas" was promoted in 2002 in the Murcia Cathedral.
