= San Martín de Luiña =

- Parish
- Location within Spain
- Country: Spain
- Autonomous community: Asturias
- Province: Asturias
- Municipality: Cudillero

San Martín de Luiña is one of nine parishes (administrative divisions) in the Cudillero municipality, within the province and autonomous community of Asturias, in northern Spain.

The population is 987 (INE 2007).

== Villages ==
The villages of San Martín de Luiña include: Arbichera, Argatón, Artéu, La Bordinga, Brañaseca, Busfríu, Castañéu, El Cepéu, Cipieḷḷu, Esqueiru, Folgueirúa, Gallineiru, Los Gachuelos, Llamuñu, Ḷḷendepín, La Madalena, La Puerca, La Rondieḷḷa, Salamir, San Cosme, Teixidieḷḷu and Veiciella.
