= Valbuena de Duero =

Coordinates: 41°39′N 4°17′W

Valbuena de Duero, Spain
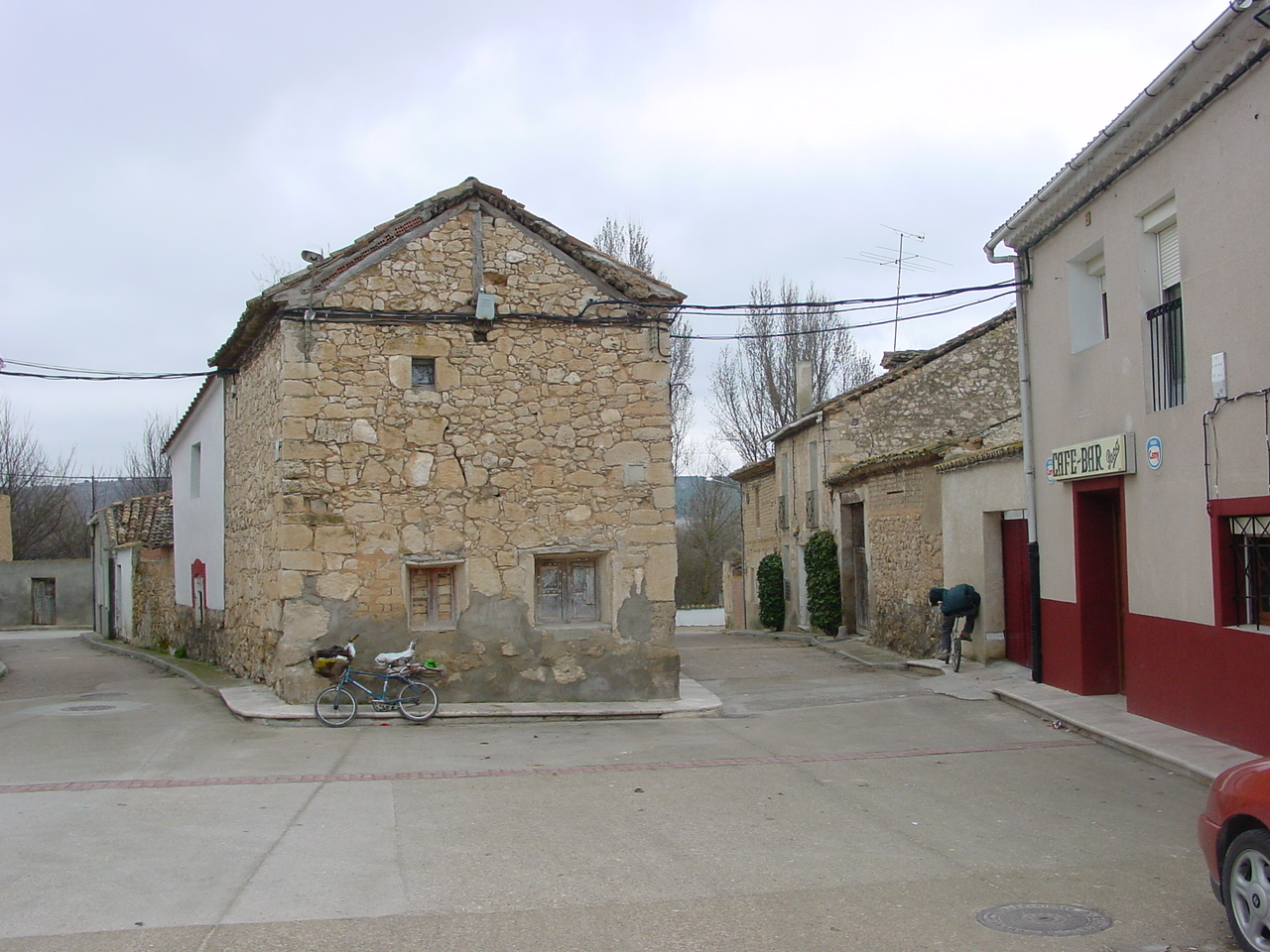
- street
- Country: Spain
- Autonomous community: Castile and León
- Province: Valladolid
- Municipality: Valbuena de Duero

Area
  - Total: 46 km^{2} (18 sq mi)

Population (2025-01-01)
  - Total: 385
  - Density: 8.4/km^{2} (22/sq mi)
- Time zone: UTC+1 (CET)
  - Summer (DST): UTC+2 (CEST)

Valbuena de Duero is a municipality located in the province of Valladolid, Castile and León, Spain. According to the 2004 census (INE), the municipality has a population of 502 inhabitants. The Church of San Andrés, a beautiful Romanesque church dating back to the 13th century, is a notable landmark.

== Villages ==
San Bernardo is a village within Valbuena de Duero municipality. It was founded in the 1950s by the Instituto Nacional de Colonización. Its inhabitants came from Santa María de Poyos, a town in Guadalajara Province that was submerged by the waters of the Embalse de Buendía reservoir. Presently there is a Ribera del Duero DO wine cellar in San Bernardo named after the village.

The Valbuena Abbey is located within the limits of Valbuena de Duero municipality.
