= Church of San Andres (Cuellar) =

Catholic church in Segovia, Spain

Church of San Andrés
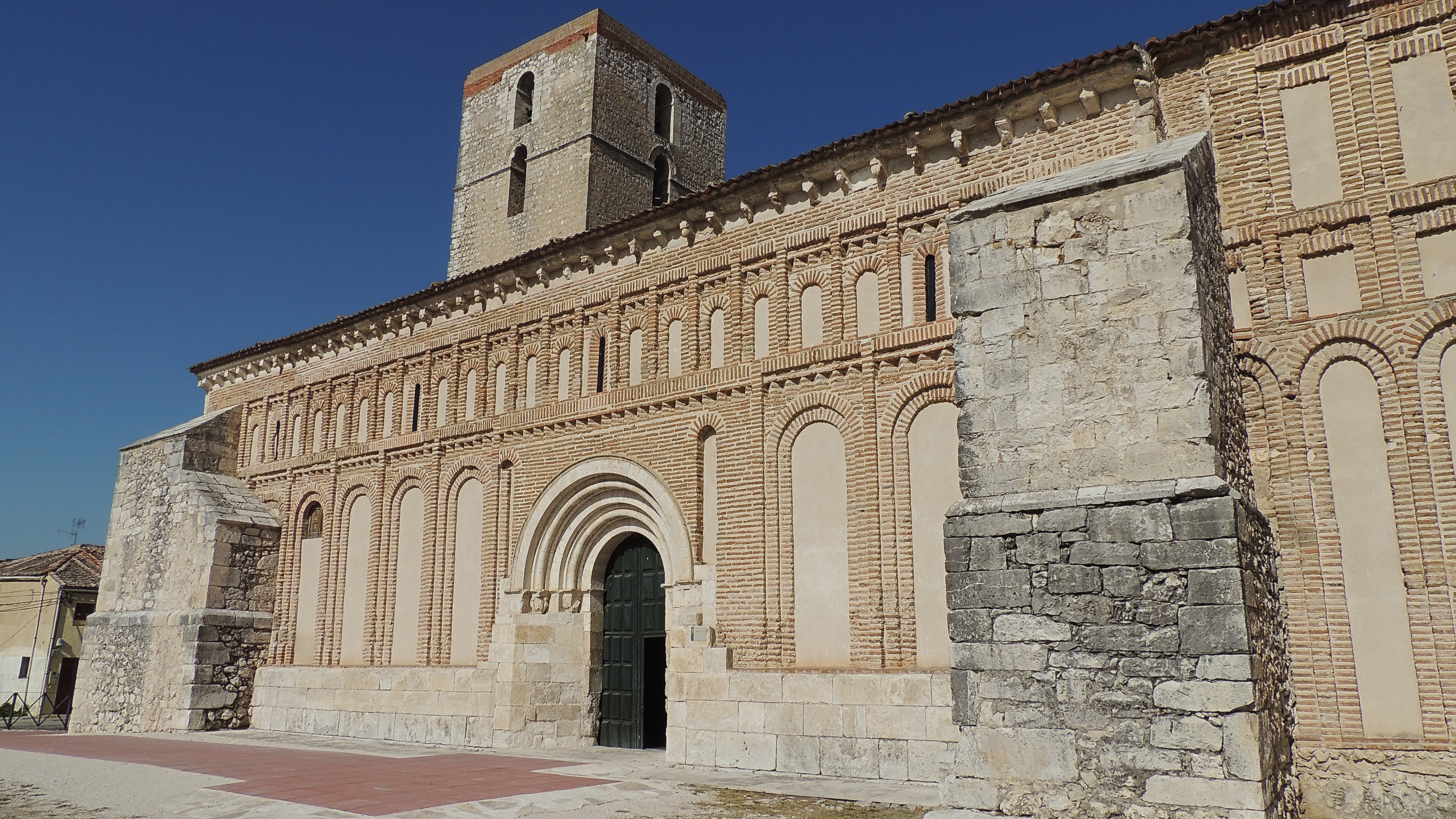
- Church of San Andrés
- 41°24′11″N 4°19′04″W
- Location: Cuéllar, Segovia, Castile and León
- Country: Spain
- Denomination: Catholic Church

History
- Status: Church
- Dedication: Andrew the Apostle

Architecture
- Architectural type: Church architecture
- Style: Mudéjar; Romanesque
- Groundbreaking: 13th century
- Completed: 1994 (restoration)

Administration
- Archdiocese: Valladolid
- Diocese: Segovia

The Church of San Andrés is a Catholic church located in the town of Cuéllar, province of Segovia, in the autonomous community of Castile and León, Spain. Located outside the walls of the town and in the neighborhood to which it gives its name, during the Middle Ages it was the head of a small suburb that over time merged with the town.

Dating back to the 13th century, although, of earlier construction, it was built in stone and brick masonry, over a previous Romanesque ashlar building, of which it preserves a plinth on its main façade, as well as the front of the same façade and the Gate of San Andrés. Despite the various modifications suffered over time, it retains its original layout, reaffirmed with a complete restoration carried out during 1989–1994, after being declared a Bien de Interés Cultural in 1982.

It is, without a doubt, the best example of Cuellar's Mudejar style and, in the opinion of the architect and historian Vicente Lampérez y Romea, has the best church plan of this style. It consists of a wide central nave and two smaller ones, with a triple apse decorated with a series of blind semicircular arches, framed windows, and friezes of angled arches.

Inside are several Mudejar frescoes, a Muslim-inspired stone door, and a large collection of sculptures, including images of the Christ of San Gil, the Virgin of La Rochela, and a Byzantine-styleIt has been throughout its history one of the most important parishes of the town, and therefore in the late eighteenth century the parishes of San Martin and San Gil were merged into this one, becoming a single parish. Nowadays it receives weekly worship and is one of the main points of the Holy Week in Cuéllar.

== Description ==
=== External structure ===
- Building

Its main doorway on the west side is a true filigree of Mudejar art. It is undoubtedly the best example of mudejar Cuellar, and is raised on a previous one, of Romanesque style. Five rows of bricks are raised from the ground, with their respective very cambered threads. On both sides, blind semicircular arches that reach the eaves complete the ensemble, all over a Romanesque doorway that preserves its respective columns and historiated capitals, dating from the beginning of the 13th century.

In the threshold, there are three prolonged brick apses, the main one being larger and more protruding, with two blind semicircular arcades in the middle; and in the upper one, two orders of windows with frames, separated by simple friezes of angled brick that are interrupted in the protruding panels. The lateral apses reduce their windows in favor of the upper arches and suppress the saw-toothed windows due to the lower overall height.

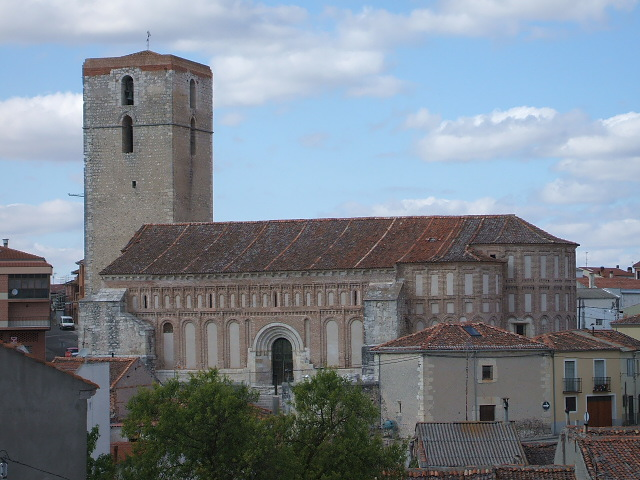
View of the temple from the Plaza de San Gil

On the south façade is a stone doorway with five archivolts with bull moldings. It has a stone cornice with corbels, and the entire upper part is decorated with blind arches and friezes of angled arches.

The primitive tower was located on the opposite side from the present one and is preserved lowered to the height of the roof, occupying the sacristy of the church. The present one, located on the northwest side, is a sober tower, built in masonry and ashlar, with the corners elaborated with rope and chalk.

- Enclosure

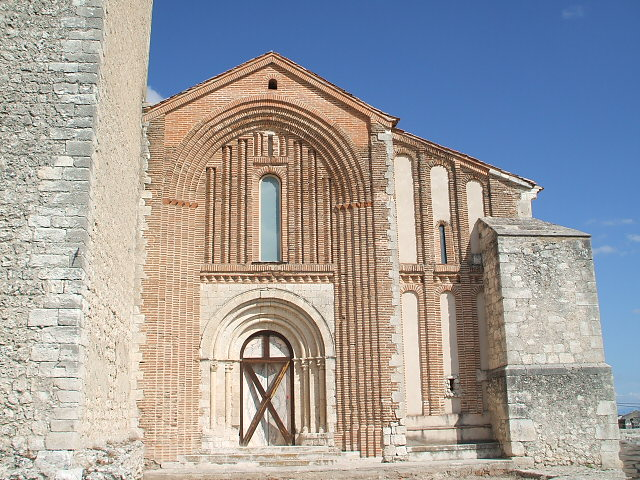
Gate of San Andrés

Using a retaining wall, the environment of San Andrés is collected, which is kept under its medieval cobblestones the cemetery of its parish. In front of the main door of the temple, there is a 15th-century stone cross, topped at the base with a skull. Adjacent to the church was built in 1797 a bakery to store the tithes of the parish. Today the following Latin inscription can be seen above the door:

Sub imperio domini nostri caroli iv hancine sancto andreae apostolo dicatam pareciam d. antonio a saez regente haec decumatum cela ad ea condena est extructa anno domini 1797.

=== Interior structure ===
It consists of three naves and four bays; one of them serves as a transept without protruding to the exterior and is slightly wider than the others.

- Mudejar coffered ceiling

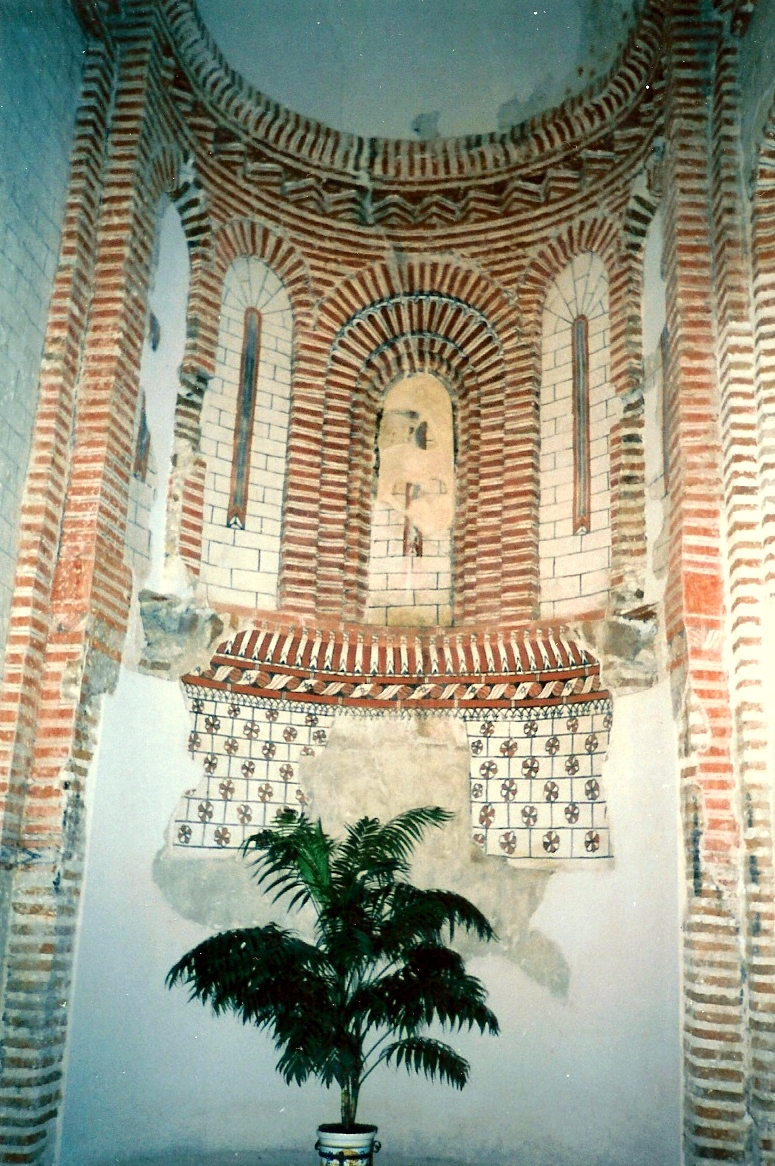
Mudejar frescoes in the interior

Fortunately, the original Mudejar coffered ceiling, in the form of a trough, of the central nave is still hidden. Sixteen double beams and two single beams cross the nave. All of them have their corresponding carved medallions with scroll designs. Only in some of the boards that cover the openings, Mudejar details can be perceived. Over the Mudejar coffered ceiling, a Baroque vault was built, which is currently hidden under another, barrel vault, of 19th-century plasterwork, as is recalled by an inscription located on the arch of the central nave, which reads "Hízose esta obra siendo cura D. Isidoro Ibáñez Alonso, por Clemente Mesón. Año 1818" (This work was done when D. Isidoro Ibáñez Alonso was the priest, by Clemente Mesón. Year 1818").

- Pictorial decoration

It still conserves frescoes of Mudejar's work in the lateral apses, and perhaps also in the main one, hidden behind the main altarpiece. They present a geometric decoration, as well as simulate the bricks and windows of the apse, in white, red, black, and blue tones. They were restored at the end of the 20th century and are perfectly consolidated.

== Altarpieces ==
- High Altarpiece

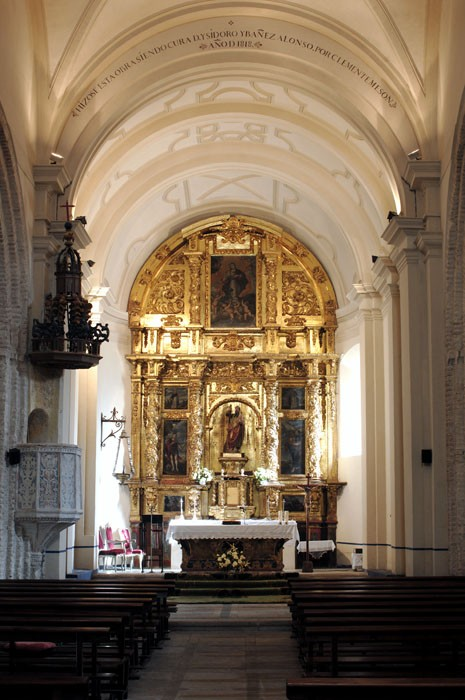
Central nave and altarpiece of the main altar of the church

From an inventory of the year 1668, we know that the main altarpiece was still conserved; however, in 1716 the present altarpiece appears. It was built at the end of the 17th century. On April 28, 1698, Sebastián de la Puerta, Juan Miren Fernández, and Pedro Capuchín, master gilders from Valladolid, undertook to gild the new altarpiece.

It has a baroque style, of carving, with Solomonic columns and all of it gilded. It is dedicated to San Andrés, whose effigy occupies the center of the same one. Around it are distributed seven canvases, which are represented, from left to right, San José, San Juan Evangelista, Santo Domingo de Guzmán, Santa Catalina, San Pedro, and Santa Teresa de Jesús. Crowning the set, the Immaculate Conception.

- Collateral altarpieces

On both sides of the central nave, there are two baroque altarpieces that house carvings of artistic interest, some of which come from the church of San Martín, which arrived here at the end of the 18th century when the parishes were annexed.

== Chapels ==
- Chapel of the Virgen de las Candelas

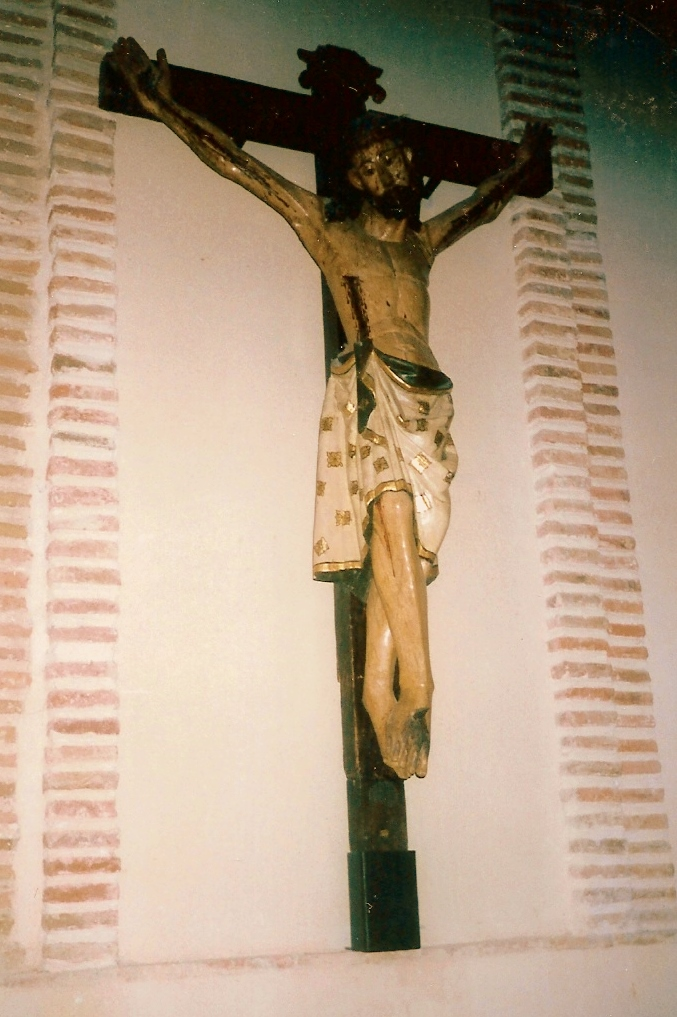
Christ of San Gil

Located in the right nave, it has an altarpiece that also belongs to the Baroque. It is dedicated to Our Lady and houses the image of the Virgen de las Candelas. It is a Romanesque image, made of wood, in a seated position and with a serene face, covered with a golden mantle and decorated in blue, being its original polychrome. The hands in an attitude of holding between them a child that has disappeared. It is believed that it is a copy of another one that existed in the Monastery of Santa María de la Armedilla, and that the Dukes of Alburquerque had it made for their convenience since when the primitive was moved to the main nave of said monastery (in 1552), they were deprived of seeing it directly from their room. For the Fiesta de las Candelas (Feast of the Candles), the image is dressed in 19th-century clothing, a mantle and toquilla of the same period, and a headdress on the face. In the upper part of the altar a canvas of the Annunciation is contemplated, and at its base is placed the image of St. John the Evangelist.

- Chapel of the Christ of San Gil

It houses the image of a Romanesque Christ of the 14th century, which presided over the old church of San Gil, which gives it its name, and to which the people in Cuéllar profess a great devotion. According to what can be read on a plaque, the bishop of Segovia Fernando de Guzmán y Portocarrero granted 1690 forty days of indulgence to all the people who visited the Christ or who gave alms for oil or wax. It is one of the images that participate in the Holy Week.

== Baroque organ ==
The church organ is located at the back of the church, next to the choir. It is perfectly documented; it was built in 1843 by Julián Azura García, a master organ builder present in the provinces of Segovia and Burgos. It is a baroque-style piece and has a handwritten inscription on the wind chest, which reads "This organ was made by Julián Azuara. Being priest Don Isidoro Ibáñez Alonso. In the year 1843"

It was intervened importantly in 1919 by Mariano Velázquez, organ builder of Arévalo, who changed the air system of the piece. At the end of the 20th century, it was dismantled during the restoration of the church and was not put back in its place. It remained dismantled until 2012 when it was placed next to the choir after being completely restored a year earlier by the Jesuit Fermín Trueba. On the occasion of the intervention, it was inaugurated with an organ concert the same year.

It was originally located above the choir, on a raised platform that was removed in the last restoration of the building to leave a Mudejar arch visible. After the restoration of the musical piece, it was placed next to the choir, as it was impossible to put it back in its original place.

== Sacristy ==
The walnut chest of drawers, from the beginning of the 18th century, was the work of Eusebio Baños, assembler of the bishop of Segovia, who charged 4800 reales for it. Above it is an image of St. Joseph and two carvings of the Child Jesus. The chest of drawers is crowned by a wooden Christ of regular size. In addition, we can find, among other pieces, an architectural ewer, dated 1779, but imitating the Renaissance, with its bronze key, the work of Frutos Fraile, a local master mason; a carved silver parish cross, a silver censer, and a ciborium, a naveta of the same metal with its spoon for the censer, the work of the Valladolid silversmith Sebastián Francisco de Miranda, the silver rods of the brotherhood of San Cristóbal de la Encina and various liturgical vestments from the 17th to the 20th centuries.

== Museum ==
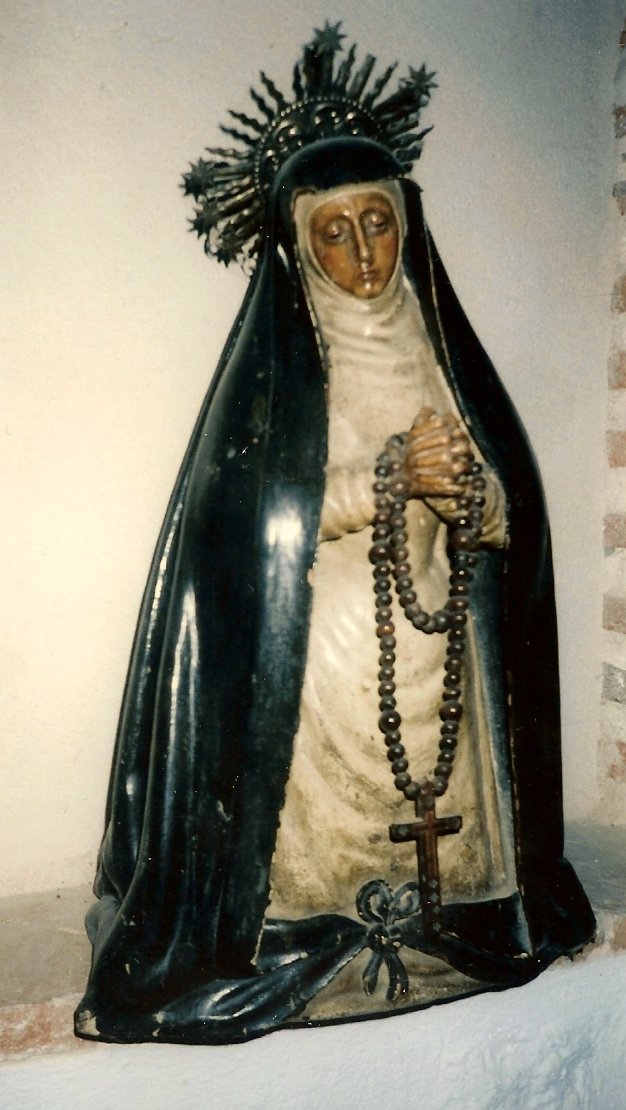
Our Lady of Sorrows

In front of the main door, and to the left side of the sacristy, we find a stone lobed arch that immediately reminds us of the Mosque of Córdoba, of clear Muslim influence. It does not belong to the complex, and taking into account that the council militias of Cuéllar participated actively in the reconquest of Andalusia, it is possible that it was brought to the town as spoils of war.

Behind it there is a room, originally a granary where the church's wheat was kept, and later a storehouse. After the restoration of the church, it was conditioned to locate the pieces that were stored, to put them in value. The collection includes 20 carvings and other items, such as an ungilded and unpainted neoclassical altarpiece, a nineteenth-century wooden showcase, a confessional and various vestments. It stands out among the images of a praying Dolorosa, kneeling and wearing a mantle that folds at the bottom and is gathered in front in the form of a bow. She carries between her hands a wooden rosary with mother-of-pearl inlay; also interesting is a carving of San Roque.

== Other works of art ==
=== Virgen de la Rochela ===
The Virgen de la Rochela is of late Gothic style and great artistic merit, her blonde hair and blue eyes make her unique in the region. Her gold-trimmed mantle still retains the original polychromy. It is of French origin, possibly from the city of La Rochelle, and comes from the old convent of San Basilio, where it had an altar in the main chapel, on the Gospel side. Legend has it that once in Cuéllar it was taken to the Dukes of Alburquerque, who, after drawing lots, deposited it in San Basilio.

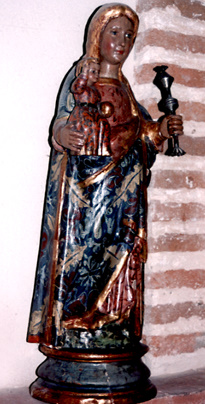
Virgen de la Rochela

There it remained on the throne of its rich chapel, full of jewels and ornaments, until the extinction of the monastery, transferring it to the church of San Miguel, where it was kept until the end of 1814 when it was transferred to the church of San Andrés.

This image had a pedestal, perhaps similar to the one that the image of Nuestra Señora del Henar had in silver, which was stolen by the French. It also carried two silver crowns, one for the Child and the other for the Virgin, who was dressed with a mantle and carried a scepter in her hand, as the document of the transfer from San Basilio to San Miguel reminds us:

...an effigy of Our Lady of La Rochela, with her silver crown, Child and her crown of the same, with a scepter also of silver that Our Lady has in her hand... a golden pedestal with a child Jesus of Our Lady of La Rochela... Cuéllar, December 4, 1814.

Both the crowns and the base were stolen at the end of the 19th century. The Virgen de la Rochela was one of the most venerated Marian images of Cuéllar and its land, to which countless miracles are attributed.

=== Calvary of Cristo de la Encina ===
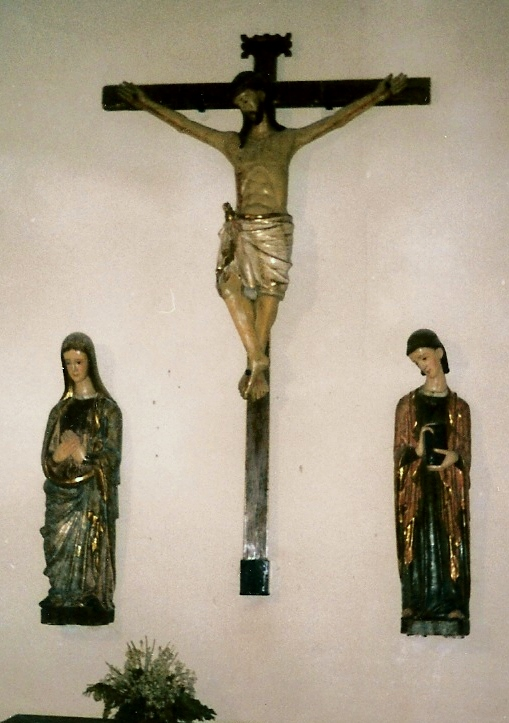
Byzantine-style calvary

In the front of the north nave is located perhaps the most important piece preserved in the church: a Byzantine style Calvary dated around 1300. The faces of the Virgin and Saint John, slightly inclined, show a compassionate gentleness before the image of Christ Crucified, called this one of the Encina, to which great devotion is professed.

It is made of polychrome wood; the image of Christ Crucified measures almost two meters, and those of the Virgin and St. John reach 1.60 m. It is an artistic piece of great value, considered one of the best pieces of the heritage of the Church in Castilla y León, and was the main piece of the exhibition of Las Edades del Hombre entitled "Art in the Church of Castilla y León", held in Valladolid in 1988–1989. Because of this, it was restored in its entirety.

== Celebrations ==
It is open for worship as a branch of the parish church of San Miguel, and mass is celebrated once a week. In addition, other dates are celebrated:

- Fiesta de San Andres: is celebrated on November 30, with a mass in his honor and some activities promoted by the residents of the neighborhood that bears his name, as well as by the restaurateurs, who hold a contest-tasting of various tapas, the "Tapas de San Andrés".
- Fiesta de las Candelas: it is celebrated on February 2, and after dressing the Virgin, the brothers of the "Hermandad de Nuestra Señora de las Candelas" procession her through the streets of the neighborhood to the sound of dulzaina and tamboril. The women carry candles, and the stewardess must carry a curly one with a red ribbon tied to it. The brotherhood is composed of twelve brothers or rods, six incoming and six outgoing, with the obligation for each of them to be accompanied by their spouse, daughter, or relative. Once the procession is over, the brothers and all those attending celebrate a snack at the butler's house.
- Holy Week: On Holy Wednesday, the Way of the Cross departs from this church and goes to the church of San Miguel; the eight brotherhoods of the town participate in it, carrying their banners. There is also a procession of a crucified Christ from the church of Santa María de la Cuesta.

The day of Holy Thursday this temple has a greater interest, to keep within its walls the main piece of the procession: the Christ of San Gil, which is carried on a platform. He is accompanied by the Penitential Cross of the Brotherhood of Our Father Jesus of Nazareth and the Prayer in the Garden.

== Bibliography ==
- Benito y Durán, Ángel (1975). «Datos para la historia del monasterio basiliano de Ntra. Sra. de la Salud de Cuéllar». Estudios segovianos (79): 103–151
- Consejería de Cultura y Turismo, ed. (1995). Catálogo monumental de Castilla y León: bienes inmuebles declarados. Tomo II. Junta de Castilla y León.
- Jiménez Arribas, Javier (1999). Cuéllar (1.ª edición). Ámbito Ediciones.
- Tejero Cobos, Isidoro (1973). «Cuéllar, arte e historia». Estudios segovianos (74–75): 161–197
- Velasco Bayón, Balbino (1996). Historia de Cuéllar (4.ª edición). Diputación Provincial de Segovia.
