= Cudillero (parish) =

Cudillero Cuideiru
- Parish
- Location within Asturias Location within Spain
- Coordinates: 43.56°N 6.15°W
- Country: Spain
- Autonomous community: Asturias
- Province: Asturias
- Municipality: Cudillero

Population
  - Total: 1,622

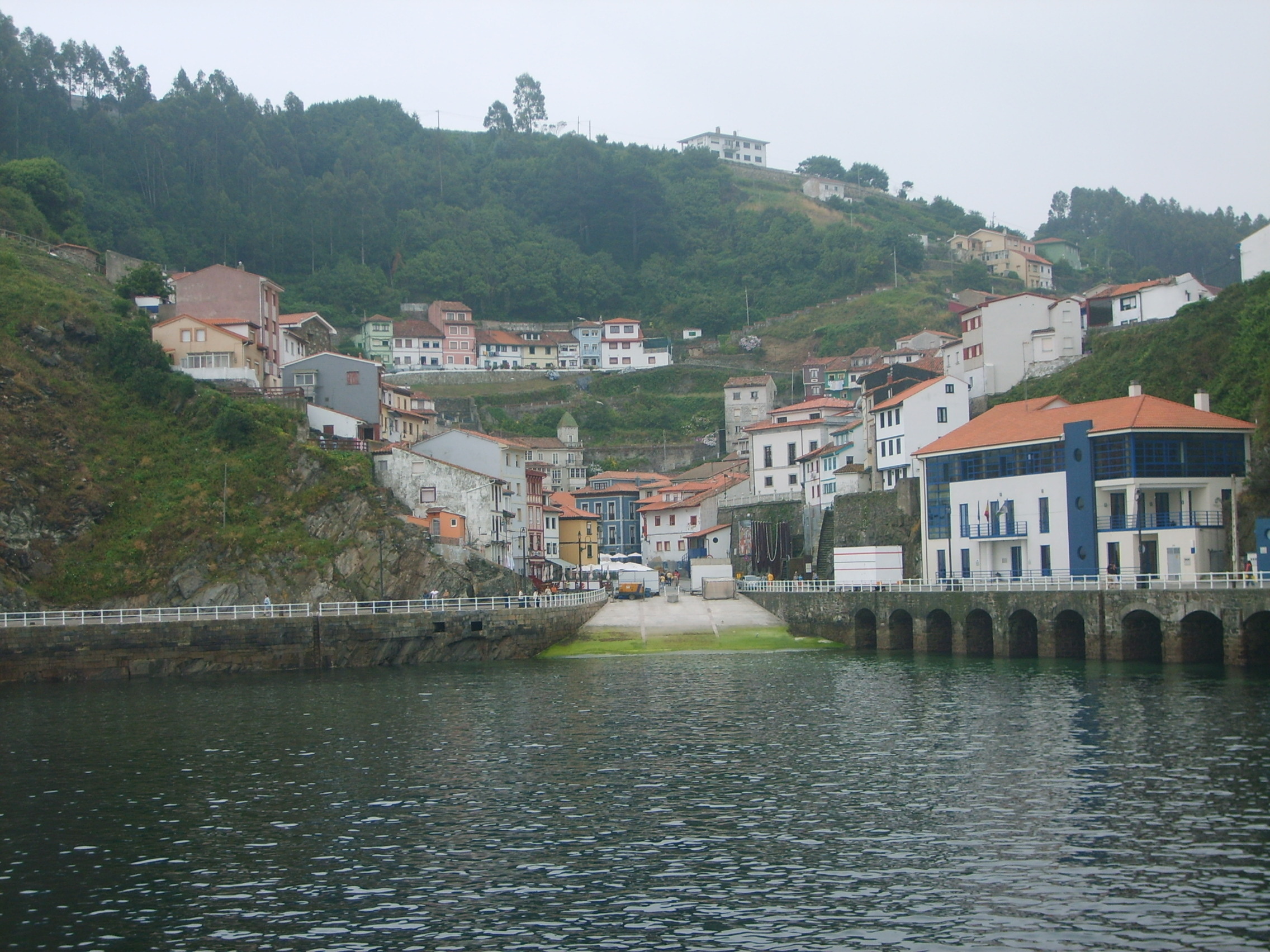
Cudillero

Cudillero (Asturian: Cuideiru) is one of nine parishes in the Cudillero municipality, within the province and autonomous community of Asturias, in northern Spain.

The population is 1,622.
