= Faedo (Cudillero) =

- Parish
- Location within Spain
- Country: Spain
- Autonomous community: Asturias
- Province: Asturias
- Municipality: Cudillero

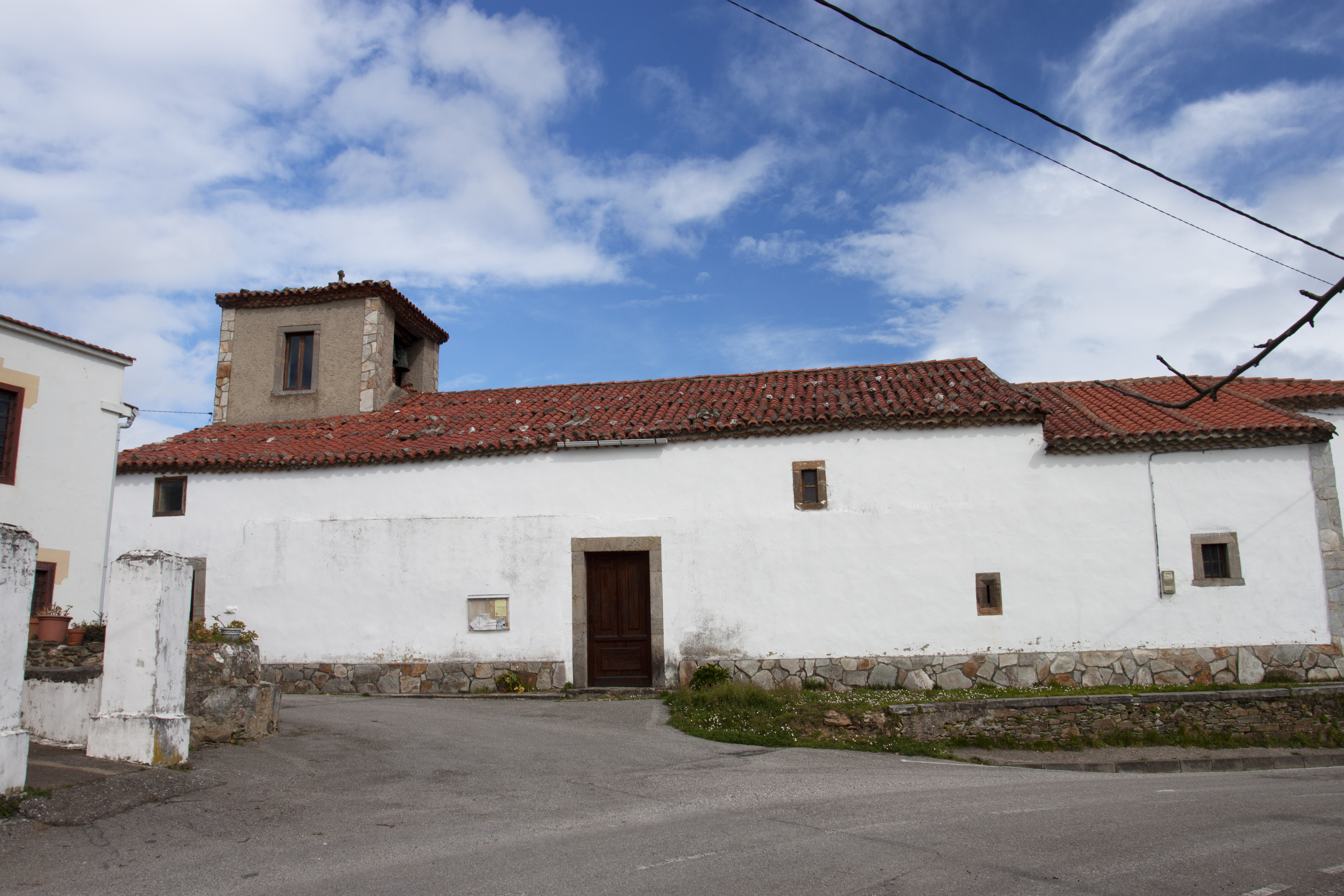

Faedo is one of nine parishes in the Cudillero municipality, within the province and autonomous community of Asturias, in northern Spain. The population is 147 (INE 2007).

== Villages ==
- Corollos
- La Fenosa
- Orderias
- La Tabla
- Villeirín
