= Oviñana (Cudillero) =

- Parish
- Location within Spain
- Country: Spain
- Autonomous community: Asturias
- Province: Asturias
- Municipality: Cudillero

Oviñana (Asturian Ouviñana) is one of nine parishes in the Cudillero municipality, within the province and autonomous community of Asturias, in northern Spain.

The population is 529 (INE 2007).

Oviñana is well known due to the Cape Vidio, which has a wonderful view of the Cantabrian Sea. The cape has 90 m (300 ft) cliffs, in which many sea birds live, such as seagulls or cormorants. There are also many beaches. The best-known beaches in the village are Vallina, El Sablón, Gayo, El Gayín, Cueva, Peñadoria, Gradas, San Cidiellu, Maurieyu, Purtiella, Puerto Chico and Castrillón.

There are many festivities in Oviñana, but the most important ones are the Carnival ("Antroxu"), celebrated in February; La Jira, the first weekend in July; and San Roque, 15–17 August.

== Neighbourhoods ==
- Rieguabaxu (Riego Abajo)
- Rieguarriba (Riego Arriba)
- Vivíu (Vivigo)
