= Langa, Spain =

Langa
- Municipality
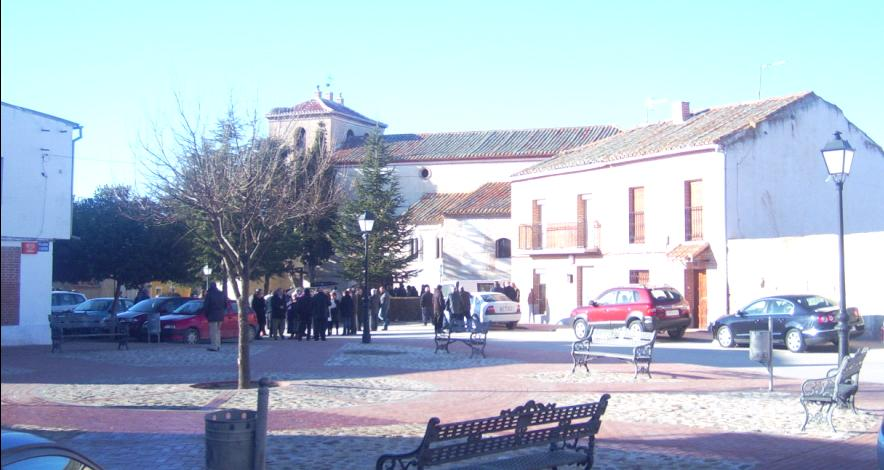
- Plaza de la Constitución en Langa

- Flag Coat of arms

- Location in Spain. Langa (Castile and León)
- Coordinates: 41°00′28″N 4°51′34″W
- Country: Spain
- Autonomous community: Castile and León
- Province: Ávila

Area
  - Total: 24.45 km^{2} (9.44 sq mi)
- Elevation: 865 m (2,838 ft)

Population (2025-01-01)
  - Total: 441
- Website: Official website

Langa is a township and municipality in the province of Ávila (autonomous community Castile and León).

== History ==
Premises belonging to the area called The Moraña is repopulated from 1085, with people coming from the North Peninsula. In the village of Narros settled down and took possession of the land surrounding the Cardenas family.

Langa was one of four places in this area and those who had just left him. The others are:

- Valtodano Between Langa and the Sauza Source, on the shores of what is still a creek in times of heavy rainfall. The place is known anecdote that some guards on horseback chasing a criminal, but while passing through the source, where there was an area of 'quicksand' the culprit is not spent running and nothing happened, but the guards and their horses sunk in them.
- Narros Between Lange and Magaz. It says that is 'stick' of the council went to Langa, and knew that most people who had lived there. You can see the ruins of the church and some houses nearby plant, and the remains of the foundations for what should be a small bridge. It was founded by the family during Cárdenas restocking after the expulsion of the Arabs. The area should be next to a wetland fed by a stream which formed a gap. Latest is that it knows what the fishing, which had a small dam, which at its name would have been even place some type of fishing.
- Garciávalo that comes from Álvarado García. Between Langa and Villanueva del Aceral. There is a watering hole around which are found many remains of what could be materials from which the nucleus was built there.

== Population ==
Historical population
Year	Pop.	±% p.a.
2023	440	—
2024	450	+2.27%
2025	441	−2.00%
Source: INE

== Personalities ==
- José Jiménez Lozano (1930), writer

== Government ==
From 2023 until 2027, the mayor of Langa is Diego Nava Yuguero.
