= Cape Vidio =

Cape in Spain

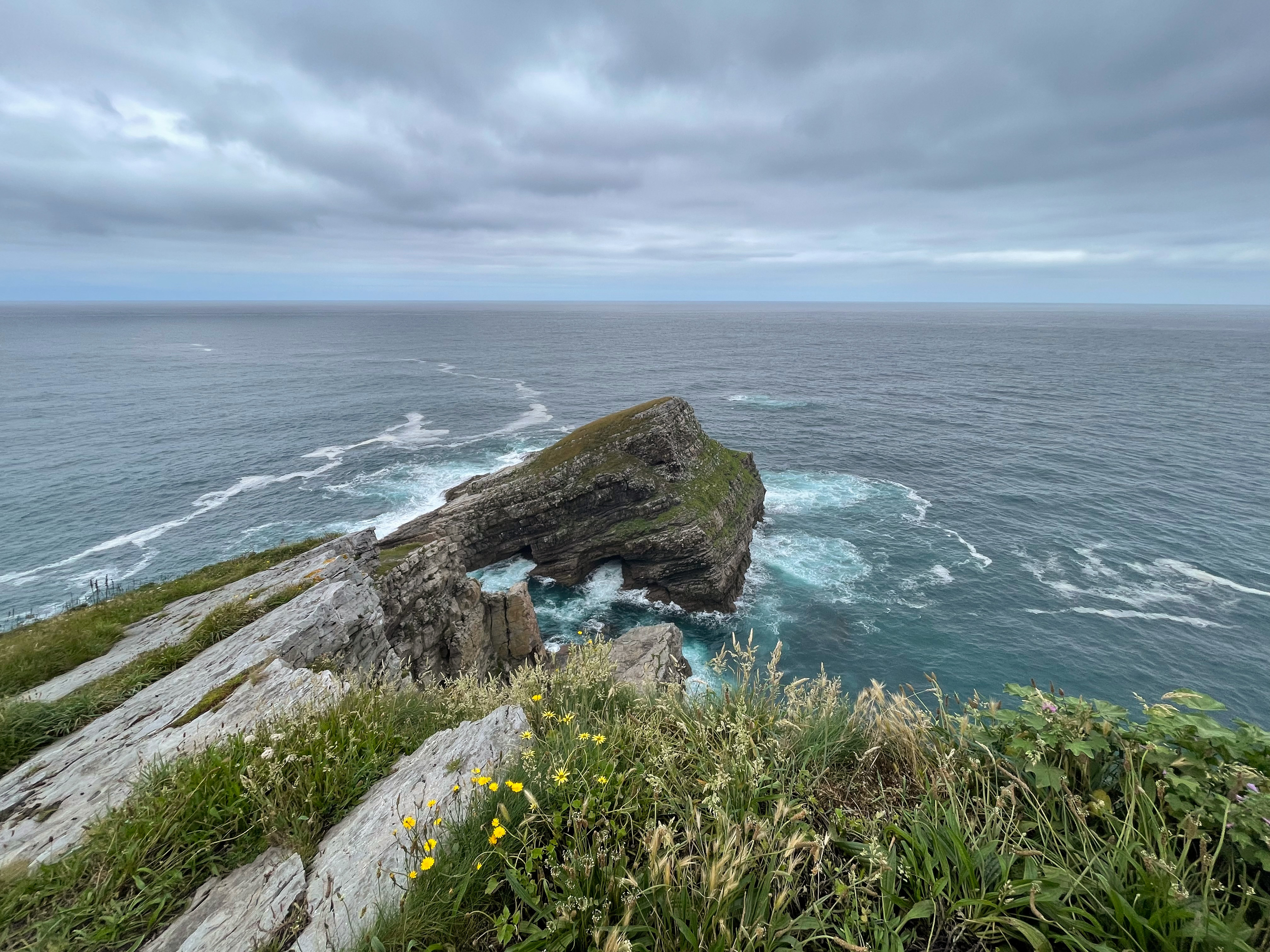
- The extreme point of Cape Vidio

- Location within Spain

Geography
- Location: Cantabrian Sea (Atlantic Ocean)
- Coordinates: 43°35′36″N 6°14′35″W

Administration
- Spain
- Autonomous Community: Asturias
- Municipality: Cudillero

Cape Vidio is a prominent cape located on the Asturian coast in the municipality of Cudillero, near the village of Riego de Abajo, in the parish of Oviñana (Spain).

It is one of the most important capes in Asturias, from which it is possible to see Estaca de Bares, another notable cape located to the west, and Cape Peñas, a prominent headland to the east. Geologically, it is formed from a combination of quartzite and slate, which have been shaped by millions of years of erosion from the relentless pounding of the Cantabrian sea: the result is a dramatic 80-meter cliff that rises abruptly from the sea. Among its main attractions are the lighthouse and the "iglesiona", a cave formed by wave erosion that can be visited at low tide. In terms of fauna, the cliff is an important breeding area for various seabirds, notably the European shag and gulls. Cape Vidio is easily accessible by car or public transportation from the nearby village of Riego de Abajo. Visitors can park at the designated car park and follow a short walking trail to the cape. The area is well-signposted, and there are several viewpoints and picnic areas along the way.

== Lighthouse ==
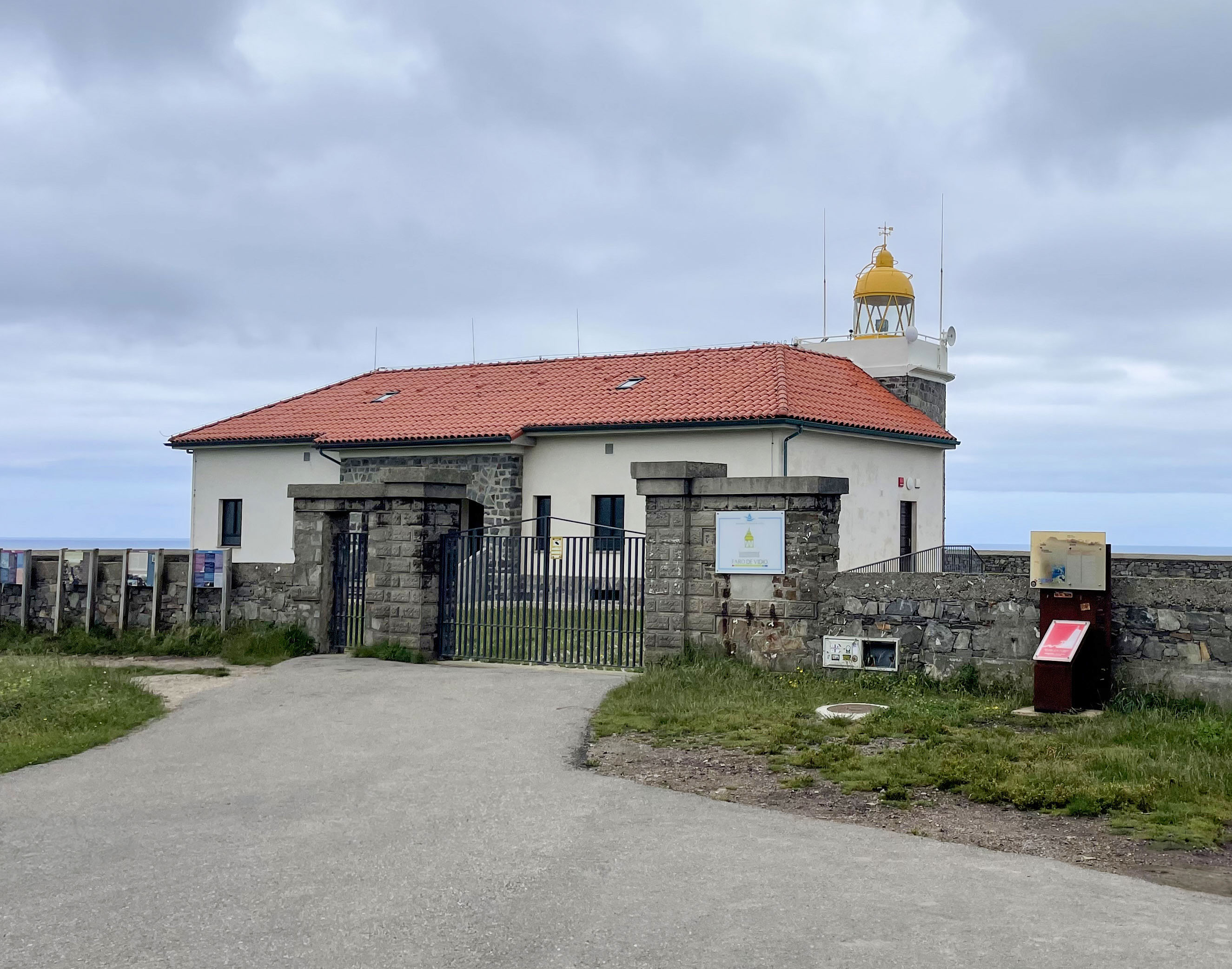
Cape Vidio lighthouse

The cape is also home to the last lighthouse built to date in Asturias and one of the newest in Spain, as it was constructed between 1948 and 1950. It is a complex consisting of the lighthouse and two dwellings that replaced the old warning signal. It is situated 89 meters above sea level. The lantern is located 76 meters above the average sea level and 10 meters in height with respect to the cape. The light signal emits 4 flashes every 20 seconds, with a range of 35.8 miles in good weather and 16 miles in fog. Today, it is automated and operated remotely by maritime signal technicians.

== Gallery ==
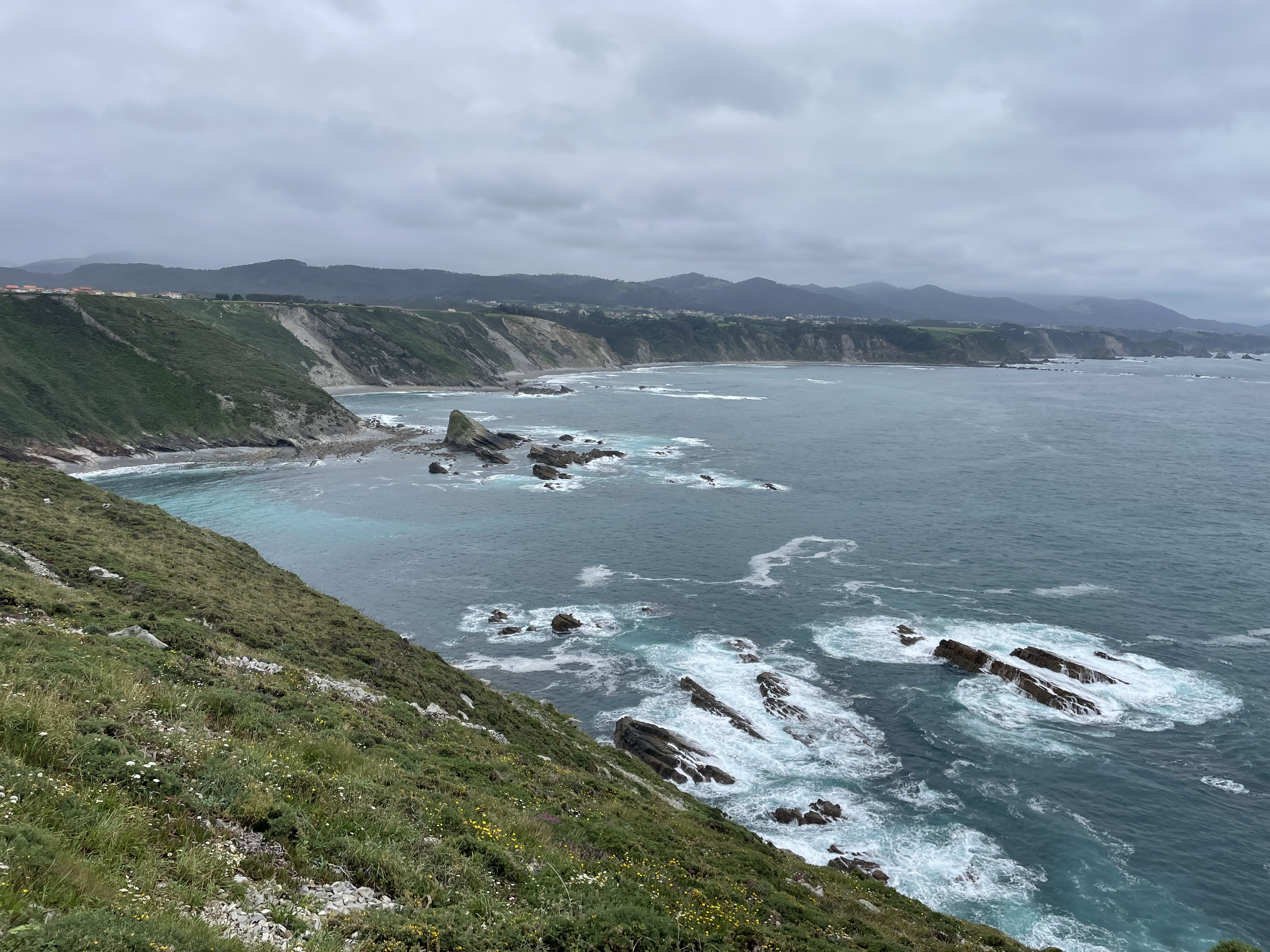
View from Cape Vidio westwards

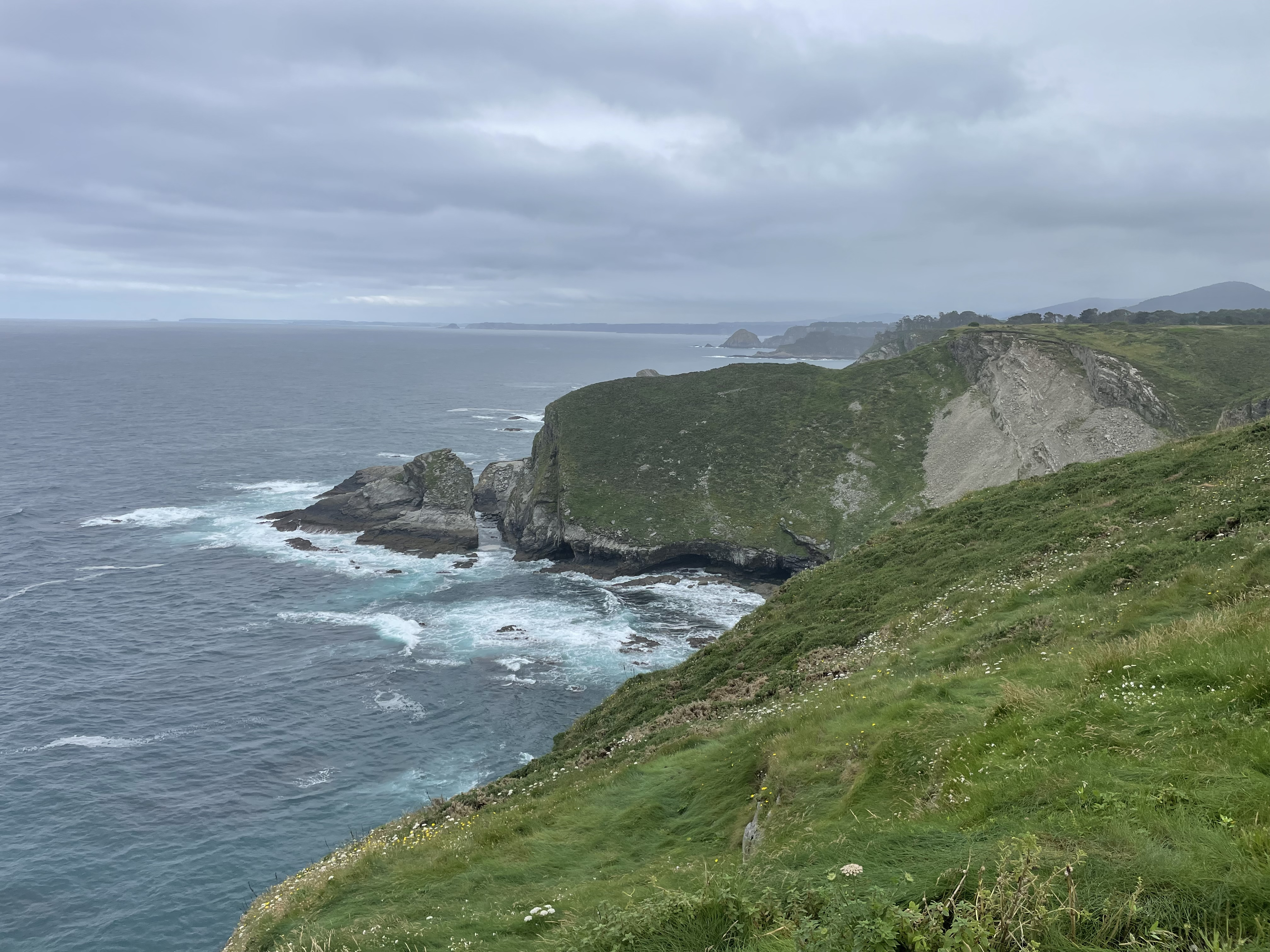
View from Cape Vidio eastwards
