= Martina Ibaibarriaga =

María Martina Ibaibarriaga Elorriaga
- Born: 26 January 1788; Berriz, Biscay, Spain
- Died: 6 June 1849 (aged 61); Oña, Burgos, Spain
- Occupation: Guerilla leader
- Known for: Legend

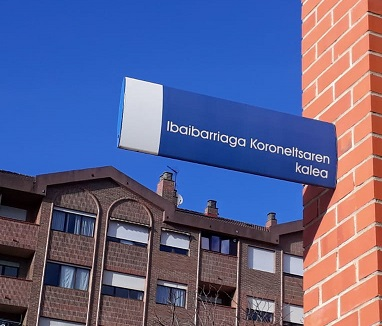

María Martina Ibaibarriaga Elorriaga (26 January 1788 – 6 June 1849) was a Spanish guerrilla leader during the Peninsular War (1807–14). A legend later grew up that she pretended to be a man, enlisted in the Spanish army, and rose to the rank of lieutenant colonel.

== Life ==
María Martina Ibaibarriaga Elorriaga was a native of Berriz, Biscay. She was born on 26 January 1788.

In 1810 Martina Ibaibarriaga's family was based in Durango, Biscay. The French arrested and interrogated them, and found that Martina, dressed as a man, had joined the band of the guerrilla Belard, "El manco". The next year Ibaibarriaga was in command of her own force of 50 men. The municipalities complained to the guerrilla leaders that her fighters were taking rations and supplies by force, without paying. As a result, the guerrillas of Francisco Espoz y Mina captured Ibaibarriaga in Munguía, Biscay, on 3 July 1811 and took her to a gathering of guerrilla chiefs at Villarcayo, Burgos. The leaders included Espoz y Mina, Francisco de Longa, Isidoro Salazar and Ignacio de Cuevillas. Eight of Ibaibarriaga's men were executed by firing squad, but she was spared.

Ibaibarriaga was allowed to serve under Longa for the remainder of the war. She joined the División de Iberia, Longa's guerrilla force. She met Lieutenant Félix Asenjo of Oña, Burgos early in 1812. He had been sent by the Spanish government to instruct new guerrillas. They married in March 1812. She participated in the battle of Vitoria on 21 June 1813. After the war Ibaibarriaga left the army. She and her husband went to live in Oña, where their son Francisco Asenjo Ibaibarriaga was born. A record of her post-war trial for banditry, at which she was acquitted, is held in the Historical Archives of Pamplona. Ferdinand VII of Spain gave her the honorary title of captain. In 1825 she was granted a state pension. She died in Oña on 6 June 1849.

In December 1977 a street in Vitoria was named after her. The street is wrongly named "Coronela Ibaibarriaga".

== Legend ==
Many of the misconceptions about Martina de Ibaibarriaga are due to her grandson, Ricardo Blanco Asenjo, who wrote a fictional story of his grandmother in the Madrid periodical El Imparcial dated 7 May 1883. It was said that her father and brother, who ran a pharmacy in Bilbao, were killed by the French in August 1808. This is almost certainly a later embellishment to her story. It is also untrue that she disguised herself as a man under the name of "Manuel Martinez" or that after reaching the rank of captain her sex was discovered at the siege of Zaragoza. It is known that she joined the guerrillas without hiding her sex, as did other women.

The legend says that Ibaibarriaga was commissioned in the Spanish army disguised as a man. She took the name of "Manuel Martínez". She is the only known example in the Peninsular War of a woman enlisting and serving as a man. She was seriously wounded during the Second Siege of Zaragoza in 1809 and her true identity was discovered. She fought in the battles of Gamarra, Barbastro and notably in the Battle of Vitoria (Gasteiz), when she came to the attention of General Wellington. She reached the rank of lieutenant colonel. After the war Ibaibarriaga married Lieutenant Félix Asenjo, and they had several children.

== Sources ==
- Cantos Casenave, Marieta; Durán López, Fernando; Romero Ferrer, Alberto (2006). La guerra de pluma: Sociedad, consumo y vida cotidiana (in Spanish). Servicio Publicaciones UCA. ISBN 978-84-9828-221-4.
- Egaña, Iñaki (2005). "Ibaibarriage, Martina". Quién es quién en la historia del país de los vascos (in Spanish). Txalaparta. ISBN 978-84-8136-399-9.
- Esdaile, Charles J. (7 August 2014). Women in the Peninsular War. University of Oklahoma Press. p. 114. ISBN 978-0-8061-4764-2.
- Estornés Lasa, Mariano (2013). "Martina Ibaibarriaga". Auñamendi Eusko Entziklopedia (in Spanish). Eusko Ikaskuntzaren Euskomedia Fundazioa. ISSN 2444-5487.
- Gaceta de Madrid (in Spanish). Imprenta Real. 1825.
- Sánchez Arreseigor, Juan José (2010). Vascos contra Napoleón. Madrid: Actas. ISBN 978-84-9739-099-6.
