= Rioseco Abbey =

Former Cistercian abbey in Spain

Coordinates: 42.8936°N 3.63333°W

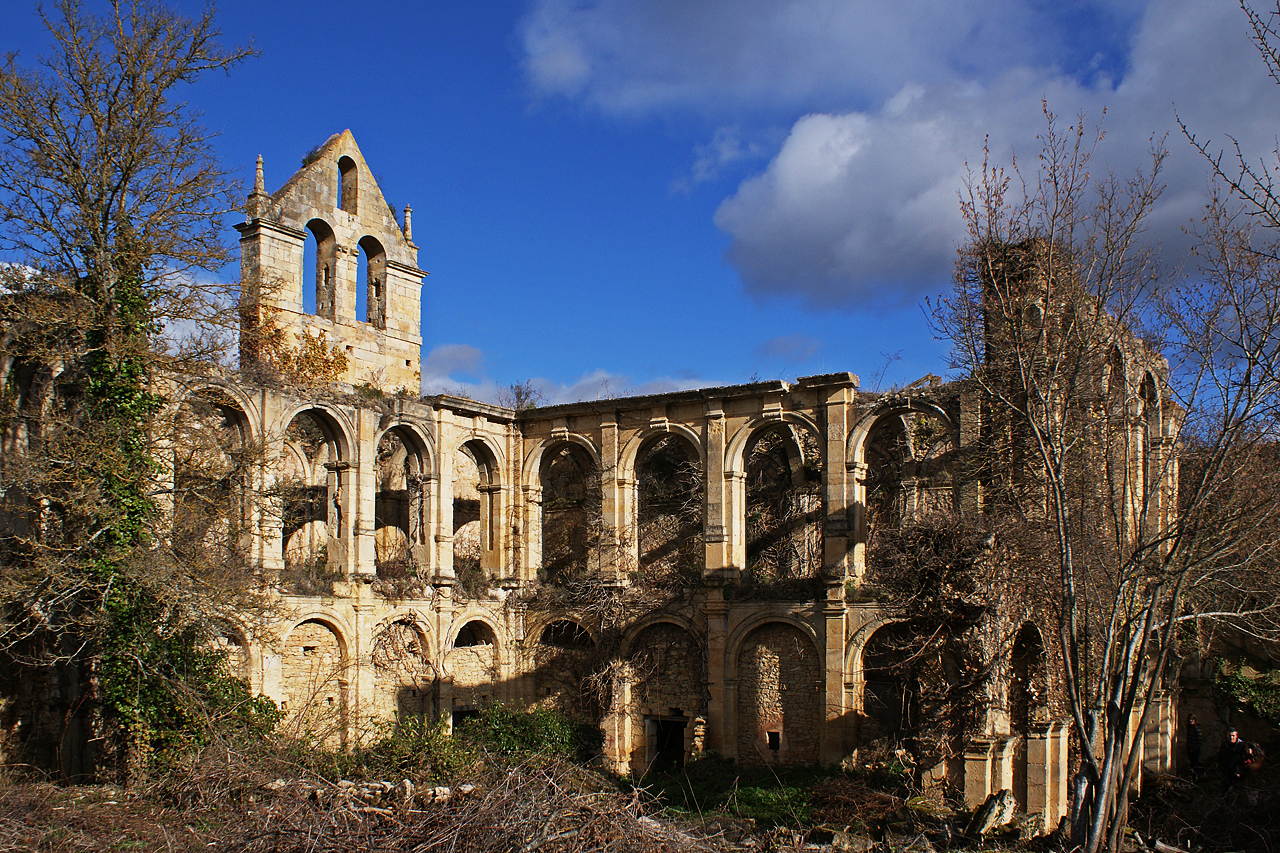
Abbey ruins 2010

Rioseco Abbey (Spanish: Monasterio cisterciense de Santa María de Rioseco) is a former Cistercian abbey situated in Rioseco in the Valle de Manzanedo, in the present province of Burgos, near the River Ebro.

== History ==
=== Origins ===
In 1148 the Cistercian Valbuena Abbey, of the filiation of Morimond, founded a daughter house in a small former hermitage in Quintanajuar, in the Páramo de Masa. In 1171 this new community received as a gift from the heirs of the nobleman Martino Martini de Uizozes the ancient monastery of Rioseco, the previous history of which is unrecorded. After a temporary relocation in the late 12th century to San Cipriano de Montes de Oca (La Rioja), the Cistercians moved to the Valle de Manzanedo at the beginning of the 13th century, and probably in 1204, to occupy the old monastery of Rioseco.

The site of the old monastery can still be seen by the ruins of the old conventual church. It seems that after a serious flood the new community had definitely established itself by 1236 at the latest on a new site a little to the north, on higher ground. After the move the former conventual church was put to use as the parish church of Nuestra Señora de Parrales.

=== Mid-term ===
By the 14th century Rioseco had become one of the most powerful economies among the Castilian Cistercians. From the middle of the 15th century however, in common in fact with most other monasteries, it experienced years of penury and crisis, before once again entering upon a period of further growth and prosperity in the 17th century.

=== Dissolution ===
During the Peninsular War, from 1808 to 1809 the French troops stationed in Medina de Pomar appropriated a large part of the monastery's stores and from 1809 until 29 June 1814 the monks were dispossessed. Nor after their return did they stay very long, for on 29 October 1820, during the Trienio Liberal, the commissars of the revolutionary government took possession of the monastery. At a public auction held in Villarcayo, most of the community's goods were sold. The monastery itself however found no buyer, and thereafter stood abandoned. The local populace continued to make some use of the premises as store-houses, parish church and cemetery.

In the 1850s the surviving buildings, especially the extremely well preserved church, still magnificently equipped and furnished, were deliberately and systematically stripped by the Arquiaga family of everything of any value that survived, and reduced to ruins.

== Description ==
The monastery is in the Herreriano style. An impressive spiral staircase is still preserved, the stone walls of the church still stand, and the bóvedas retain some traces of polychromy. The cartulary is now in the Archivo Histórico Nacional (codex 91B).

== Conservation ==
On account of its state of dereliction the monastery features in the Lista roja de patrimonio en peligro ("Red List of Imperilled Buildings"), to which it was added at the instance of the association Hispania Nostra in 2006.
