= Oña =

- Municipality
- Muy Leal y Valerosa Villa de Oña
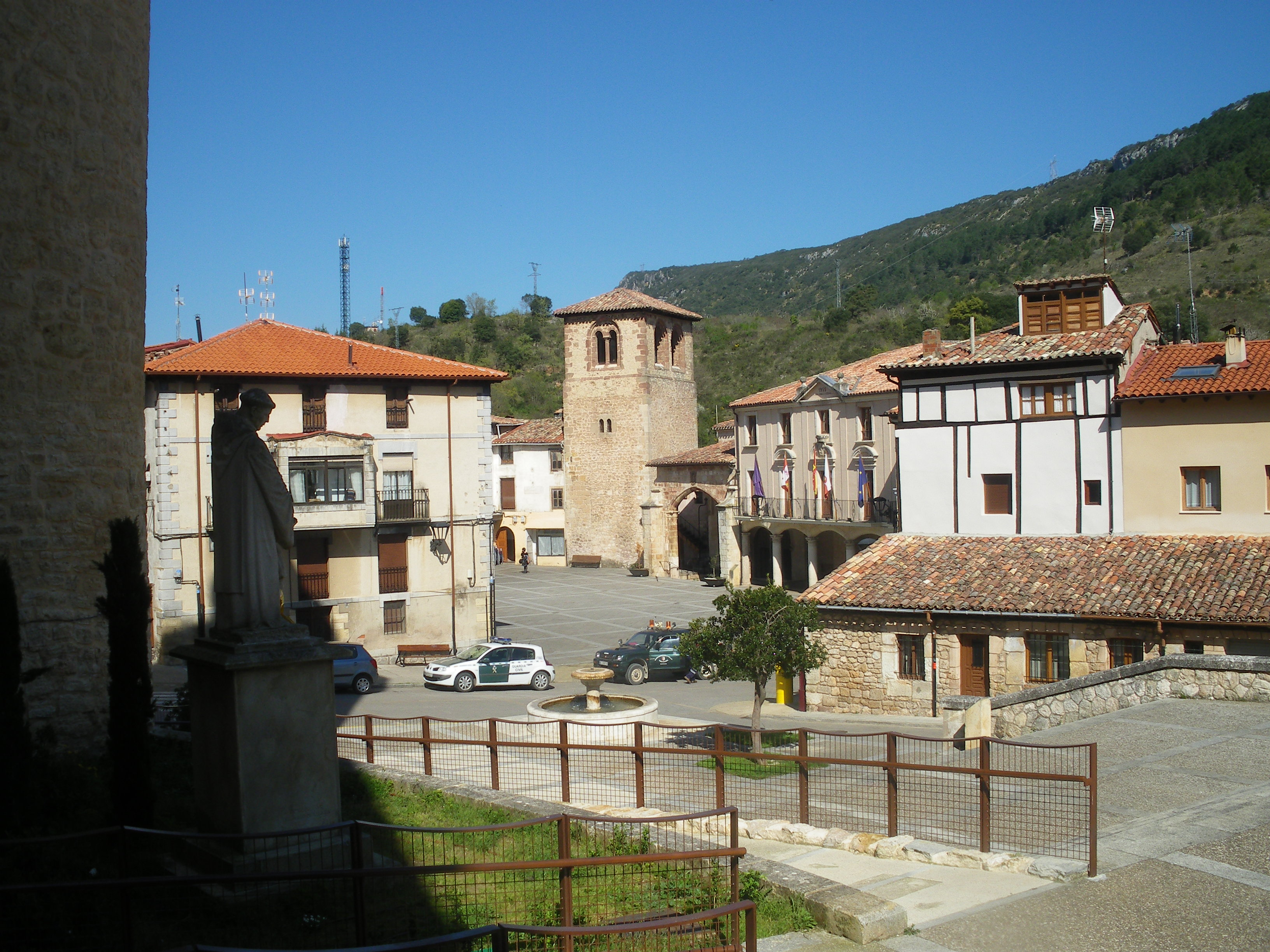
- The town of Oña

- Flag Coat of arms

- Location in Spain. Oña (Castile and León) Oña (Spain)
- Coordinates: 42°43′59″N 3°24′00″W
- Country: Spain
- Autonomous community: Castile and León
- Province: Burgos
- Comarca: La Bureba

Government
  - Alcalde: Arturo Luis Pérez López (PSOE)

Area
  - Total: 161.64 km^{2} (62.41 sq mi)
- Elevation: 598 m (1,962 ft)

Population (2025-01-01)
  - Total: 938
  - Density: 5.80/km^{2} (15.0/sq mi)
- Time zone: UTC+1 (CET)
  - Summer (DST): UTC+2 (CEST)
- Postal code: 09530
- Website: www.ayuntamientoona.com

Oña is a municipality and town located in the province of Burgos, Castile and León, Spain. According to the 2011 census (INE), the municipality has a population of 1,219 inhabitants.

== Main sights ==
- Benedictine monastery of San Salvador de Oña (11th century). During 2012, the town hosted the 17th edition of the sacred art exhibition Las Edades del Hombre.
- El jardín secreto, an outdoor walk and art exhibit by local artists.

== People from Oña ==
- Andrés de Olmos (1485 – 8 October 1571) – Catholic church priest and grammarian and ethno-historian of Mexico's Indians
- Martina Ibaibarriaga (1788–1849) – soldier
