= San Juan de Piñera =

- Parish
- Location within Spain
- Country: Spain
- Autonomous community: Asturias
- Province: Asturias
- Municipality: Cudillero

San Juan de Piñera is one of the nine parishes (administrative divisions) in the Cudillero municipality, within the province and autonomous community of Asturias, in northern Spain.

== Villages ==
- Arroxas
- Belandres
- La Cuesta'l Cestu
- El Mantu
- Outeiru
- El Penéu
- El Rellayu
- Villamar
- Los Villazones
- El Zreicéu
