= Piñera (Cudillero) =

- Parish
- Location within Spain
- Country: Spain
- Autonomous community: Asturias
- Province: Asturias
- Municipality: Cudillero

Piñera is one of nine parishes (administrative divisions) in the Cudillero municipality, within the province and autonomous community of Asturias, in northern Spain.

The population is 716 (INE 2007).

== Villages ==
- Armayor
- Arancés
- Bustiellu
- Pepín
- Piñera
- El Pitu
- La Vana
- Veiga
- Villazaín
