= Las Edades del Hombre =

Spanish religious and artistic foundation

Las Edades del Hombre is a religious foundation that was created to promote the sacred art of Castilla y León (Spain). The initiative was an idea of José Jiménez Lozano and José Velicia.

== Exhibitions ==
Since 1988 the foundation Las Edades del Hombre has organized a number of exhibitions, in Castile and León and abroad. In 2025 and 2026 the exhibition is in Zamora.

Edition	Original title (and translation)	Venue	Location	Dates
Series I
1	El arte en la Iglesia de Castilla y León (Art of the Catholic Church in Castile and Leon)	Cathedral of Our Lady of the Holy Assumption	Valladolid	1988–1989
2	Libros y documentos en la Iglesia de Castilla y León (Books and documents of the Catholic Church in Castile and León)	Cathedral of Saint Mary	Burgos	1990
3	La música en la Iglesia de Castilla y León (Music of the Catholic Church in Castile and León)	Cathedral of Saint Mary	León	1991–1992
4	El contrapunto y su morada (The counterpoint and its dwelling)	Old Cathedral of Saint Mary and New Cathedral of the Assumption of the Virgin	Salamanca	1993–1994
5	Flandes y Castilla y León (Flanders and Castile and León)	Cathedral of Our Lady	Antwerp (Belgium)	1995
6	La ciudad de seis pisos (The six-story town)	Cathedral of the Holy Assumption	El Burgo de Osma	1997
7	Memorias y esplendores (Memories and glories)	Cathedral of St. Antoninus	Palencia	1999
8	Encrucijadas (Crossroads)	Cathedral of Saint Mary	Astorga	2000
9	Remembranza (Remembrance)	Cathedral of the Holy Savior	Zamora	2001
10	Time to Hope (Note: Original title in English)	Cathedral of St. John the Divine	New York City (NY, USA)	2002
11	El Árbol de la Vida (The tree of life)	Cathedral of Our Lady of the Holy Assumption and St. Fructus	Segovia	2003
12	Testigos (Witnesses)	Cathedral of the Holy Savior	Ávila	2004
— (Note: Exhibition out of the respective series)	Inmaculada (Immaculate)	Cathedral of Saint Mary the Royal of la Almudena	Madrid	2005
13	Kyrios (Kyrios (Note: Kyrios is a Greek-origin biblical term for 'Lord'.))	Cathedral of Saint Mary	Ciudad Rodrigo	2006
14	Yo Camino (I trek)	Basilica of Our Lady of the Oak Tree and St. Andrew's Church	Ponferrada	May – November 2007
15	Paisaje interior (Inner landscape)	Co-Cathedral of St. Peter	Soria	May 2009 – January 2010
Series II
16	Passio (Passio (Note: Passio is a Latin liturgical term for the final period in the life of Jesus))	Church of St. James the Royal	Medina del Campo (Note: The 2011 exhibition was co-hosted by two towns)	2011
16	Passio (Passio)	Church of Saint James the Apostle of the Knights	Medina de Rioseco	2011
17	Monacatus (Monasticism (Note: Latin term))	Monastery of the Holy Savior	Oña	May – November 2012
18	Credo (Creed)	Church of Saint Mary Major, St. Martin's Church, Church of Christ the Savior, and Sexmos's House	Arévalo	May – November 2013
—	25th anniversary commemorative exhibition	Cathedral of Our Lady of the Holy Assumption	Valladolid	October – December 2013
19	Eucharistia (Eucharist)	Church of Saint Mary the Royal and St. John's Church	Aranda de Duero	2014
20	Teresa de Jesús. Maestra de Oración (Teresa of Ávila, mistress of prayer)	Convent of Our Lady of Grace, Mosén Rubí Chapel, and Church of St. John the Baptist	Ávila (Note: The 2015 exhibition was co-hosted by two towns)	2015
20	Teresa de Jesús. Maestra de Oración (Teresa of Ávila, mistress of prayer)	Basilica of Saint Teresa of Avila	Alba de Tormes	2015
21	Aqva (Water)	Collegiate church of Santa María la Mayor and Church of the Holy Sepulchre	Toro	2016
22	Reconciliare (Reconcile)	Church of San Andrés, Church of San Martín and Church of San Esteban	Cuéllar	2017
23	Mons Dei (Mountain of God)	Collegiate church of San Miguel and Church of Santa Cecilia	Aguilar de Campoo	2018
—	Contrapunto 2.0 (Counterpoint 2.0)	New Cathedral of the Assumption of the Virgin	Salamanca	2018-2019
24	Angeli (Angels)	Collegiate church of San Pedro, Hermitage of La Piedad and Church of the Ascension of the Lord	Lerma	2019
25	Lux (Light)	Cathedral of Saint Mary	Burgos	2021
25	Lux (Light)	Church of Santiago and Church of Santa María del Camino	Carrión de los Condes	2021
25	Lux (Light)	Church of San Tirso and Sanctuary of the Pilgrim	Sahagún	2021
26	Transitus (Passage)	Cathedral of Saint Mary	Plasencia	2022
27	Hospitalitas (Hospitality)	Church of St. James the Apostle and Collegiate Church of St. Mary	Villafranca del Bierzo	2024
27	Hospitalitas (Hospitality)	Santiago de Compostela Cathedral and Monastery of San Martiño Pinario	Santiago de Compostela	2024
28	Esperanza (Hope)	Church of San Cipriano and Cathedral of the Holy Savior	Zamora	2025-2026
