= Piñera family =

The Piñera family is a Chilean family which gained political influence in the late 20th century.

== Prominent members ==
- Sebastián Piñera, President of Chile (2010–2014, 2018–2022)
- José Piñera, economist, brother of Sebastián
- Miguel Piñera, musician, brother of Sebastián
- Pablo Piñera, brother of Sebastián
- Bernardino Piñera, Catholic bishop, uncle of Sebastián
- Andrés Chadwick, senator, cousin of Sebastián
- Herman Chadwick, brother of Andrés
- María Teresa Chadwick, sister of Andrés
- Cecilia Morel, First Lady (2010–2014, 2018–2022), wife of Sebastián
- José Antonio Viera-Gallo, Socialist politician, husband of María Teresa

Ancestors of Piñera family

16. José Piñera y Lombera
8. Bernardino Piñera Aguirre
17. Mercedes Aguirre Carvallo
4. José Manuel Piñera Figueroa
18. Jose Manuel Figueroa Vela
9. María Luisa Figueroa Vial
19. Pilar Vial Formas
2. José Piñera Carvallo
20. Francisco Carvallo Gómez
10. Uldaricio Carvallo Fernández
21. Mercedes Fernández Carvallo
5. Elena Carvallo Castillo
22. Angel Castillo Pareja
11. Julia Castillo Goñi
23. Monica Goñi Prieto
1. Sebastián Piñera Echenique
24. José Francisco Echenique Tagle
12. José Miguel Echenique Gandarillas
25. Irene Gandarillas Valdés
6. José Miguel Echenique Correa
26. Bonifacio Correa Albano
13. Mercedes Correa Errázuriz
27. Mercedes Errázuriz Valdivieso
3. Magdalena Echenique Rozas
28. Carlos Rozas Urrutia
14. Nicanor Rozas Rozas
29. Manuela Rozas García
7. Josefina Rozas Ariztía
30. Ricardo Ariztia Urmeneta
15. Josefa Ariztía Pinto
31. Luisa Pinto Garmendia
