= Monastery of Bonaval =

- Monasterio de Bonaval (Spanish)
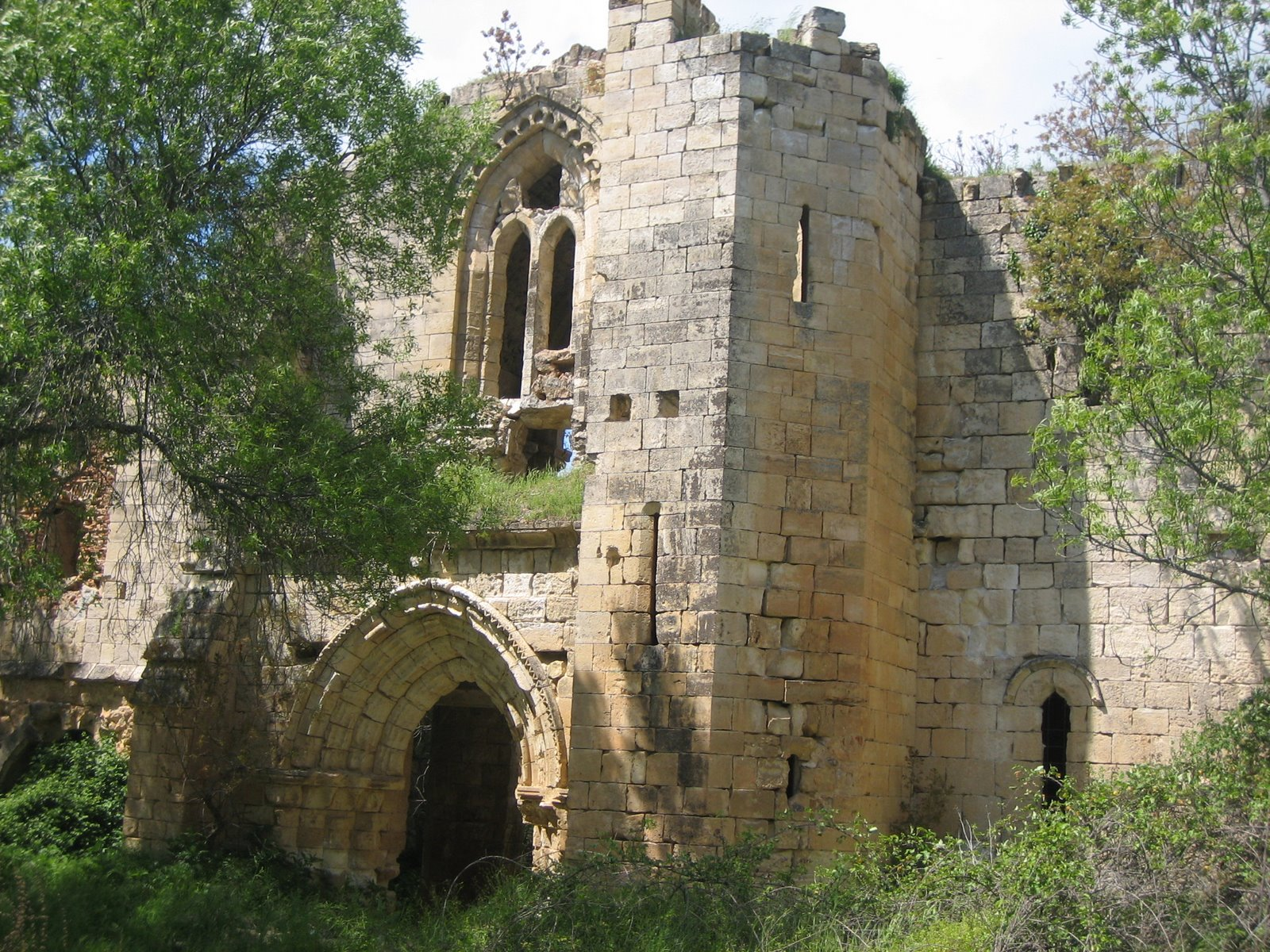

- Location within Spain
- 40.968272°N 3.293889°W
- Location: Retiendas, Spain

Spanish Cultural Heritage
- Official name: Monasterio de Bonaval
- Type: Non-movable
- Criteria: Monument
- Designated: 1992
- Reference no.: RI-51-0007285

The Monastery of Bonaval (Spanish: Monasterio de Bonaval) is a monastery located in Retiendas, Spain. It was declared Bien de Interés Cultural in 1992.

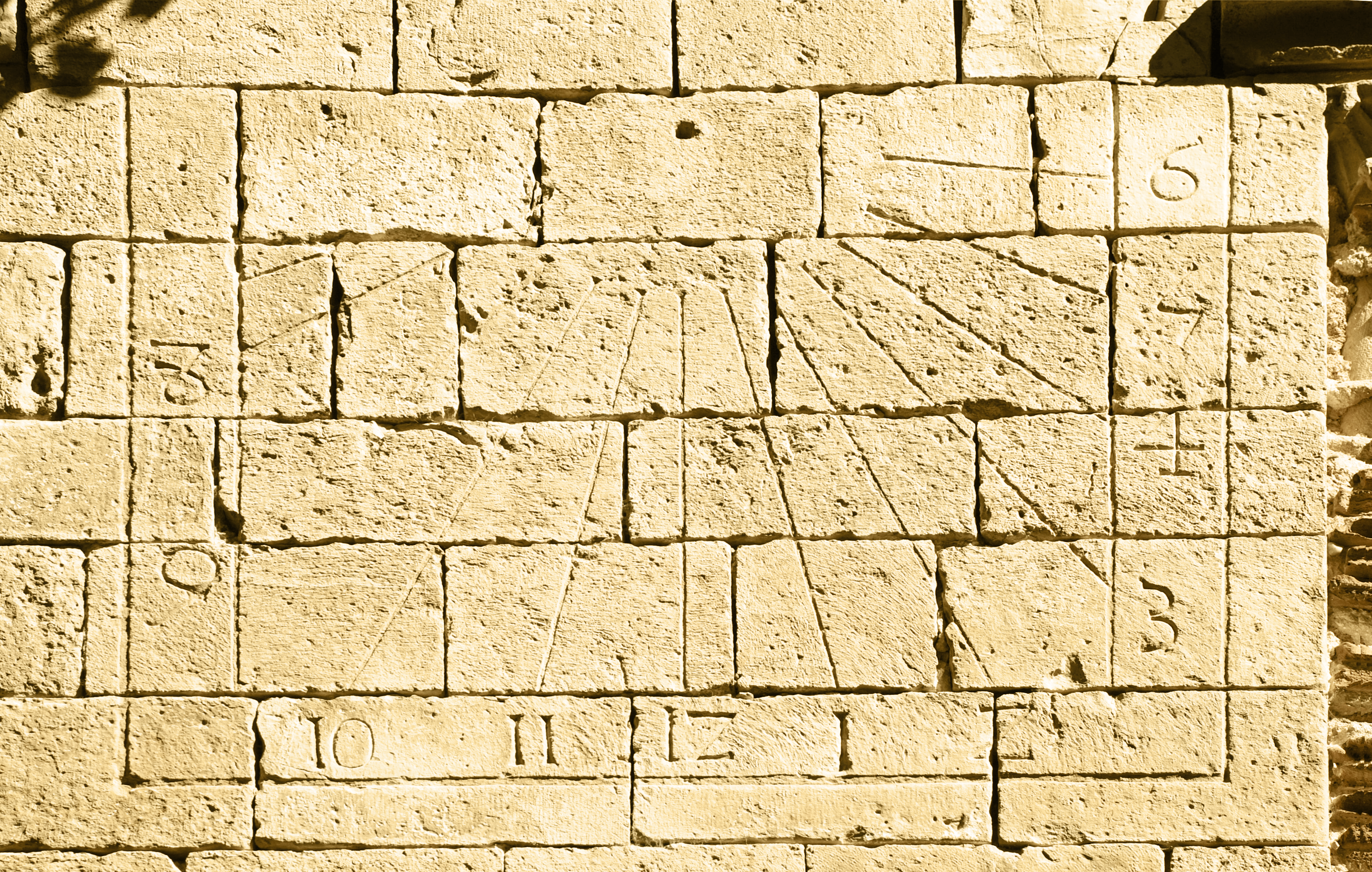
The sundial at Bonaval
