= José Jiménez Lozano =

Spanish writer (1930–2020)

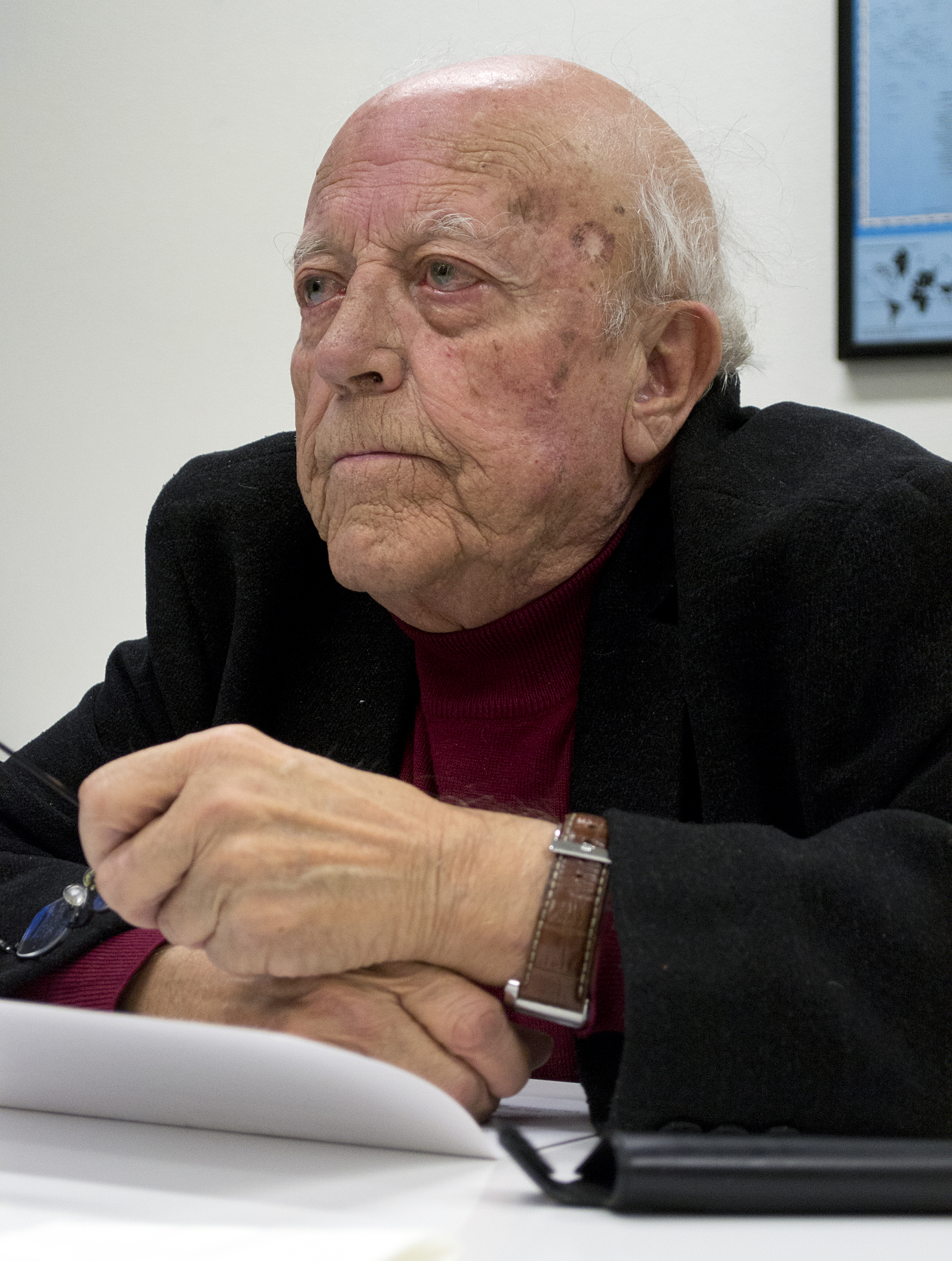
José Jiménez Lozano

José Jiménez Lozano (13 May 1930 – 9 March 2020) was a Spanish writer. In 2002 he was awarded the Miguel de Cervantes Prize.

== Biography ==
Jiménez Lozano was born in Langa, a village in the province of Ávila. After finishing his studies in 1962, he became a journalist and writer, winning the Cervantes Prize in 2002. Not well known to the general public, he emphasized religious and social themes in both his journalism and his novels.

== Works ==
- Historia de un otoño (novel) (1971)
- El sambenito (novel) (1972)
- La salamandra (novel) (1973)
- El santo de mayo (novel) (1976)
- Guía espiritual de Castilla (essays) (1984)
- Avila (essays) (1988)
- El grano de maíz rojo (novel) (1988)
- El empleo (novel) (1989)
- El mudejarillo (novel) (1992)
- Tantas devastaciones (poems) (1992)
- La boda de Ángela (novel) (1993)
- Teorema de Pitágoras (novel) (1995)
- Un fulgor tan breve (poems) (1995)
- Las sandalias de plata (novel) (1996)
- El tiempo de Eurídice (poems) (1996)
- Los compañeros (novel) (1997)

== Adaptations ==
- Tom Ojos Azules is the basis of a children's opera (2016) of the same name by American composer John Craton, with libretto by José Jiménez Lozano.
