= Miguel Piñera =

Chilean nightclub owner (1954–2025)

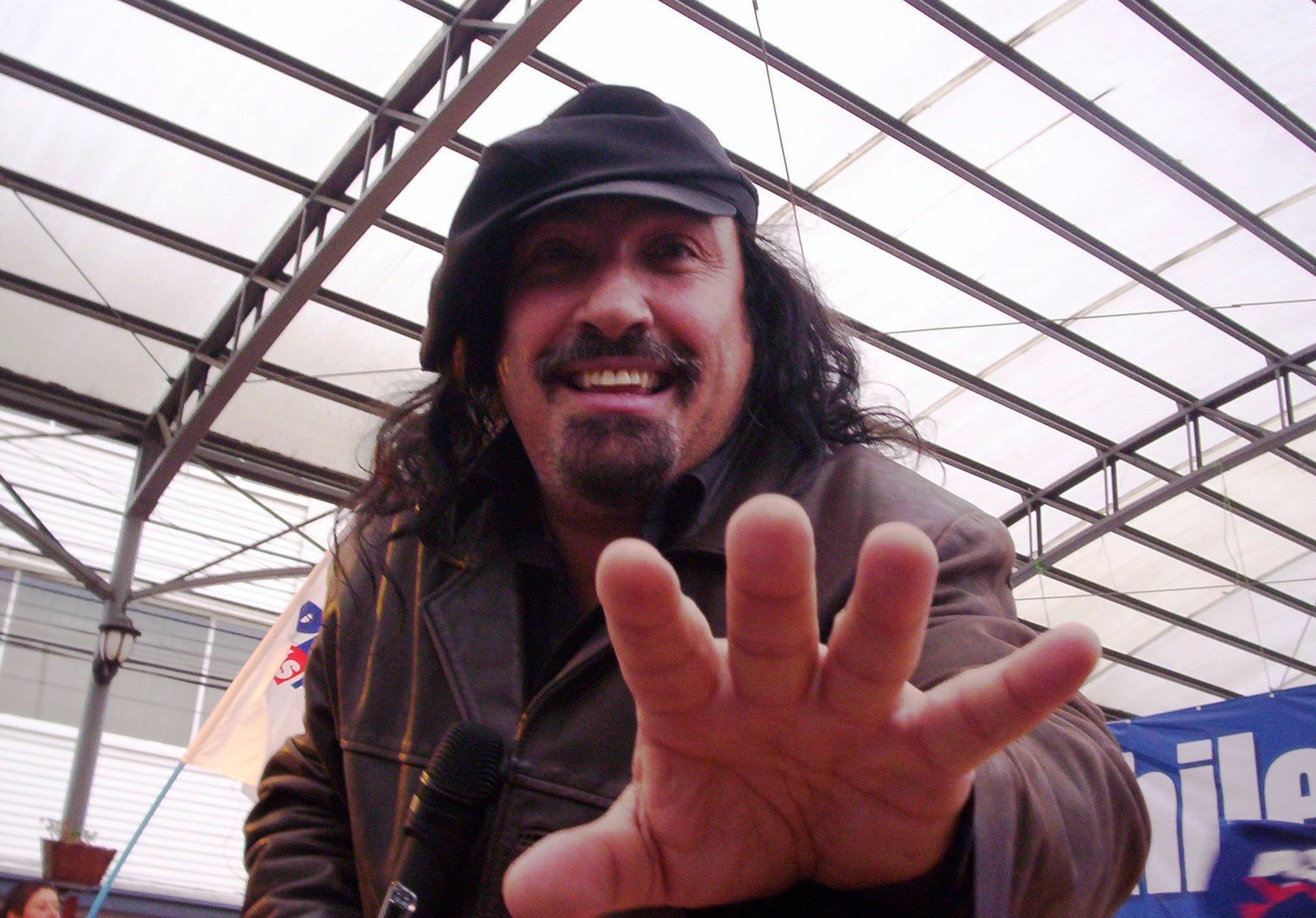
- Piñera in 2006
- Born: José Miguel Carlos Piñera Echenique; 18 October 1954; Santiago, Chile
- Died: 28 February 2025 (age 70); Temuco, Chile
- Occupations: celebrity, night club owner and amateur musician.

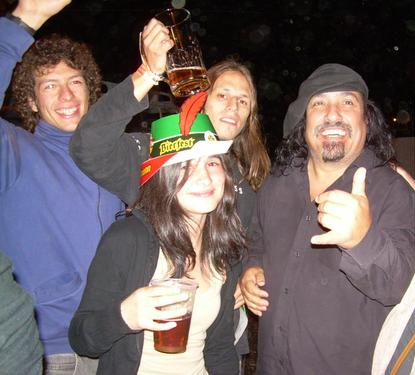
Piñera in Bierfest Valdivia in 2007

José Miguel Carlos "Negro" Piñera Echenique (18 October 1954 – 28 February 2025) was a Chilean celebrity, night club owner and amateur musician who was the youngest brother of former Chilean President Sebastián Piñera and of economist José Piñera. He married Argentinian model Belén Hidalgo in 2004 but divorced in 2011. Negro Piñera was of Asturian and Basque descent.

Miguel Piñera was the fifth son of José Piñera Carvallo and Magdalena Echenique Rozas. His siblings were Guadalupe, José, Sebastián, Pablo, and María Teresa.

He studied at the Colegio del Verbo Divino, and Saint George's School. During his adolescence, he lived in Belgium through his father's role as the Chilean ambassador to Belgium and the United Nations. His father's profession would also later take him to live in New York City.

At the age of fifteen, he received his first electric guitar and developed his musical talent. He participated in South America's largest music festival, Festival de la Canción de Viña del Mar, in 1983.

Piñera was a well-known celebrity in the Chilean show and nightclub business. He died from multiple organ failure on 28 February 2025, at the age of 70.
