= Sergio Romero (disambiguation) =

Sergio Romero (born 1987) is an Argentine football goalkeeper.

Sergio Romero may also refer to:

- Sergio Romero Pizarro (born 1938), Chilean politician
- Sergio Romero (Colombian footballer) (born 1988), Colombian football forward
