= Baseball arbitration =

Baseball arbitration can refer to:

- Pendulum arbitration
- Salary arbitration during free agency (Major League Baseball) in the United States
