= Rudecindo =

Rudecindo is a Spanish given name. Notable people with the name include:

- Rudecindo Alvarado (1792–1872), Argentine general
- Rudecindo Ortega Mason (1899–1962), Chilean politician
