= Permanent Representative of Chile to the United Nations =

Ambassador and Permanent Representative of Chile to the United Nations

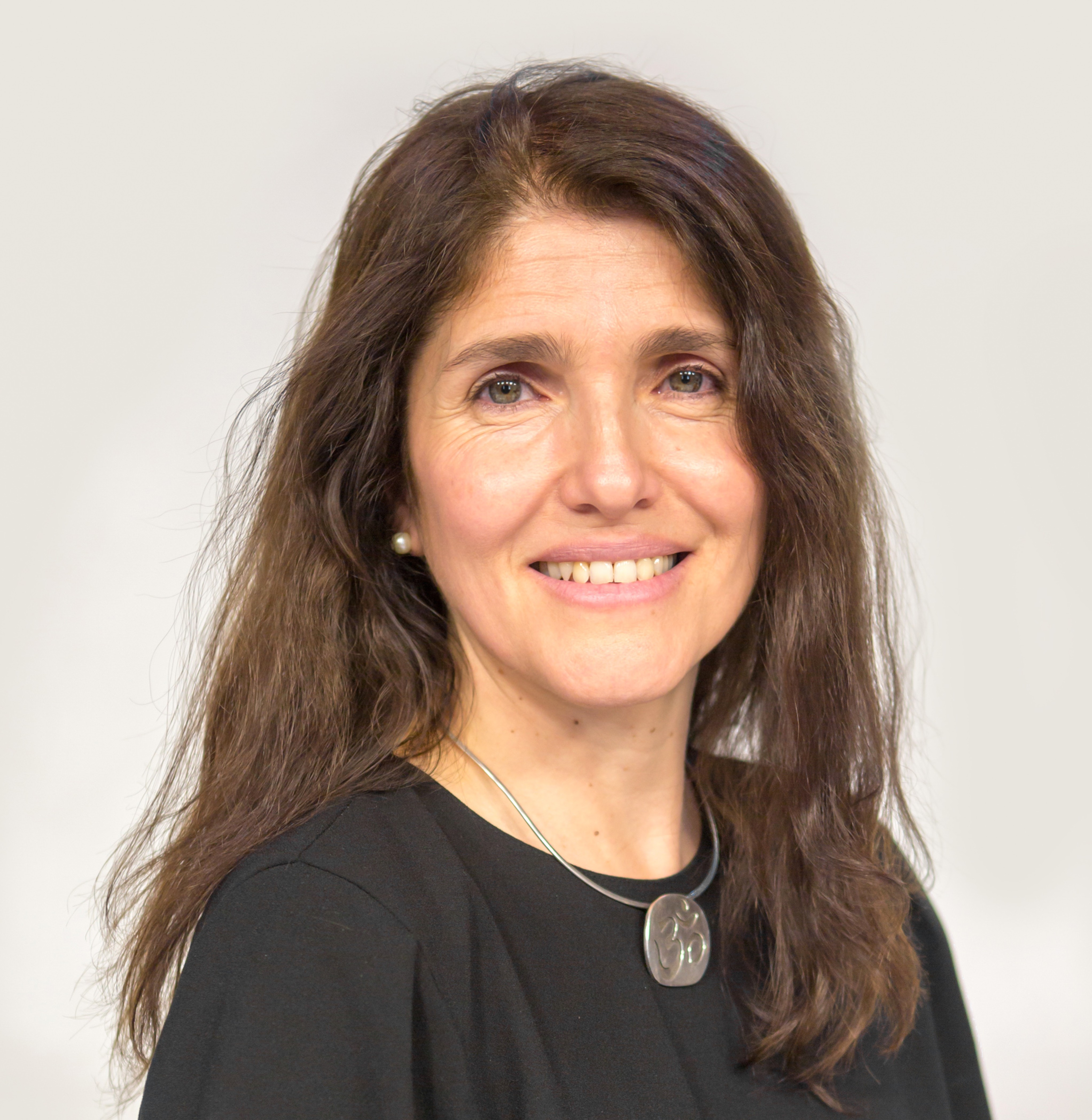
- Incumbent; Paula Narváez since 8 June 2022
- Style: His Excellency
- Appointer: Gabriel Boric
- Inaugural holder: Hernán Santa Cruz
- Formation: 1946
- Website: Permanent Mission (in Spanish)

The role of the ambassador and permanent representative of Chile to the United Nations is as the leader of the Chilean delegation to the United Nations in New York and as head of the Permanent Mission of Chile to the UN. The position has the rank and status of an ambassador extraordinary and plenipotentiary and is also the representative of Chile in the United Nations Security Council (2014–2015).

The permanent representative, currently Paula Narváez, is charged with representing Chile during plenary meetings of the General Assembly, except in the rare situation in which a more senior officer (such as the minister for foreign affairs or the president) is present.

== Office holders ==
Incumbent	Start of term	End of term
Gabriel González Videla (Head of Delegation)	1945	1946
Hernán Santa Cruz	1946	1953
Rudecindo Ortega Mason	1953	1956
Roberto Aldunate León	1956	1960
Daniel Schweitzer	1960	1966
José Piñera Carvallo	1966	1970
Humberto Diaz Casanueva	1970	1973
Ismael Huerta	1974	1977
Sergio Diez	1977	1982
Manuel Trucco Gaete	1982	1984
Pedro Daza	1984	1990
Juan Somavia	1990	1999
Juan Gabriel Valdés	2000	2003
Heraldo Muñoz	2003	2010
Octavio Errázuriz	2010	2014
Cristian Barros	2014	2018
Milenko Skoknic Tapia	2018	2022
Paula Narváez	2022	present

== See also ==
- Chile and the United Nations
- Foreign relations of Chile
