= Sergio Diez =

Chilean politician (1925–2015)

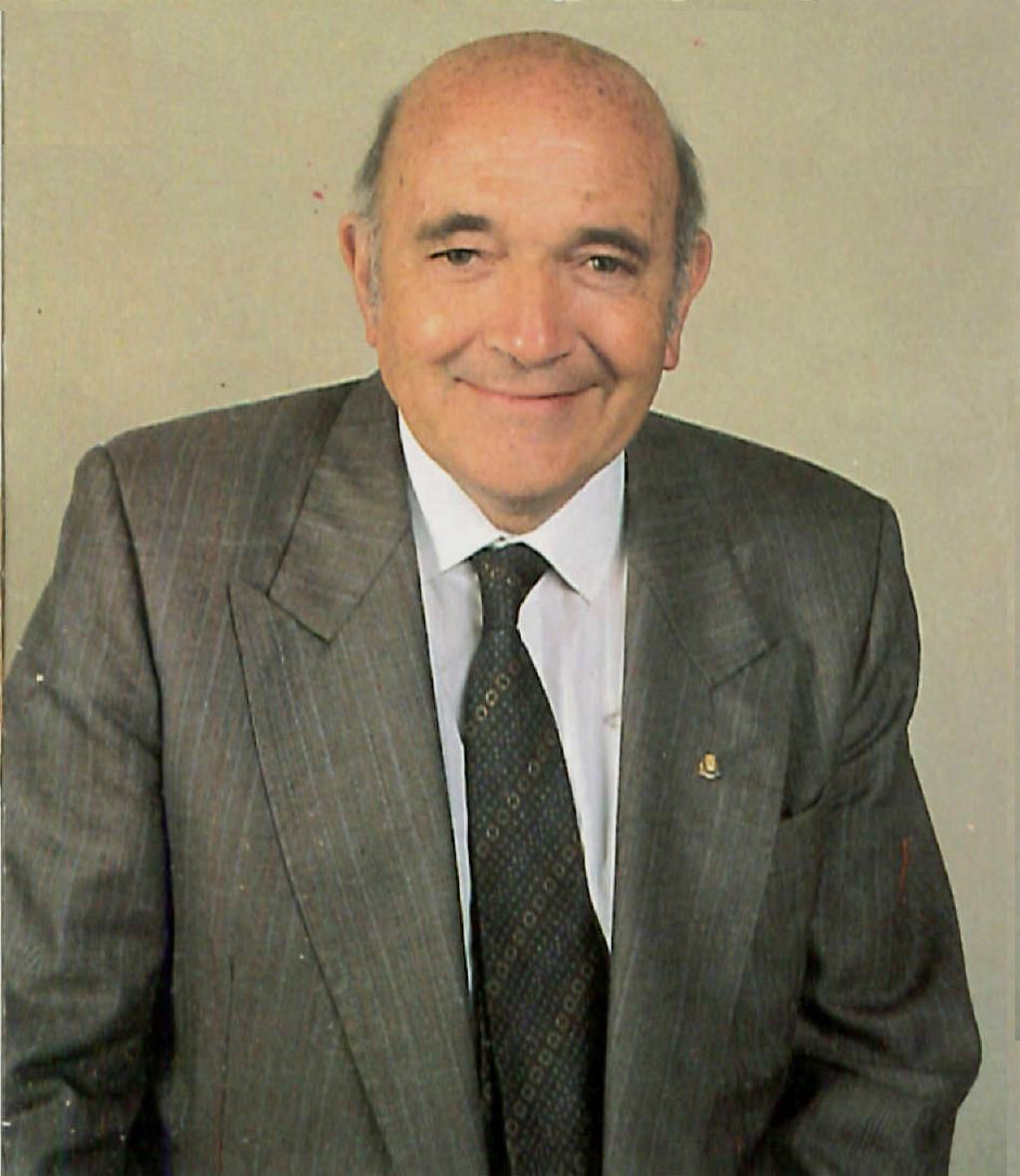
- Diez at 1990

President of the Senate of Chile
- In office 11 March 1996 – 12 March 1997
- Preceded by: Gabriel Valdés Subercaseaux
- Succeeded by: Sergio Romero Pizarro

Member of the Senate
- In office 11 March 1990 – 11 March 2002
- Preceded by: District created
- Succeeded by: José García Ruminot
- Constituency: 15th Circunscription (Southern Araucanía)
- In office 15 May 1973 – 11 September 1973
- Preceded by: José Foncea
- Succeeded by: 1973 Coup d'état
- Constituency: 6th Circunscription (Curicó, Talca, Maule and Linares)

Ambassador of Chile to the United Nations
- In office 1977–1982
- Preceded by: Ismael Huerta
- Succeeded by: Manuel Trucco Gaete

Member of the Chamber of Deputies
- In office 25 October 1971 – 15 May 1973
- Preceded by: Carlos Avendaño Ortúzar
- Succeeded by: Alejandro Bell Jara
- Constituency: 14th Departamental Grouping
- In office 15 May 1957 – 15 May 1965
- Preceded by: Fernando Hurtado Echenique
- Succeeded by: Rodolfo Werner
- Constituency: 12th Departamental Grouping

Personal details
- Born: 2 April 1925 Curicó, Chile
- Died: 2 April 2015 (aged 89) Santiago, Chile
- Party: Conservative Party (1935–1949); Traditionalist Conservative Party (1949–1953); United Conservative Party (1953–1966); National Party (1966–1973); Renovación Nacional (1987–2015)
- Spouse: Ana María Arriagada
- Children: Six
- Education: Pontifical Catholic University of Chile (LL.B)
- Occupation: Politician
- Profession: Lawyer

Sergio Eduardo Diez Urzúa (2 April 1925 – 29 June 2015) was a Chilean architect and politician who served as a parliamentarian and ambassador.

In 1948, he was general secretary of the Conservative Party and then a member of its executive board. Between 1950 and 1955 he was a professor of Roman law and civil law.

In 1957 he was a deputy for Talca. In 1961 he was re-elected as a deputy for the 1961-1965 legislative period.

Speaking before the United Nations General Assembly's Third Committee in 1975, he denied the Pinochet regime had any role in human rights violations; in 2004, he admitted he had been deceived by the state. He also served as Chile's permanent representative to the United Nations in New York from 1977 to 1982.

He was part of the Ortúzar Commission that helped draft the 1980 Constitution.

== Biography ==
=== Family and youth ===
He was born in Curicó on 2 April 1925. He was the son of Manuel Diez García and Yolanda Urzúa Ravanal. He married Ana María Arriagada Moreno, and they had six children.

=== Education and professional career ===
He completed his secondary education at the Instituto San Martín of Curicó, run by the Marist Brothers. He later entered the Faculty of Law of the Pontifical Catholic University of Chile, where he qualified as a lawyer on 15 July 1948. His degree thesis was entitled Some considerations on public order in Chilean civil law.

During his university years, he served as a teaching assistant in Roman Law. In 1950, he became full professor of Roman Law; in 1955, full professor of Civil Law; and in 1963, full professor of Constitutional Law and Political Theory at the same university. He also served as president of the Law Students’ Association in 1946.

After his parliamentary career and following the events of 1973, he practiced law privately and served as director of several commercial companies in Santiago, while continuing his activities as an agricultural entrepreneur.

== Political career ==
He entered political life at the age of eighteen, joining the Conservative Party. After graduating as a lawyer in 1948, he became Secretary General of the Conservative Youth and later a member of the party's executive board. Between 1952 and 1953, he served as president of the Conservative Youth, and from 1962 to 1963, he was president of the Conservative Party. In 1966, he joined the National Party (Chile), and in March 1990 he became a member of National Renewal.

He was elected deputy in 1957 for the 12th Departmental District (Talca, Lontué and Curepto), serving until 1961. He was re-elected for the same district for the 1961–1965 term and later elected deputy in a by-election in March 1972 for the 14th Departmental District (Linares, Loncomilla and Parral), replacing Carlos Santiago Avendaño Ortúzar. He served in several standing committees, including Constitution, Justice, Finance, Mining, Labour and Social Security.

In 1973, he was elected senator representing the National Party for the 6th Provincial District (Curicó, Talca, Linares and Maule) for the 1973–1981 term. His mandate was terminated prematurely following the dissolution of Congress after the military coup of 11 September 1973. During this period, he served as head of his party's parliamentary caucus in the Senate.

During the military government of General Augusto Pinochet Ugarte, he served as Chile's Permanent Representative to the United Nations and as a delegate to the Organization of American States. In 1980, he joined the Commission for the Study of the Constitution of 1980, and in 1982 he served as vice president of Fundación Chile.

Following the transition to democracy, he was elected senator as an independent candidate within the Democracy and Progress Pact for the 15th Senatorial District (Southern Araucanía Region) for the 1990–1994 term, later joining National Renewal. He was re-elected senator in December 1993 for the 1994–2002 term. During this period, he served as President of the Senate from 12 March 1996 to 12 March 1997 and chaired the Standing Committee on Constitution, Legislation, Justice and Regulations, also participating in committees on Education, Culture and Internal Affairs.

He was widely recognized by his peers for his influence on major legislative reforms, including constitutional amendments, criminal procedure reform, and key budgetary and tax debates. He also published articles and monographs, particularly in the field of constitutional law.

=== Death ===
He died in Santiago on 29 June 2015.
