= Clodomiro Almeyda =

Chilean politician (1923–1997)

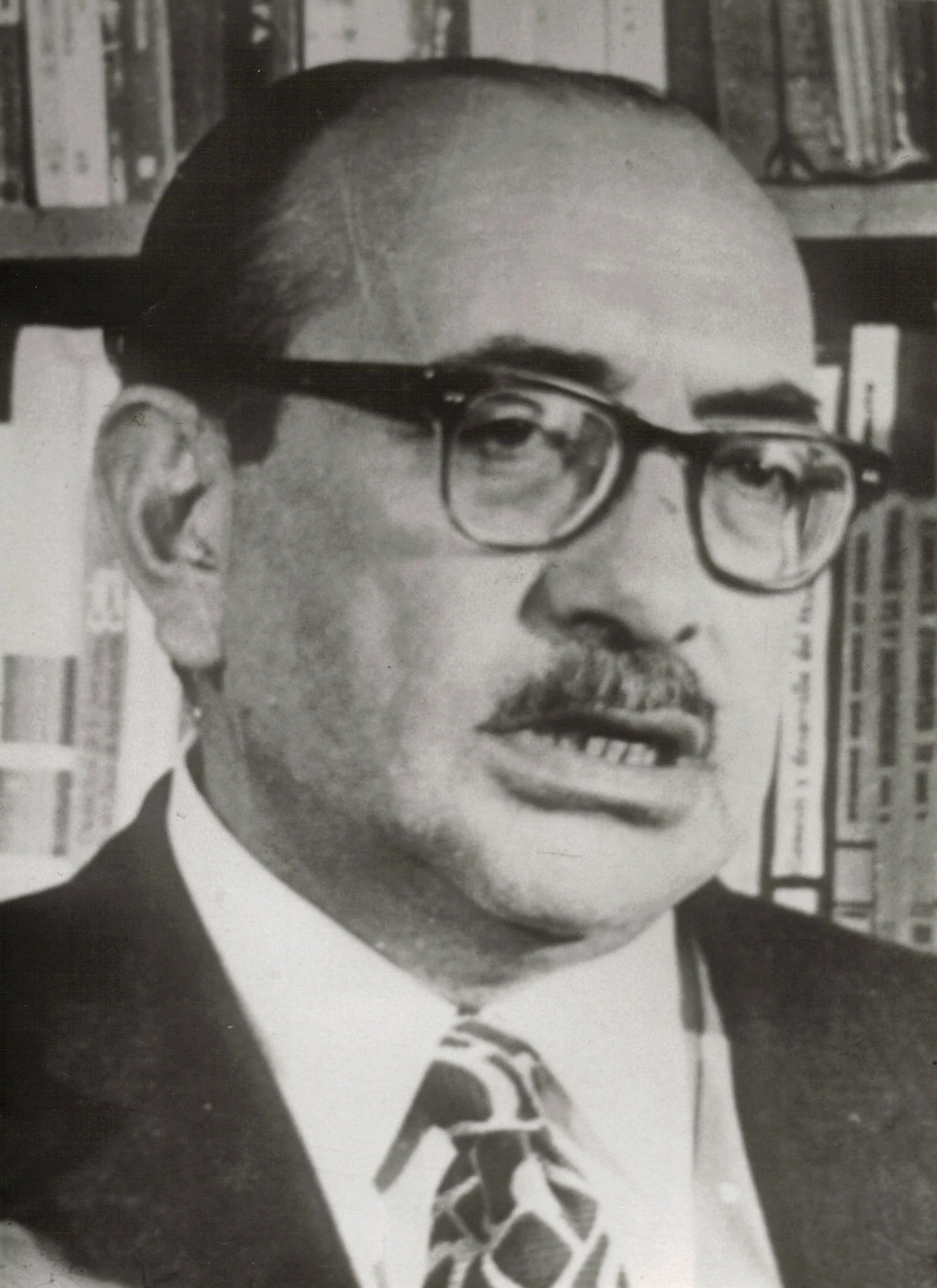

Minister of Foreign Affairs of Chile
- In office 9 August 1973 – 11 September 1973
- President: Salvador Allende
- Preceded by: Orlando Letelier
- Succeeded by: Ismael Huerta
- In office 3 November 1970 – 22 May 1973
- President: Salvador Allende
- Preceded by: Gabriel Valdés
- Succeeded by: Orlando Letelier

Minister of National Defense of Chile
- In office 5 July 1973 – 9 August 1973
- President: Salvador Allende
- Preceded by: José Tohá
- Succeeded by: Carlos Prats

Minister of Mining of Chile
- In office 25 June 1953 – 14 October 1953
- President: Carlos Ibáñez del Campo
- Preceded by: Rafael Tarud
- Succeeded by: Francisco Cuevas Mackenna

Minister of Labor of Chile
- In office 3 November 1952 – 10 March 1953
- President: Carlos Ibáñez del Campo
- Preceded by: Juan Atala
- Succeeded by: Leandro Moreno Garrido

Personal details
- Born: José Clodomiro Almeyda Medina; 11 February 1923 Santiago, Chile
- Died: 25 August 1997 (aged 74) Santiago, Chile
- Resting place: Santiago General Cemetery
- Party: Socialist Party of Chile
- Education: University of Chile

José Clodomiro Almeyda Medina (February 11, 1923 – August 25, 1997) was a Chilean lawyer, professor and politician. A leading member of the Socialist Party of Chile, he served as Minister of Foreign Affairs from 1970 to 1973 during the presidency of Salvador Allende.

== Biography ==
=== Early life ===
Almeyda was born in Santiago. After studying at the German High School and Application High School of Santiago, he enrolled at the Faculty of Law of the University of Chile. He graduated in 1948 with a thesis entitled Hacia una teoría marxista del Estado ("Towards a Marxist Theory of the State"). He later worked as a professor of political science at the Department of Sociology at the university.

=== Political career ===
He joined the Socialist Party of Chile in 1941, and participated in the Popular Socialist Party during the internal rifts in the first part of the 1950s. During the second government of Carlos Ibáñez del Campo he was Minister of Labor and Mining, standing out in his first ministry for being a promoter for the Workers' United Center of Chile (CUT). Almeyda resigned from his ministerial roles in 1953, due to conflicts between his party and Ibáñez del Campo. With the reunification of the Socialist Party in 1957, he rejoined the organization and was a member of the Chamber of Deputies between 1961 and 1965. From 1966, he served as director of the School of Sociology of the University of Chile.

With the victory of Salvador Allende in the 1970 Chilean presidential election, Almeyda was appointed to the post of Minister of Foreign Affairs. He remained in office during almost the entire Popular Unity government, except for a period from May 1973, when he left office after being elected a member of the Political Commission of the Socialist Party; he was appointed Minister of National Defense in July, but held the position for only one month before he was again appointed Minister of Foreign Affairs.

=== Coup d'état ===
After the coup d'état of September 11, 1973, which overthrew the constitutional government, Almeyda was arrested and transferred along with 99 other Popular Unity leaders and activists to Dawson Island concentration camp, where he was tortured and held under arrest for a long time. He eventually went into exile in Romania, the German Democratic Republic and Mexico, where he worked as a university teacher and a leader of the exiled opposition to the military dictatorship of General Augusto Pinochet. In 1979, he was elected secretary-general of the Socialist Party in exile.

=== Return to Chile ===
In a daring maneuver, he clandestinely returned to Chile in March 1987, crossing the Andes on the back of a mule, and later appearing publicly to the surprise of the authorities of the Pinochet regime. This led to him being the only person declared unconstitutional by the Constitutional Court of Chile, in use of the now defunct article 8 of the Constitution of Chile; the article outlawed political parties and individuals that propagated leftist political ideology (ideologies that promoted a doctrine "founded on class struggle"). The Constitutional Court ordered the removal of Almeyda's civil and political rights for ten years, and he would only be rehabilitated as a citizen after the end of the military dictatorship and Chile's transition to democracy. In addition to his loss of rights, Almeyda was internally exiled to the town of Chile Chico in Patagonia.

=== Post-dictatorship ===
In the years after Chile's democratic transition, Almeyda led the leftist faction of the Socialist Party, in opposition to the centrist wing led by Ricardo Núñez Muñoz. In this role, Almeyda tried to establish contacts with the Communist Party of Chile and other far-left parties, through formations such as Izquierda Unida and the short-lived Broad Party of Socialist Left. During the presidency of Patricio Aylwin he was in charge of reopening the Chilean embassy in Moscow in 1991, shortly before the fall of the Soviet Union; he served as ambassador to the Soviet Union, and then Russia, until 1992. During his tenure, he gave refuge to former East German president Erich Honecker, who was wanted by the authorities of reunified Germany to be tried for murder for responsibility in the shooting of people trying to cross the Berlin Wall. Despite Chile's objections, Russian president Boris Yeltsin ordered Honecker's deportation to Berlin, in what turned into a serious diplomatic incident.

After returning to Chile, Almeyda devoted himself to private life, writing his memoirs and working as an academic at the Department of Sociology at the University of Chile. Following his death, the Chilean government announced three national days of mourning. He is buried in Santiago General Cemetery.

== Tributes ==
In homage to Almeyda, the Extraordinary Congress of the Socialist Party of Chile, held in May 1998, as well as its library, was named after him.

== Honours and awards ==
=== Foreign honours ===
Ribbon	Distinction	Country	Date	Reference
	Grand Cross of the Order of the Sun of Peru	Peru	14 September 1971	
	Knight Grand Cross of the Order of Isabella the Catholic	Spain	7 June 1972	
	Order of Karl Marx	German Democratic Republic	11 February 1983	
	Gold Star of Peoples' Friendship	German Democratic Republic	11 February 1983	
	Order of Friendship of Peoples	Soviet Union	10 February 1988	
	Order of Friendship	Czechoslovakia	11 February 1988	

=== Honorary degrees ===
- Mexico: Honorary Degree from the University of Guadalajara, 24 October 1978
- German Democratic Republic: Honorary Degree from Wilhelm Pieck University, Rostock, 11 February 1983

== See also ==
- UN Trade and Development III

Political offices
Preceded by Juan Atala	Minister of Labor; 1952–1953	Succeeded by Leandro Moreno
Preceded by Rafael Tarud	Minister of Mining; 1953	Succeeded by Francisco Cuevas
Preceded by Gabriel Valdés	Minister of Foreign Affairs; 1970–1973	Succeeded by Orlando Letelier
Preceded by José Tohá	Minister of Defense; 1973	Succeeded by Carlos Prats
Preceded by Orlando Letelier	Minister of Foreign Affairs; 1973	Succeeded by Ismael Huerta
