= Vicente Merino =

Chilean politician and admiral

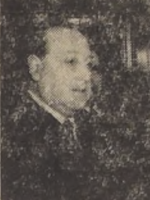

Navy Commander-in-chief
- In office 1943–1947
- President: Juan Antonio Ríos; Gabriel González Videla
- Preceded by: Julio Allard Pinto
- Succeeded by: Emilio Daroch

Acting President of Chile
- In office 3 August 1946 – 13 August 1946
- Preceded by: Alfredo Duhalde
- Succeeded by: Alfredo Duhalde

Minister of the Interior
- In office 27 June 1946 – 6 September 1946
- President: Alfredo Duhalde
- Preceded by: Alfredo Duhalde (acting)
- Succeeded by: Juan Antonio Iribarren

Personal details
- Born: 21 May 1889 Santiago, Chile
- Died: 30 January 1977 (aged 87) Santiago, Chile
- Spouse: Amelia Novoa

Military service
- Branch/service: Chilean Navy
- Rank: Vice Admiral

Vicente Merino Bielich (1 January 1889 – 30 January 1977) was a Chilean naval officer and politician.

He commanded the Chilean Navy during World War II and the Battle of the Caribbean.

== Early life ==
The son of a Navy Captain named Vicente Merino Jarpa, he briefly served as the acting president of Chile between August 3 and 13, 1946.

== Public career ==
He was the son of prominent Chilean naval officer Vicente Merino Jarpa, a veteran of the War of the Pacific and the 1891 Chilean Civil War, and Peruvian-born Esther Bielich Pomareda. He married Amelia Novoa Astaburuaga, with whom he had six children.

On 10 January 1944, Merino became Commander-in-Chief of the Chilean Navy, a position he held until his retirement in 1947.

In January 1946, he was appointed Minister of the Interior by Vice President Alfredo Duhalde Vásquez, serving until 6 September. From 3 to 13 August of that year, Merino served as Vice President of Chile after Duhalde temporarily stepped aside to pursue a presidential candidacy, which he withdrew ten days after his nomination.
