= Paula Narváez =

Chilean politician (born 1972)

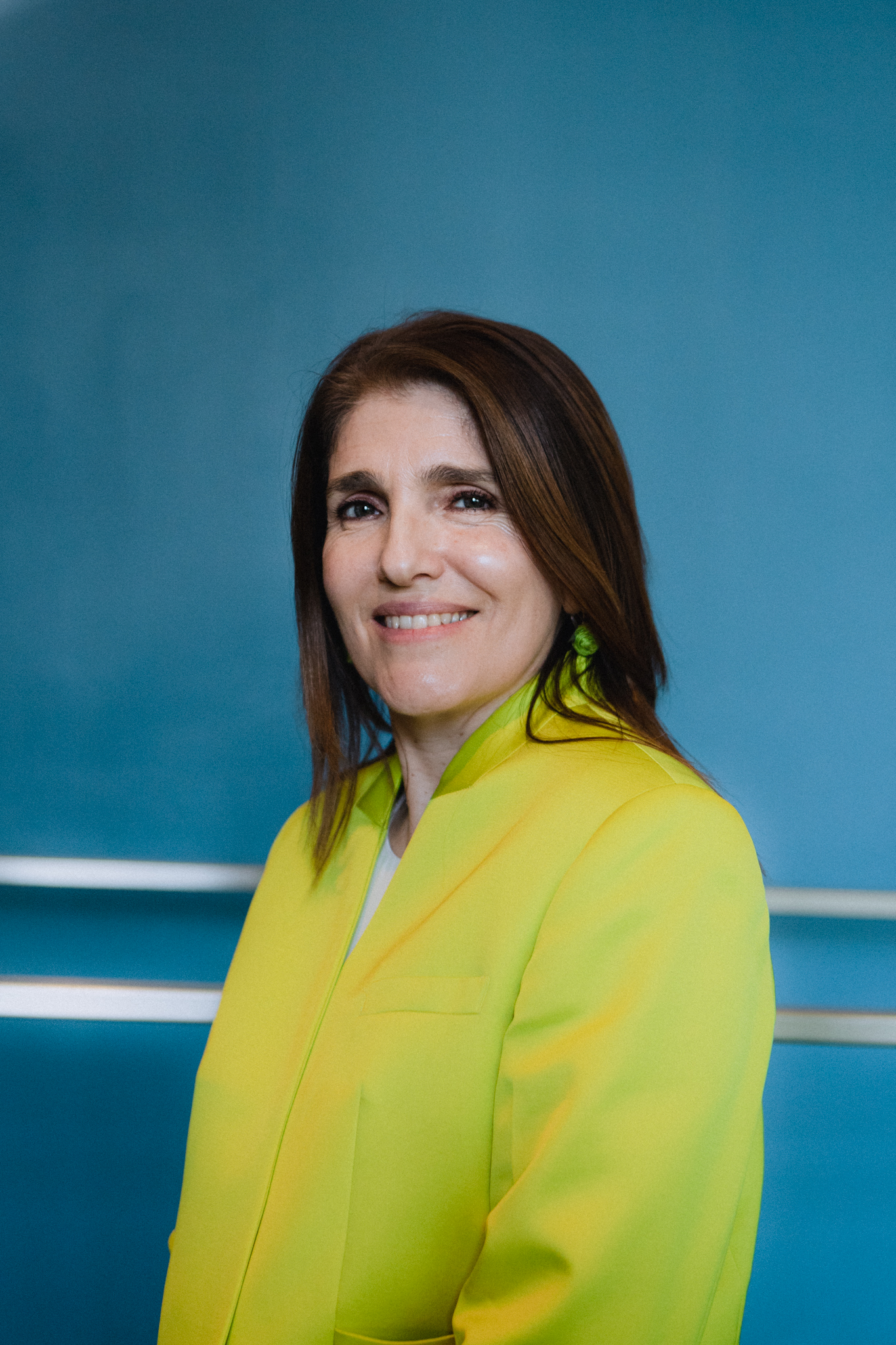
- Narváez in 2023

Permanent Representative of Chile to the United Nations
- Incumbent
- Assumed office 8 June 2022 until 18 January 2026
- Appointed by: Gabriel Boric
- Preceded by: Milenko Skoknic Tapia
- In office 18 November 2016 – 11 March 2018
- President: Michelle Bachelet
- Preceded by: Marcelo Díaz Díaz
- Succeeded by: Cecilia Pérez

Chief of Staff of La Moneda Palace
- In office 11 March 2014 – July 2014
- President: Michelle Bachelet
- Preceded by: Magdalena Piñera Echenique
- Succeeded by: Ana Lya Uriarte

Personal details
- Born: Paula Narváez Ojeda; 22 May 1972 (age 54) Osorno, Chile
- Party: Socialist
- Education: Andrés Bello National University; Georgetown University; Austral University of Chile
- Occupation: Psychologist, politician

Paula Narváez Ojeda (born 22 May 1972) is a Chilean politician and psychologist who is the United Nations Population Fund (UNFPA) Regional Director for Latin American and the Caribbean. She was Chile ambassador to the United Nations under President Gabriel Boric. She was elected as the seventy-ninth President of the United Nations Economic and Social Council on 27 July 2023.

She served as Minister Secretary General of Government during the second administration of Michelle Bachelet. Narváez was the nominee of the Socialist Party in the 2021 Chilean presidential election.

== Biography ==
Paula Narváez was born in Osorno, Chile, on 22 May 1972, and spent her childhood and youth in Puerto Montt. Her basic and secondary education took place at the Immaculate Conception school in that city. Later she traveled to Santiago, where she studied psychology at Andrés Bello University, graduating in 1996. She has a master's degree in Economics and Regional Management from Austral University and a master's in Latin American Studies from Georgetown University.

== Political career ==
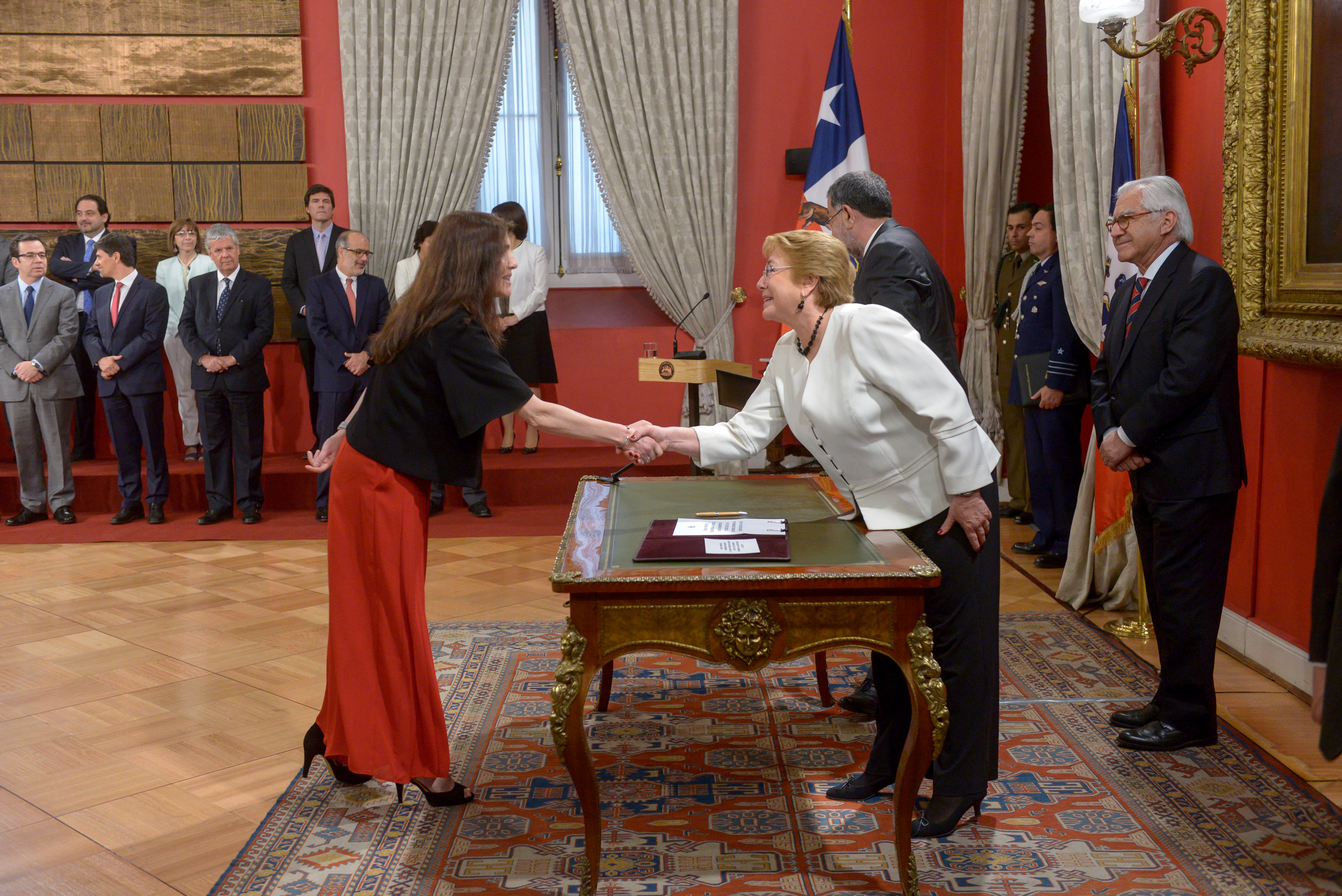
Narváez taking her oath as minister in 2016

Narváez entered public administration in Los Lagos Region, where she worked in the National Women's Service (SERNAM) and was regional secretary of labor. In the first government of Michelle Bachelet, she served as regional programming manager. In June 2008, she was designated by Bachelet as presidential delegate for Palena Province, on the occasion of the eruption of the volcano Chaitén that began in May of that year. She remained in the position until 5 May 2009.

In October 2009, she became lead spokesperson of Eduardo Frei Ruiz-Tagle, presidential candidate for the Concertación. In 2010, she traveled to India to study English, and upon her return to Chile that September, she worked at the Dialoga Foundation. In 2011, she emigrated to the United States to pursue a master's degree and to do an internship at UN Women – while Michelle Bachelet was executive director – where she was a program advisor for Latin America and the Caribbean.

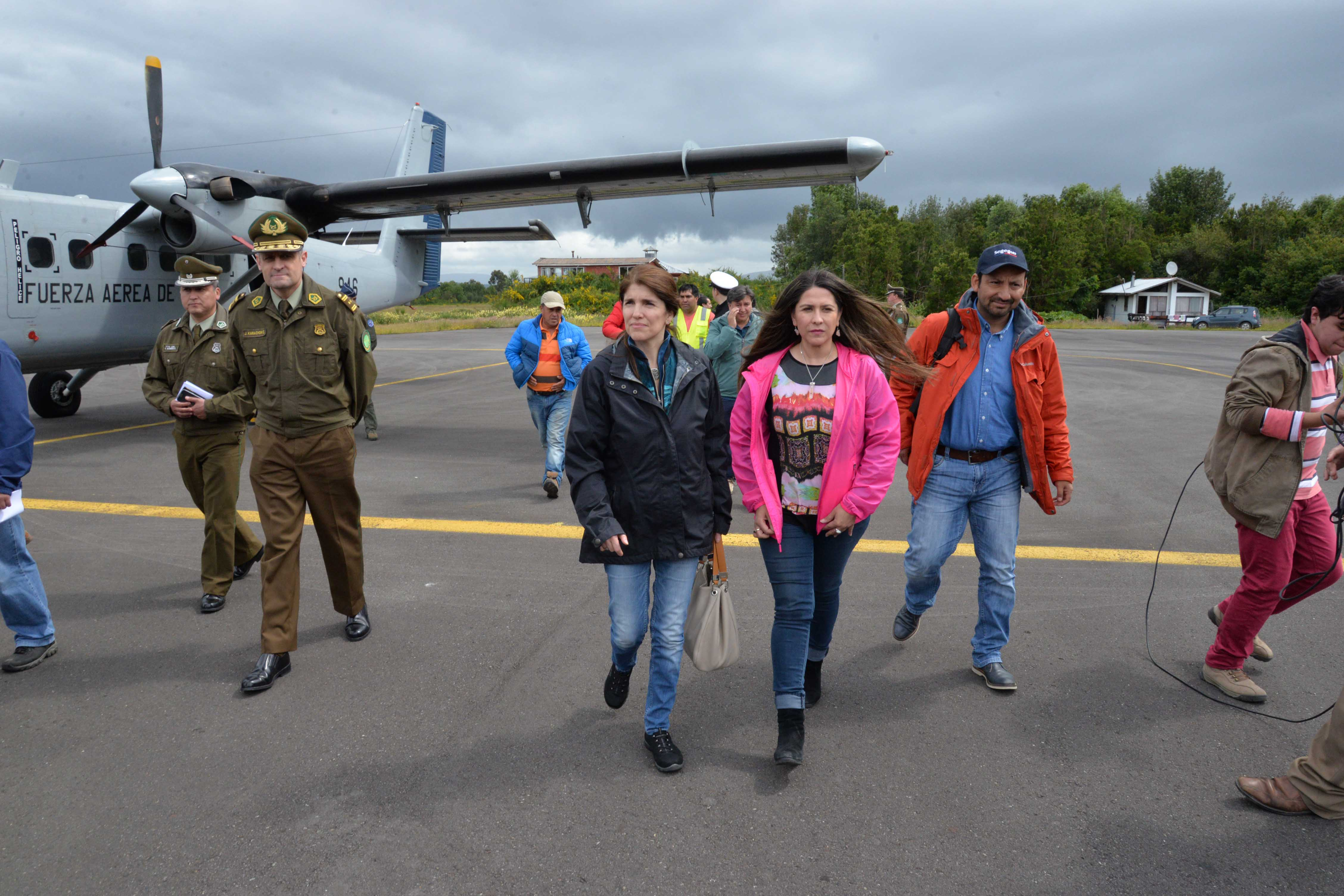
Narváez visiting the Los Lagos Region affected by the Chiloé earthquake of 2016.

She returned to Chile in 2014, when she was appointed chief of staff of Bachelet's second government, beginning on 11 March. She remained in office until July 2014, leaving due to her twin pregnancy and being replaced by Ana Lya Uriarte. On 18 November 2016, she was appointed by Bachelet as Minister Secretary General of Government, replacing Marcelo Díaz. She left office on 11 March 2018, at the end of the Bachelet government.

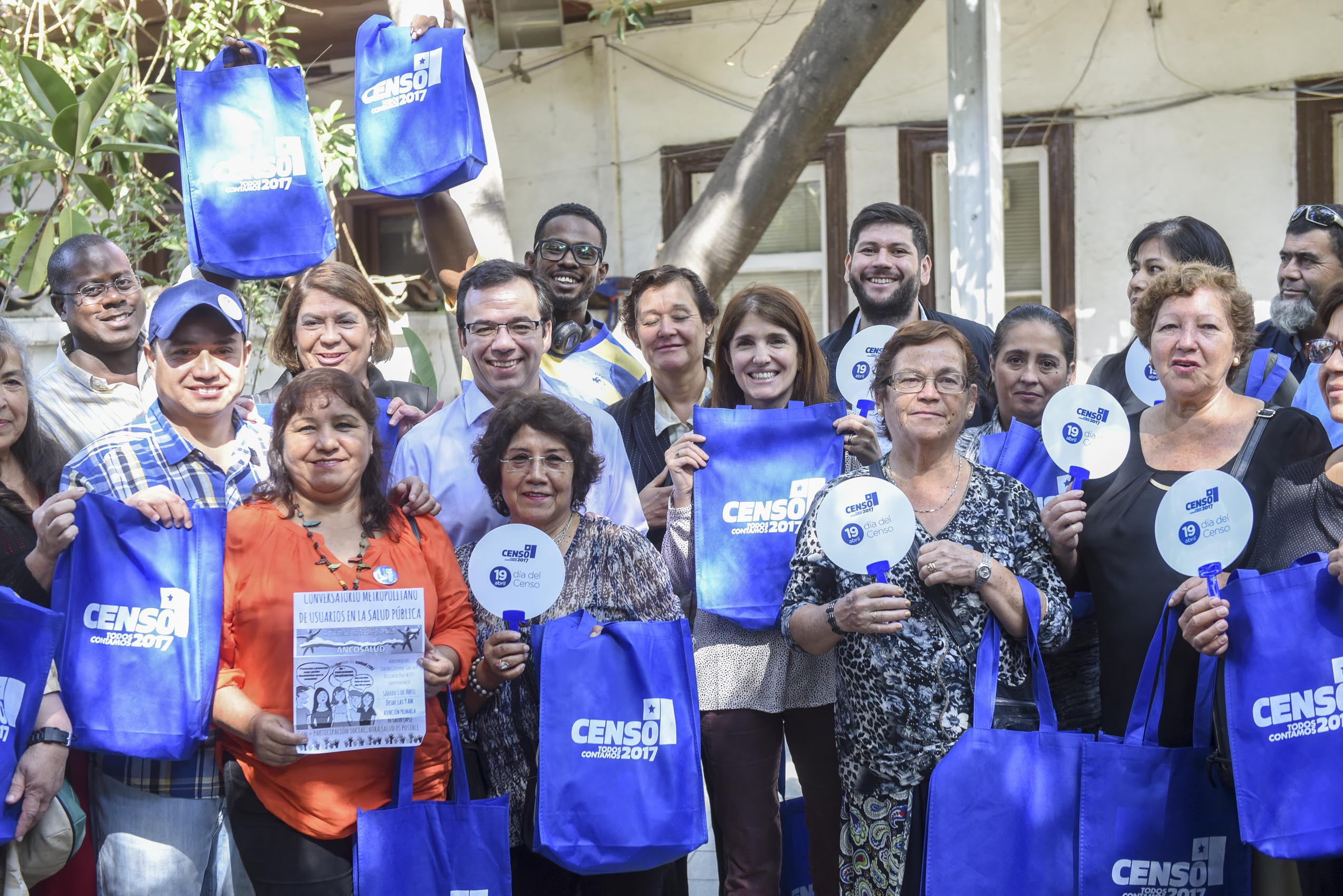
Narváez with social leaders in 2017.

Since 17 September 2018, she has been a specialist advisor on political participation of women in Latin America and the Caribbean for UN Women.

She has fiercely defended Bachelet's management, to the point that it was questioned by it Nueva Mayoría in 2017, when after the defeat of Alejandro Guillier against Sebastián Piñera, Narváez affirmed: "We suffered a huge electoral defeat, but the political defeat remains to be seen", arguing that despite the result "the political project of progressivism is in force in Chile" due to the reforms promoted by Bachelet. She served as a specialist advisor on women's political participation for Latin America and the Caribbean at the UN, from 17 September 2018. He resigned from office prior to announcing his presidential candidacy.

== Presidential election of 2021 ==
In December 2020, a group of women and grassroots militants of the Socialist Party wrote a letter entitled Never Again Without Us, proposing Paula Narváez as presidential candidate for the Chilean elections of 2021 and demanding open and citizen primaries. To date, the letter has received more than a thousand signatures, exceeding the original expectations of its authors, and was signed by the former president Michelle Bachelet. Also in December, a group of citizens created the "CiudadnxsPorPaula" platform, expanding Paula Narváez's support base beyond the Socialist Party of Chile.

On 13 January 2021, Narváez communicated on her Twitter account her decision to run as a presidential candidate for her party, writing:

From my dear Los Lagos Region, I thank all those who with their strength and conviction have joined the initiative that he assumes a duty with Chile. I have decided to put myself at the service of you and my country. I will run for the presidential candidacy in open and citizen primaries.

In April 2021, Narváez received the support of several celebrities from the culture area, including actor and National Prize winner, Héctor Noguera, actress Claudia Di Girolamo, composer Isabel Parra.

As a presidential candidate of the PS, PPD, PL and NT, presented its government program in June 2021, which has more than 400 measures Of these, the standard-bearer chose 40 measures as the most "urgent and priority", just as the former President Salvador Allende did during the campaign that led him to La Moneda in 1970. Among those highlighted, the former Minister is committed to the creation of 5 public companies to promote a "new development strategy", which would be the Public Bank for Development, the National Lithium Company, the National Green Hydrogen Company, the National Digital Agency and Codelco-Innova.

== Personal life ==
Paula Narváez is married to Javier Rico, with whom she has twin daughters. She regularly attends the Hindu Temple of Santiago, directed by the Brahmin priest Mahraj Ravi Kewlani.

== See also ==
- List of female Chilean presidential candidates

Diplomatic posts
Preceded by Milenko Skoknic	Permanent Representative of Chile to the United Nations; 2022 – 2026	Incumbent
