= Juan Somavía =

Chilean diplomat (b. 1941)

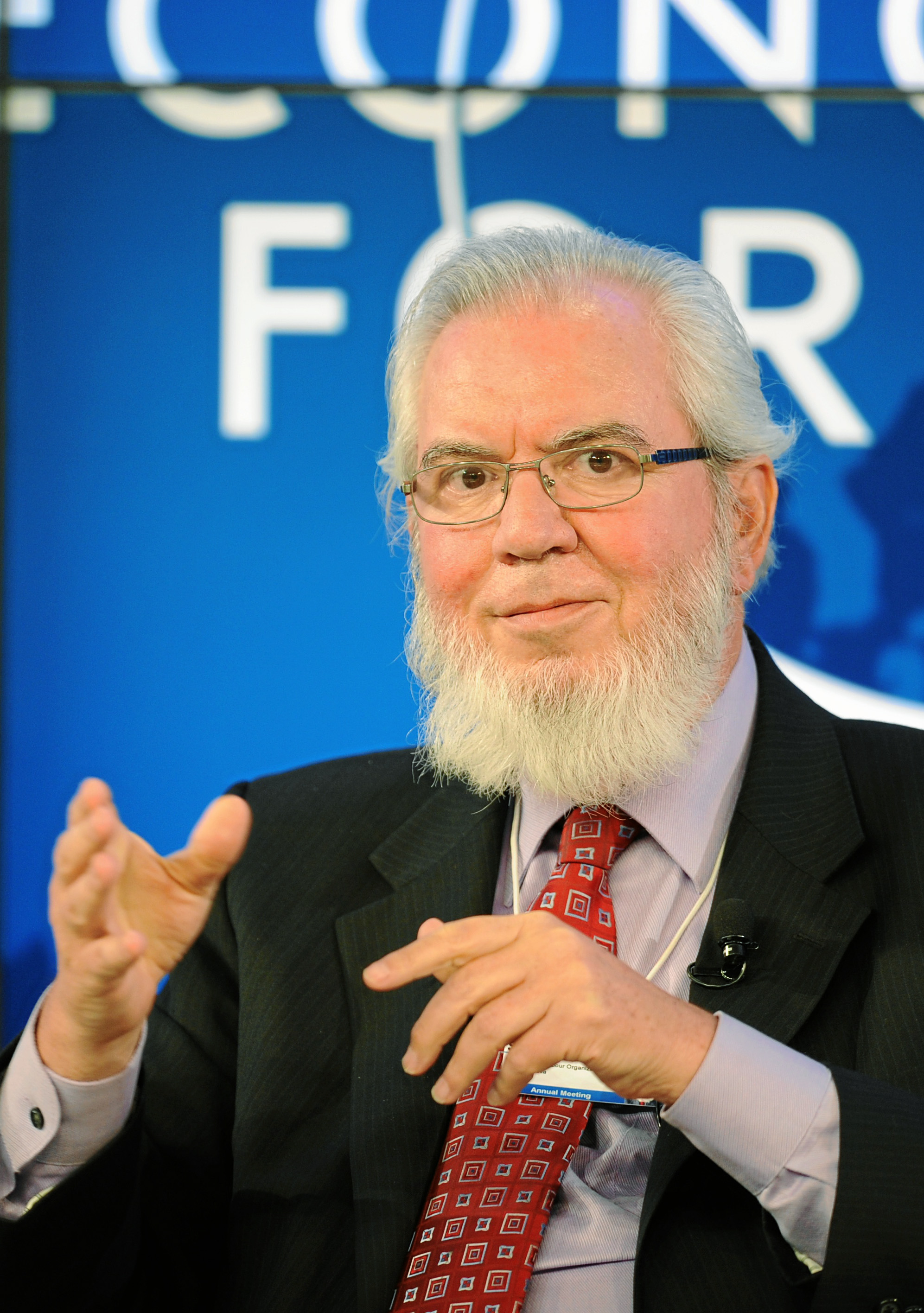
- Somavía in 2012

9th Director-General of the International Labour Organization
- In office March 4, 1999 – September 30, 2012
- Preceded by: Michel Hansenne
- Succeeded by: Guy Ryder

Permanent Representative of Chile to the United Nations
- In office 1990–1999
- Appointed by: Patricio Aylwin
- Preceded by: Pedro Daza
- Succeeded by: Juan Gabriel Valdés

Personal details
- Born: April 21, 1941 (age 85) Chile
- Spouse: Adriana Santa Cruz
- Education: Pontifical Catholic University of Chile (BA)

Juan Somavía Altamirano (born April 21, 1941) is the former Director-General of the International Labour Organization (ILO). He was elected to serve as the ninth Director-General of the ILO by the Governing Body on 23 March 1998. On 7 November 2013, he was appointed by UN Secretary-General Ban Ki-moon to serve as Special Adviser on Interregional Policy Cooperation.

== Term as Director-General ==
His five-year term of office began on 4 March 1999, when he became the first representative from the Southern hemisphere to head the organization. In March 2003, Somavia was re-elected for a second five-year term. He was re-elected for a third five-year term in November 2008.

Since taking office in 1999, Somavía has taken up the challenge that the rapidly changing economy presents to the ILO. In 1999, he submitted his Decent Work Agenda to the International Labour Conference, which was subsequently endorsed by the Governing Body and the Conference.

The work of the Office has been reorganized around four strategic objectives that make it possible to establish targets and indicators to measure progress and provide the basis of accountability: employment creation, rights at work, social protection and social dialogue.

== Background ==
An attorney by profession, Somavía has worked in civil and international affairs, serving as a diplomat and academic. His background spans public life, social development, business, and civil organizations, which informed his focus on international labor standards and employment opportunities.

The following is a list of the positions he held in the United Nations and other inter-governmental organizations before joining the ILO:

  - 1990–99: Permanent Representative of Chile to the United Nations in New York;
  - 1993–94, 1998–99: President of the United Nations Economic and Social Council;
  - 1996–97: Representative of Chile on the United Nations Security Council, including President of the Security Council in April 1996 and October 1997;
  - 1993–95: Chairman of the Preparatory Committee for the World Summit for Social Development, Copenhagen;
  - 1991–92: Chairman of the Social Committee of the United Nations Economic and Social Council;
  - 1990–91: Chairman of the United Nations Third Committee on Social, Humanitarian and Cultural Affairs;
  - 1970–73: Executive Secretary of the Latin American Free Trade Association in Chile; Ambassador of Chile to the Andean Group; Member and Chairman of the Governing Body of the Andean Group;
  - 1968–70: Ambassador and Adviser to the Foreign Minister of Chile on Economic and Social Affairs, responsible for multilateral issues including the ILO.

Somavía began his career as an academic. From 1967 to 1968, he was lecturer on economic and social issues for GATT's trade policy courses in Geneva. In 1971, he was appointed Professor of International Economic and Social Affairs in the Department of Political Sciences at the Catholic University of Chile, where he highlighted the ILO and its tripartite structure as a case study in international cooperation. Between 1976 and 1990, he was Founder, executive director and President of the Latin American Institute of Transnational Studies (ILET), during which time he undertook a number of studies on trade union and social movements in Mexico City and Santiago. From 1996 to 1999, Mr. Somavia was chairman of the Board of the United Nations Research Institute for Social Development (UNRISD). Throughout his career, he has written and lectured widely on trade issues and labour and human rights and holds numerous citations and awards for his work in the areas of peace, human rights and social development.

Somavía has always shown a strong interest in development cooperation and economic and social affairs. During the late 1960s, while working in General Agreement on Tariffs and Trade (GATT), he promoted the participation of developing countries in the Kennedy Round. From 1970 to 1973, Mr. Somavía served as Member and chairman of the Board of the Andean Development Corporation in Caracas and worked intensively in favour of regional integration. He was also a Member of the executive committee of the International Foundation for Development Alternatives in Nyon, Switzerland from 1977 to 1995 and has been on the Advisory Committee of Development Dialogue (published by the Dag Hammarskjöld Foundation) for more than 25 years.

Somavía participated actively in the restoration of democracy in Chile. Not only was he President of the International Commission of the Democratic Coalition in Chile but also founder and Secretary-General of the South American Peace Commission (1986–90). For his contribution to peace and human rights, he was awarded the "Leonides Proano Peace Prize" by the Latin American Human Rights Association.

Somavía has been involved in business, financial and civil society organizations for many years. As Executive Secretary of the Chilean-Argentinian Chamber of Commerce he strengthened ties between the business communities in both countries. From 1976 to 1982, Mr. Somavia was Coordinator of the Third World Forum, a network of African, Asian, Latin American and Caribbean social actors. He was also a member of the Board and Vice President for Latin America of the Third World News Agency, Inter Press Service (1976–89) based in Rome. Together with Gabriel García Márquez, Nobel Prize winner, Mr. Somavia represented Latin America as a Member of the MacBride Commission on International Communications (1980–82). Finally, he has served as Chairman of the United Nations Committee of Parliamentarians for Global Action.

Born on 21 April 1941, Somavía's early schooling took place in Chile, the Netherlands, Belgium, the United States and Ecuador. In 1958, he returned to his country to read law at the Catholic University of Chile. After graduating in 1962, he continued higher studies in economic development at the School of Law and Economics at the University of Paris. Somavia was made Laurea Honoris Causa in political sciences by the University of Turin in November 2001 and awarded a Doctorate Honoris Causa by the University of Paris I Panthéon-Sorbonne in May 2003.

He is married to Adriana Santa Cruz and they have two children.

== Footnotes ==
Diplomatic posts
Preceded by Pedro Daza	Permanent Representative of Chile to the United Nations; 1990 – 1999	Succeeded by Juan Gabriel Valdés
Positions in intergovernmental organisations
Preceded by Michel Hansenne	Director-General of the International Labour Organization; 1999–2012	Succeeded by Guy Ryder
