= Patricio Carvajal =

Chilean politician (1916–1994)

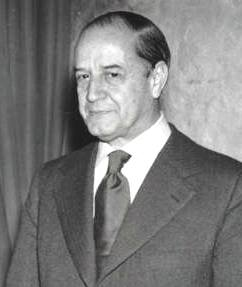

Defense Minister
- In office 15 December 1982 – 11 March 1990
- President: Augusto Pinochet
- Preceded by: Washington Carrasco
- Succeeded by: Patricio Rojas
- In office 11 September 1973 – 3 July 1974
- President: Augusto Pinochet
- Preceded by: Orlando Letelier
- Succeeded by: Oscar Bonilla

Minister of Foreign Affairs
- In office 11 July 1974 – 20 April 1978
- President: Augusto Pinochet
- Preceded by: Ismael Huerta
- Succeeded by: Hernán Cubillos

Personal details
- Born: Patricio Carvajal Prado; 16 July 1916 Santiago, Chile
- Died: 15 July 1994 (aged 77) Santiago, Chile
- Resting place: Parque del Recuerdo
- Party: Independent Democratic Union (UDI)
- Spouse: Teresa Carvallo

Military service
- Allegiance: Chile
- Branch/service: Chilean Navy
- Years of service: 1931–1990
- Rank: Vice admiral

Vice Admiral Patricio Carvajal Prado (16 July 1916 – 15 July 1994), was a Chilean admiral, several times Minister and one of the principal leaders of the 1973 Chilean coup d'état that ousted President Salvador Allende.

== Military career ==
He joined the navy in 1931, where he was a classmate of future Admiral José Toribio Merino, and together they were commissioned as ensigns in 1935. In 1941, he was promoted to lieutenant; in 1950, to captain and in 1955, to commander. Carvajal was an artillery specialist. In 1958, he was commissioned to study anti-submarine warfare. In 1960, was the commander of the training-ship Esmeralda. In 1966, was designed as Naval Attache to London. Since 1967, he was the Navy Chief of Staff. In 1973, he was the Armed Forces General Chief of Staff.

== Cabinet minister ==
Following the coup, he was appointed as Minister of Defense in 1973 and again from 1983 to 1990. He was also Chilean Minister of Foreign Affairs from 1974 to 1978. Carvajal committed suicide after a long bout with cancer.

Political offices
Preceded by Orlando Letelier	Minister of Defense; 1973–1974	Succeeded by Oscar Bonilla
Preceded by Ismael Huerta	Minister of Foreign Affairs; 1974–1978	Succeeded by Hernán Cubillos
Preceded by Washington Carrasco Fernández	Minister of Defense; 1982–1990	Succeeded by Patricio Rojas
