= Alfredo Duhalde =

Chilean politician (1898–1985)

Alfredo Duhalde Vásquez
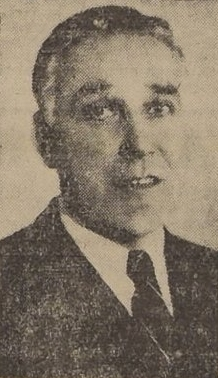
- Duhalde c. 1940

Vice President of Chile
- In office 13 August 1946 – 17 October 1946
- Preceded by: Vicente Merino Bielich
- Succeeded by: Juan Antonio Iribarren
- In office 17 January 1946 – 3 August 1946
- Preceded by: Juan Antonio Ríos (as President)
- Succeeded by: Vicente Merino Bielich

Member of the Senate
- In office 15 May 1945 – 15 May 1953
- Constituency: 9th Provincial Grouping (Valdivia, Osorno, Llanquihue, Chiloé, Aysén, and Magallanes)

Minister of the Interior
- In office 24 September 1945 – 17 January 1946
- President: Juan Antonio Ríos
- Preceded by: Luis Álamos Barros
- Succeeded by: Vicente Merino Bielich

Minister of National Defense
- In office 2 April 1942 – 7 June 1943
- President: Juan Antonio Ríos
- Preceded by: Luis Álamos Barros
- Succeeded by: Vicente Merino Bielich
- In office 10 January 1940 – 24 October 1940
- President: Pedro Aguirre Cerda
- Preceded by: Guillermo Labarca
- Succeeded by: Juvenal Hernández

Member of the Chamber of Deputies
- In office 15 May 1933 – 15 May 1937
- Constituency: 22nd Departmental Grouping (Valdivia, La Unión, and Osorno)
- In office 6 August 1924 – 11 September 1924
- Succeeded by: Congress dissolved
- Constituency: Llanquihue and Carelmapu

Personal details
- Born: 30 June 1898 Río Bueno, Chile
- Died: 10 April 1985 (aged 86) Santiago, Chile
- Party: Radical Party (1920–1946); Democratic Radical Party (1946–1949)
- Spouse: Yolanda Heufmann (m. 1923)
- Children: 7
- Education: University of Chile
- Profession: Lawyer

Alfredo Duhalde Vásquez (30 June 1898 – 10 April 1985) was a Chilean lawyer, banker, and politician.

A member of the Radical Party, he served in several ministerial positions and as a member of both chambers of the National Congress of Chile. He twice exercised executive authority as Vice President of Chile in 1946, initially during the illness of President Juan Antonio Ríos and subsequently following Ríos's death.

Duhalde subsequently held several positions outside national politics. He served as director and president of Banco Osorno-La Unión between 1960 and 1966, was president of the Chilean Athletics Federation, and was associated with the company Duhalde, Dibarrant y Compañía. He also served as honorary president of football club Colo-Colo.

== Early life and education ==
Duhalde was born in Río Bueno on 30 June 1898, the son of Pedro Duhalde Etchebarne and Zoila Rosa Vásquez Martínez. His father was born in Louhossoa, France, while his mother was from Quilacahuín, Chile.

Duhalde received his primary and secondary education at the Liceo de Aplicación in Santiago. He subsequently studied at the School of Law of the University of Chile, where he qualified as a lawyer.

He had a son, painter Walter Luis Duhalde Gallo, from a relationship with María Gallo of Río Bueno. In 1923, he married Yolanda Heufmann Ellwanger (1902-1998), with whom he had six children: René, Yolanda, Sara, Marta, Carmen, and Sonia.

== Political career ==
Duhalde was involved in agricultural activities in Río Bueno and La Unión for much of his life and was one of the founders of Banco Agrícola. He later devoted himself to politics and joined the Radical Party.

In the 1924 parliamentary election, Duhalde was elected to the Chamber of Deputies of Chile for Llanquihue and Carelmapu for the 1924–1927 legislative term. He formally took office on 6 August 1924. His term ended prematurely when the National Congress was dissolved on 11 September 1924 following the coup d'état of 1924.

In the 1932 parliamentary election, he was again elected to the Chamber of Deputies, this time representing the 22nd Departmental Grouping of Valdivia, Osorno, and La Unión for the 1933–1937 term. During this period, he served on the Permanent Commission for Development, Roads and Public Works.

Under President Pedro Aguirre Cerda, Duhalde was appointed Minister of National Defense on 10 January 1940, serving until 24 October of that year. President Juan Antonio Ríos appointed him to the same position on 2 April 1942, and he remained in office until 7 June 1943. He also served as acting Minister of Foreign Affairs from 21 to 26 October 1942.

In the 1945 parliamentary election, Duhalde was elected to the Senate of Chile for the 9th Provincial Grouping, comprising the provinces of Valdivia, Osorno, Llanquihue, Chiloé, Aysén, and Magallanes, for the 1945–1953 term. He served on the Permanent Commission for National Defense.

During his parliamentary career, Duhalde introduced several motions that subsequently became law. These concerned matters including changes to the boundaries of the commune of Valdivia, the functions of local judges in San José de la Mariquina, benefits for the Valdivia Fire Department, municipal borrowing by La Unión, and regulations governing the purchase and sale of animal hair.

On 24 September 1945, Duhalde returned to the Ríos administration as Minister of the Interior. While holding this position, he assumed the vice-presidency as President Ríos became increasingly unable to exercise his duties because of illness.

== Vice presidency ==
On 17 January 1946, Duhalde assumed executive authority as Vice President of Chile while Juan Antonio Ríos remained President but was unable to exercise the office because of his deteriorating health.

Shortly after Duhalde assumed executive authority, his administration faced significant labour unrest. A demonstration held at Plaza Bulnes on 28 January 1946 was suppressed by the authorities, resulting in six deaths and numerous injuries. The incident became known as the Plaza Bulnes massacre.

President Ríos died on 27 June 1946. As vice president, Duhalde was responsible for arranging the presidential election to choose Ríos's successor. He also sought the Radical Party's presidential nomination.

On 3 August 1946, Duhalde temporarily relinquished the vice-presidency to his Interior Minister, Vice Admiral Vicente Merino Bielich, while seeking his party's presidential nomination. Duhalde represented the party's more conservative wing but was ultimately defeated for the nomination by Gabriel González Videla.

Duhalde resumed executive authority on 13 August 1946. He remained vice president until 17 October, when he resigned shortly before González Videla was due to assume the presidency. Interior Minister Juan Antonio Iribarren succeeded him as vice president.

After leaving the government, Duhalde returned to his Senate seat. He also left the Radical Party and joined the Democratic Radical Party.

Duhalde died in Santiago on 10 April 1985, aged 86.
