= Rudecindo Ortega =

Chilean politician

Rudecindo Ortega Mason
- Ortega Mason in 1942

President of the United Nations General Assembly
- In office 1956
- Preceded by: José Maza Fernández
- Succeeded by: Wan Waithayakon

Permanent Representative of Chile to the United Nations
- In office 1953 – 1956
- President: Carlos Ibáñez del Campo
- Preceded by: Hernán Santa Cruz
- Succeeded by: Roberto Aldunate León

Senator of the Republic of Chile for the 8th Provincial Group, Biobío & Cautín
- In office April 22, 1940 – 1949

Minister of Education
- In office December 24, 1938 – February 1940
- President: Pedro Aguirre Cerda
- Preceded by: Guillermo Correa Fuenzalida
- Succeeded by: Juan Antonio Iribarren

Deputy of the Republic of Chile for the 21st Departmental Group
- In office 1926 – 1938

Personal details
- Born: Rudecindo Segundo Ortega Mason; June 3, 1899 Temuco, Chile
- Died: October 10, 1962 (aged 63) Santiago, Chile
- Party: Radical (until 1948); Partido Radical Doctrinario (after 1948)
- Education: University of Chile (LL.B)
- Occupation: Lawyer & politician

Rudecindo Ortega Mason (June 3, 1896 – October 10, 1962) was a Chilean politician who served as President of the United Nations General Assembly and Permanent Representative of Chile to the United Nations.

== Personal life ==
He was born on June 3, 1899, and died on October 10, 1962.

== Career ==
In 1923, he started teaching at Instituto Nacional General José Miguel Carrera. He served as president on Commission for Education in Chamber of Deputies of Chile. He was Minister for Education during first Pedro Aguirre Cerda ministry.

In 1953, he was appointed as Chile's permanent ambassador to the United Nations by president Carlos Ibáñez del Campo. He presided over the Security Council. In addition, he held the presidency of the UN Commission on Human Rights. In 1956, he presided over the first and second special emergency sessions of the United Nations General Assembly.
