= Juan Antonio Iribarren =

President of Chile (1946)

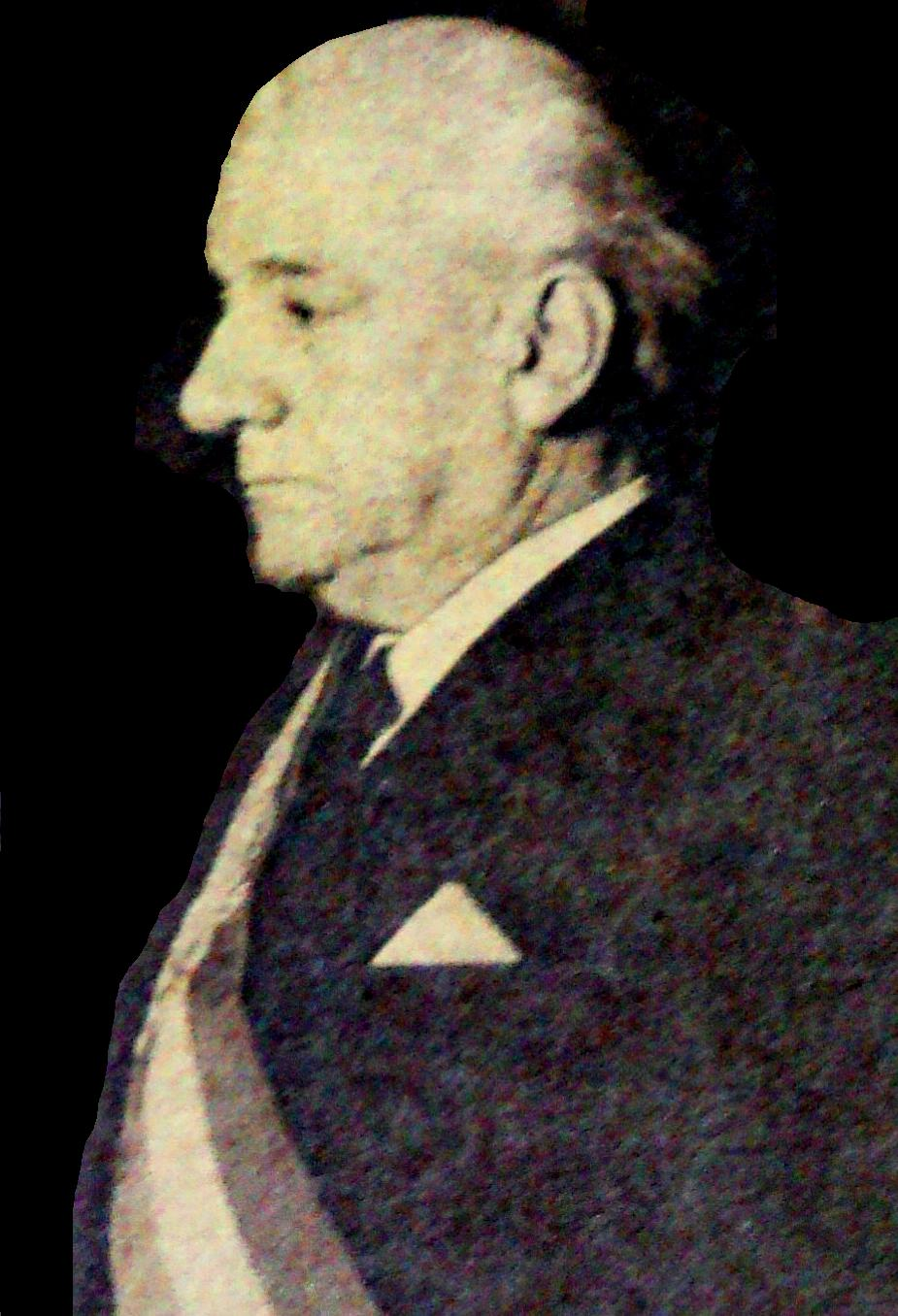

Acting President of Chile
- In office 17 October 1946 – 3 November 1946
- Preceded by: Alfredo Duhalde
- Succeeded by: Gabriel González Videla

Minister of the Interior
- In office 6 September 1946 – 17 October 1946
- President: Alfredo Duhalde (acting)
- Preceded by: Vicente Merino Bielich
- Succeeded by: Luis Alberto Cuevas

Minister of Public Education
- In office 14 May 1945 – 3 February 1946
- President: Juan Antonio Ríos
- Preceded by: Enrique Marshall Herrera
- Succeeded by: Benjamín Claro Velasco
- In office 8 February 1940 – 10 June 1941
- President: Pedro Aguirre Cerda
- Preceded by: Rudecindo Ortega
- Succeeded by: Raimundo del Río

Personal details
- Born: 7 May 1885 Vicuña, Chile
- Died: 11 April 1968 (aged 82) Santiago, Chile
- Party: Radical
- Education: University of Chile
- Occupation: Lawyer; politician; professor

Juan Antonio Iribarren Cabezas (Vicuña, 7 May 1885 – Santiago, 11 April 1968) was a Chilean military officer and politician who served as Vice President of Chile from 17 October to 3 November 1946, when he transferred power to President Gabriel González Videla.

== Biography ==
Iribarren studied at the Liceo de La Serena and later at the University of Chile, where he earned a law degree. He also pursued a military career, attaining the rank of colonel in the Chilean Army before retiring from active service.

He served as president of a committee established to pay tribute to Gabriela Mistral, which contributed to the establishment of the Gabriela Mistral Cultural Centre in Vicuña, now known as the Gabriela Mistral Museum.

== Political career ==
President Juan Antonio Ríos appointed him Minister of Education in 1942. Following Ríos's death on 27 June 1946, Vice President Alfredo Duhalde called a new presidential election for 4 September, which was won by Gabriel González Videla with a plurality of the vote.

The tense negotiations surrounding González Videla's ratification by the Plenary Congress on 24 October led him to pressure Duhalde to resign in favour of Juan Antonio Iribarren, who was then serving as Minister of the Interior.

Faced with the possibility that Congress might not ratify his election, González Videla sought an administration favourable to him. Although Duhalde was also a member of the Radical Party, he was not politically close to González Videla. The latter ultimately succeeded in securing the change of government.

Iribarren was a professor at the Faculty of Law, University of Chile, where he held the chair of General History of Law from 1918 to 1954.

He died at a private clinic in the commune of Ñuñoa at 7:00 p.m. on 11 April 1968. His body lay in state at the headquarters of the Radical Party, at Agustinas 620, and he was subsequently buried at the Santiago General Cemetery. During his lifetime, Iribarren had requested that his remains eventually be transferred to Vicuña.
