= José Piñera =

Chilean economist and free market reformer

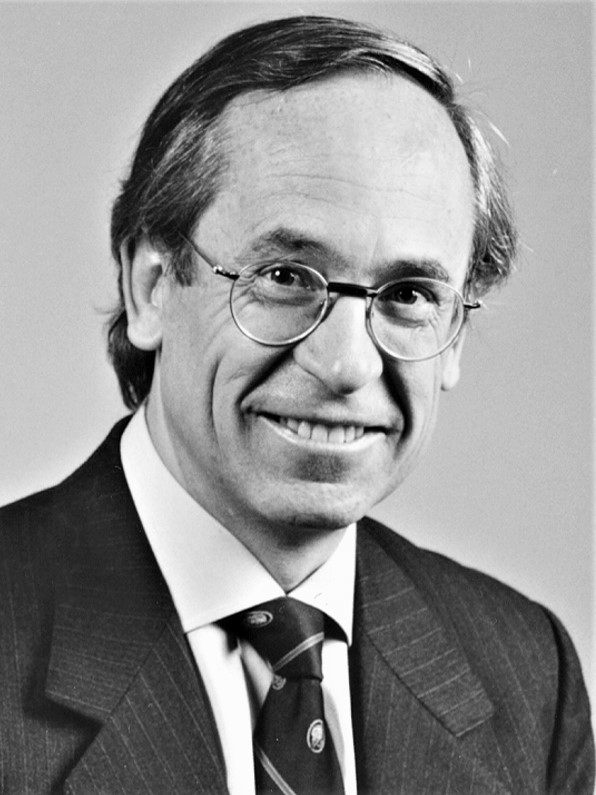

Labour and Social Forecast Minister
- In office 26 December 1978 – 29 December 1980
- President: Augusto Pinochet
- Preceded by: Vasco Costa
- Succeeded by: Miguel Kast

Mining Minister
- In office 29 December 1980 – 4 December 1981
- President: Augusto Pinochet
- Preceded by: Carlos Quiñones
- Succeeded by: Hernán Felipe Errázuriz

Personal details
- Born: 6 October 1948 (age 78) Santiago, Chile
- Party: Independent
- Education: Pontifical Catholic University of Chile (BA); Harvard University (MA, PhD)

José Piñera Echenique (born 6 October 1948) is a Chilean economist, one of the famous Chicago Boys, who served as minister of Labor and Social Security, and of Mining, in the military dictatorship of Augusto Pinochet. He is the architect of Chile's private pension system based on personal retirement accounts. Piñera has been called "the world's foremost advocate of privatizing public pension systems" as well as "the Pension Reform Pied Piper" (by The Wall Street Journal). He is now Distinguished Senior Fellow at the Cato Institute, a libertarian think tank based in Washington, President of the International Center for Pension Reform based in Santiago, Senior Fellow at the Italian libertarian think tank Istituto Bruno Leoni, and member of the advisory board of the Vienna-based Educational Initiative for Central and Eastern Europe. He has a master's degree and a Ph.D. in economics from Harvard University. Piñera is a board member in Chile and an active supporter of SOS Children's Villages, the largest orphan and abandoned children's charity in the world.

He is the elder brother of former president Sebastián Piñera with whom he had a longstanding conflict.

== Early life and family ==
José Piñera Echenique is the son of Manuel José Piñera Carvallo, Chile's Ambassador to the United Nations during the government of President Eduardo Frei Montalva (1964–1970). His uncle Archbishop Bernardino Piñera (100) was twice elected President of Chile's Council of Bishops. He has three younger brothers: Sebastián Piñera, a businessman-politician and Chile's president who has served for two terms: between 2010 and 2014, and from 2018 to 2022; with whom he has a longstanding conflict about public policies. Pablo Piñera, managing director of Banco del Estado and former member of the board of the Central Bank; and Miguel Piñera, a musician. He also has two sisters, Guadalupe and Magdalena. His maternal lineage is of Basque descent and his paternal lineage is of Asturian descent.

Piñera graduated in 1970 as an economist from the Universidad Católica de Chile, at that time closely associated with the Department of Economics of the University of Chicago. In this same year, 1970, he began graduate studies at Harvard University. In 1972 he received his M.A. and in 1974 his Ph.D. in economics. He was a Teaching Fellow at Harvard and an assistant professor at Boston University. Piñera returned to Chile in 1975 as a professor of the Catholic University of Chile. He has written eight books and numerous essays and articles. He was awarded an honorary degree at Universidad Francisco Marroquin.

== Economic reformer ==
=== Overall review ===
After promoting a plan of free market reforms that he considered could double Chile's annual rate of growth to 7%, he became, first, Secretary of Labor and Social Security (1978–1980), and then, Secretary of Mining (1980–1981), in the cabinet of General Augusto Pinochet. As such, he was responsible for four structural reforms: the creation of a retirement system based on private personal accounts (the AFP system), the opening of the private health and disability insurance system, the redesign of the labor code changing the terms of trade union elections, and the constitutional law on mining. Piñera entered the cabinet in December 1978 when Chile faced two serious external threats: a possible war with Argentina over the disputed Beagle Islands and a trade boycott by the American AFL-CIO labor confederation. Piñera quickly announced that Chile would soon promulgate a new trade union law reestablishing labor democracy in Chile (suspended since the coup d'état, September 11, 1973) and a new collective bargaining law. At the same time, the Vatican offered mediation over the Beagle Islands.

=== Labor reform ===
Piñera followed up on June 29, 1979, announcing a package of four related laws that transformed trade union legislation in Chile:

1. D.L. 2.756 reinstituted free trade unions, requiring secret votes to elect union officials and allowing free union affiliation within a company;
2. D.L. 2.757 regulated the creation and operation of trade and professional organisations;
3. D.L. 2.758 created a new decentralized collective bargaining process, whose main pillars were:
  1. bargaining takes place between the trade union and the employer at the company level, rather than the traditional industry or national level;
  2. the right to strike is defined as one of refusal to work without being fired, but not necessarily as one entailing the forced closing of productive activities;
  3. allowed employers to impose a lockout when some but not all unions are on strike;
  4. prohibited any government intervention in the process;
  5. instituted a mechanism of "pendulum arbitration" (also known as final offer) in public services, where disagreement led not to strikes but to compulsory arbitration by private sector arbiters, who were mandated by law to choose either the last company offer or the last trade union demand, but could not split the difference.
4. D.L. 2.759 solved specific labor problems and strengthened the anti-monopoly law.

=== Social security reform ===
On November 4, 1980, Piñera's Social Security Reforms were instituted via Decree Laws 3.500 and 3.501). These allowed workers to opt out of the government-run pension system and instead put the former payroll tax (10% of wages) in a privately managed Personal Retirement Account (PRA). New workers were automatically enrolled in the new system. These measures resulted in a privatization of Chile's social security system. This same Reform introduced two important changes to the health system: a) it fully privatized the disability insurance system, which became an integral part of the so-called "AFP system" (the AFPs are the private companies that manage the PRAs on workers' behalf); and, b) it allowed workers to opt out from the government health insurance system with all their mandatory contribution (another 7% of wages), as long as they were willing and able to buy with that money a minimum health insurance plan in what became the "ISAPRE system" (ISAPREs are private companies that offer diverse health insurance plans).

The above-mentioned reform had a major impact on Chile's economy and society. By February 2011, 8.8 million individuals had a PRA. Because of movements in and out of the labor force, this number cannot be directly related to the current labor force of 7 million, out of a working-age population of 12.6 million. As regards ISAPREs, they counted for 1.2 million contributors in December 2010, who with their dependants provided health coverage to 2.7 million persons, representing about one-sixth of the total Chilean population of 16.5 million at that time. The proportion of persons covered by ISAPREs has been reducing since the mid-1990s, when it peaked at just over 25% of the population.

The PRAs annual average rate of return since inception in May 1981 has been 9.27% a year, above inflation, according to the official statistics (for Fondo C) compiled by the Superintendency of Pensions (www.safp.cl). The resources accumulated in the workers accounts amount to $150 billion, or approximately 72% of Chile's GNP. According to William Lewis, total government expenditures in Chile as a percentage of GDP declined from 34.3% in 1984 to 21.9% in 1990, and of that 12.4 points decline, social security and welfare changes accounted for half.

Economist Paul Craig Roberts, who is known as the "Father of Reaganomics", has noted, that "Chile was the first country in the world to privatize Social Security. Piñera played the key role. Privatizing the pension system would have been enough to earn Piñera his place in history, but he also oversaw the privatization of health care".

Some analysts and journalists have criticized the Chilean pension system, pointing out, for example, that it did not require the self-employed to contribute or arguing that it imposed excessive administrative costs. From a different angle, a paper published by the Institute of Economic Affairs showed that the Chilean model had indeed some shortcomings. But surprisingly to some, it argued that these were a result of overregulation.

A report submitted in 2006 by a bipartisan, government-appointed, Commission concluded that the system was working better than expected for the employed workers, that it was now technically possible and socially advisable to make the capitalisation system also compulsory for the self-employed, and that the fiscal savings arising from the transition process allowed for a strengthening and extension of the already existing safety net (consisting of a "pension asistencial" and a "pension minima", that will be combined into a "pensíon basica").

=== Mining reform ===
On December 1, 1981, Piñera obtained approval for the Constitutional Mining Law. The law was ratified by a 7–0 vote in the Constitutional Court. The law created the legal framework supportive of the subsequent privatisation of large state-owned companies, notably in the energy and telecommunications sectors. In the 1990s, the concession system introduced by the Mining Law was extended into the infrastructure sector – highways, ports and airports – which had traditionally been part of the so-called public works carried out by the State.

== Piñera on democracy ==
In December 1979, Piñera, while Secretary of Labor and Social Security, gave an important interview to the magazine Qué Pasa promoting his vision of a free and democratic Chile. In August 1980, Piñera signed the 1980 Constitution that established the transition path toward free elections in Chile.

In April 1981, Piñera, while Secretary of Mining, confronted General Pinochet in a cabinet meeting to prevent the leading trade union leader, Manuel Bustos, from being exiled. As a result, the order was rescinded. A year after Piñera resigned his Ministry position in December 1981, Manuel Bustos was exiled to Rio de Janeiro.

On December 2, 1981, the day after approval of the Mining Law, Piñera resigned in order to restart his opinion magazine Economia y Sociedad, which was dedicated to fight for the transition to a democratic system and the consolidation of the free-market economy. In those years, still under the military regime, Piñera wrote seventy articles in the press in defense of human rights and democracy.

In March 1990, after Chile's transition to democracy, he founded the "Proyecto Chile 2010". He described the goal as making Chile a developed country at its bicentenary. In 1992, in order to prove that the poor could understand free market solutions to their problems, he ran and was elected city councilman with the highest vote for one of Santiago's poorest neighborhoods, Conchalí. In 1993, in order to defend and explain to the population at large his free market reforms, he ran a testimonial presidential campaign as an independent. As a result, his legacy has been kept intact by the four Concertacion governments in the period 1990–2010.

In December 2009, Piñera shared a panel with the Polish trade union leader Lech Wałęsa in an International Conference in Zagreb dedicated to the theme of the prospects of democracy in Europe 20 years after the fall of the Berlin Wall. The conference was organized by Damian von Stauffenberg, member of the famed aristocratic family that opposed Hitler, and president of the Educational Initiative for Central and Eastern Europe (EICEE). Diario Financiero of Chile published this note and Ian Vasquez, Director of Cato's Institute for Global Liberty, wrote that both Piñera and Lech Wałęsa "have done so much to increase human freedom: Wałęsa for leading a workers' movement that played a key role in the collapse of Soviet communism; and José Piñera for leading a revolution in private pensions that is turning workers into capitalists around the world."

== Promoter of privatized pensions ==
In 1994, Piñera founded "The International Center for Pension Reform" in order to promote the Chilean model throughout the world. In 1995, he became also the co-chair of the United States Cato Institute's Project on Social Security Choice. Since then he is said to have visited around 80 countries, 28 of which have implemented personal retirement accounts following the "Piñera model". Unable to finance the transition toward a fully funded system, most of them combined it with their former state-run defined-benefit pension scheme.

The President of the "International Federation of Pension Fund Managers" has commented: "Towards the end of the year 2006, 28 countries (11 in Latin America, 12 in Central and Eastern Europe and five in other parts of the world) had already introduced mandated pension programs based on individual capitalization in their respective social security systems. A total of 100 million workers now have pension savings accounts in this type of program and have built up funds of over US$ 255 billions. Ukraine and Romania have already enacted reforms – to be implemented between 2008 and 2009 which include the introduction of mandated capitalization programs in their respective social security systems."

In 1997, José Piñera met with the then-governor of Texas, George W. Bush, who would become President of the United States between 2001 and 2009, and who, during his 2000 presidential campaign, stated that 'Modernization must include individually controlled, voluntary personal retirement accounts, which will augment the Social Security safety net'

In June 2007, the South African press published an article titled "Applying passion to break poverty" reporting on Piñera's conferences in Cape Town, Johannesburg and Durban.

In May 2008, Richard Rahn, Chairman of the Institute for Global Economic Growth, wrote in The Washington Times: "If you were asked to name one person who has enabled more people to gain wealth and security than any other person on the globe, who would you name? In 1881, here in Berlin, Otto von Bismarck started the world's first modern pay-as-you-go social security system which served as the model for the U.S. Social Security system and that of many other countries, including setting the retirement age at 65. No, Bismarck is not the answer to the opening question. The answer is Jose Pinera."

Following the ideas of Jose Pinera, in January 2026, Irland launched "My Future Fund", a new government program which is incorporated into the pensión system of Chile based on personal retirement accounts.

== Economía y Sociedad ==
In November 2016, Piñera relaunched Economía y Sociedad, a magazine that was founded by him in 1978. This magazine contains articles about economics, politics, social reforms, history and other interesting issues of public policies and today is a means to diffuse and defend liberal ideas in Chile. In 2025, Piñera launched his new book "A House of Freedoms".

== Awards ==
- "John S. Bickley Gold Medal" (1999), International Insurance Society
- "Hall of Fame" (2000), International Insurance Society
- "Champion of Liberty" (2003), Goldwater Institute (libertarian think tank)
- "Liberty Award" (2005), Liberalni Institut, Prague
- "Golden Umbrella Award" (2007), Stockholm Network (London based network of think tanks)
- "Adam Smith Award" (2009), Association of Private Enterprise Education

== External links and sources ==
- José Piñera's bilingual homepage (in Spanish and English)
- Dr. Honoris Causa at University Francisco Marroquín
- Appearances on C-SPAN
- Webpage at Cato Institute
