= Santa Cruz (surname) =

Santa Cruz, or Santacruz, or de la Santacruz, are surnames of Spanish and Portuguese origin, evolving from Latin to medieval Castilian, Sancta Crux → Santa Cruz, referring to the holy cross, a symbol of Christianity. Family records are documented in Castile, Aragon, and Navarre during the XV century.

== Notable people with this name ==
=== Arts and entertainment ===
- Abel Santa Cruz (1915–1995), major Argentine screenwriter
- Daniel Santacruz (born 1976), American musician, singer and record producer
- Francesc Santacruz i Artigas (fl. 1665–1721), Catalan sculptor
- Kendra Santacruz (born 1989), Mexican television actress
- Pedro Ferriz Santacruz (1921–2013), veteran radio and television presenter in Mexico

=== Sports ===
- Danilo Santacruz (born 1995), Paraguayan footballer
- Estéban Santa Cruz (1885–?), Cuban baseball player
- Hugo Santacruz (born 1989), Paraguayan footballer
- Javier Flores Santacruz (born 1986), Spanish footballer
- José Armando Santa Cruz (born 1980), a Mexican boxer
- Rafael Carlos Santacruz (born 1983), Spanish footballer
- Roque Santa Cruz (born 1981), Paraguayan footballer
- Victor Santa Cruz (born 1972), American college football coach

=== Other people ===
- Álvaro de Bazán, 1st Marquis of Santa Cruz (1526–1588), Spanish admiral
- Andrés de Santa Cruz (1792–1865), president of Peru and Bolivia
- Hernán Santa Cruz (1906–1999), Chilean lawyer and diplomat
- José Santacruz Londoño (1943–1996), Colombian drug lord
- Lorenzo Carbonell Santacruz (1883–1968), mayor of Alicante, 1931–1936
- Manuel Santa Cruz Loidi (1842–1926), Spanish Carlist guerilla leader and missionary
- Manuel de Santa Cruz (1922–2019), pen-name of Alberto Ruiz de Galarreta Mocoroa, Spanish historian
- Roque González de Santa Cruz (1576–1628), Paraguayan saint

== See also ==
- Cruz
- De la Cruz
- Santa Cruz (disambiguation)
