= Pensions in Chile =

The Chilean pension system (Spanish: Sistema Previsional) provides old-age, disability and survivor pensions for workers in Chile. The system was changed by José Piñera, during Augusto Pinochet's dictatorship, on November 4, 1980, from a PAYGO-system to a fully funded capitalization system run by private sector pension funds. Many critics and supporters see the reform as an important experiment under real conditions, that may give conclusions about the impact of the full conversion of a PAYGO-system to a capital funded system. The development was therefore internationally observed with great interest. Under Michelle Bachelet's government, the system was reformed again.

== Pension system of 1926 ==
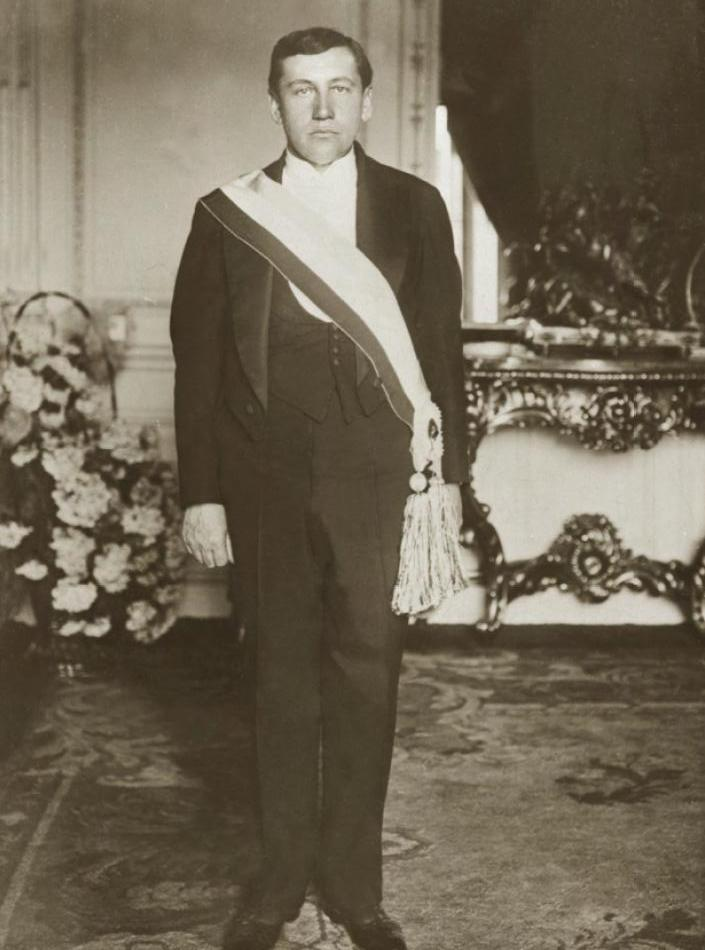
The first pension system of Chile was designed during the first presidency of Arturo Alessandri.

A social security system was introduced in Chile in the 1920s, which included a PAYGO pension system. By 1973 the funding of the pension fund was low, though 73% of all Chilean workers paid into the system. The reason for this was that almost all workers contributed only the statutory minimum contribution, and many successfully evaded pension contributions. The poor payment record is attributed primarily to the fact that individual contributions had little correlation with anticipated pension benefits.

== Pension reform of 1980-81 ==
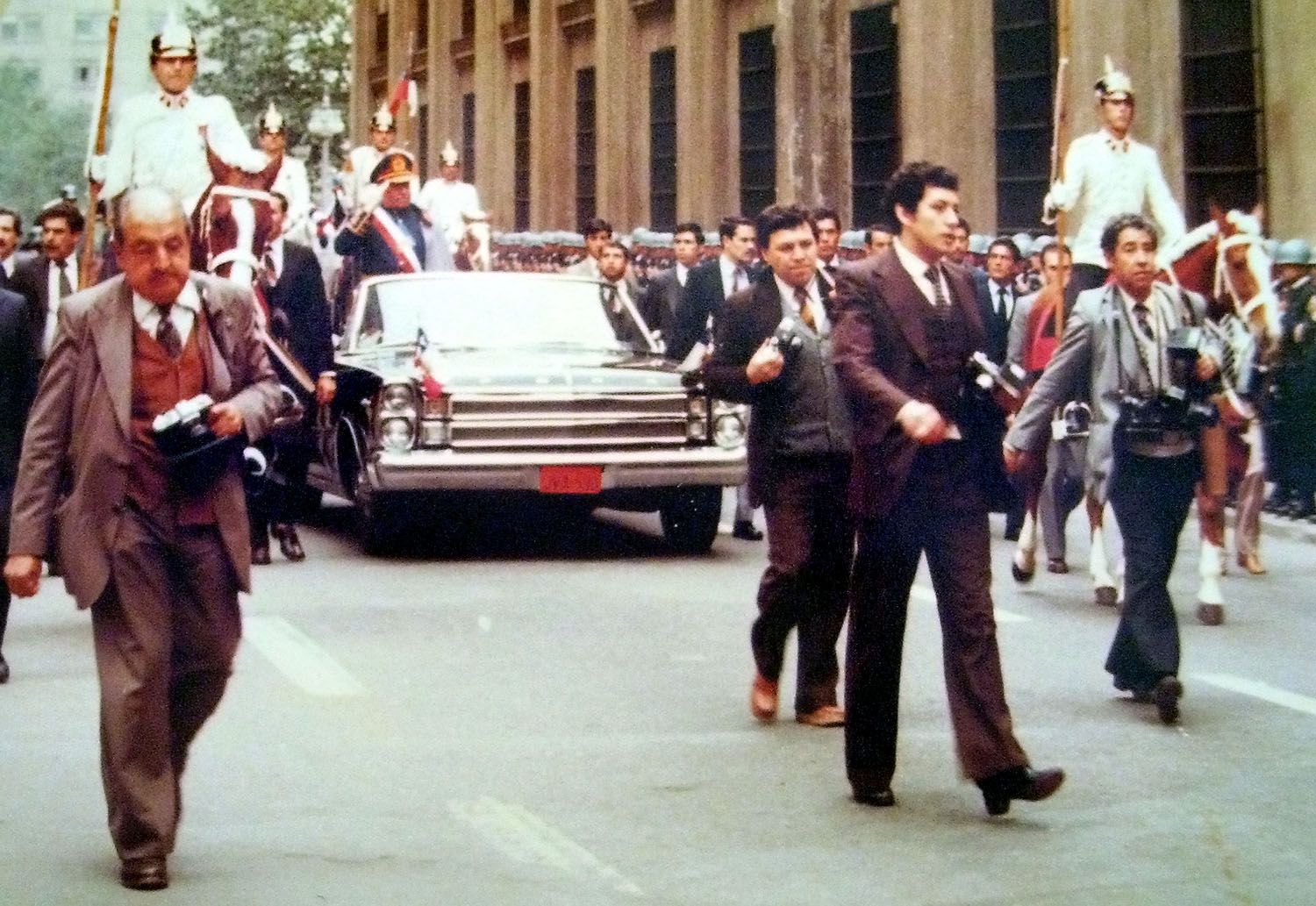
Pinochet in 1982.

On November 4, 1980, under the leadership of José Piñera, Secretary of Labor and Pensions under dictator Augusto Pinochet with the collaboration of his team of Chicago Boys, the PAYGO pension system was changed to a capital funded system run by investment funds. José Piñera had the idea of privatizing the pension system for the first time when reading the book Capitalism and Freedom from Milton Friedman Several (private) pension funds, the so-called Administradoras de Fondos de Pensiones (AFPs), have been implemented.

For all citizens who are legally defined as workers, employers must pay a portion of earnings to a pension fund. Workers who had already paid in the old system got an option to continue to pay into the old system. But the statutory minimum contribution to the new private pension funds was set 11% lower than the contributions to the old pension system; therefore most workers changed to the new pension system.

The members of the Chilean military who implemented the new AFP system excluded themselves from it, keeping their pensions from the Caja de Previsión de la Defensa Nacional. The pensions of the military are substantially higher than those of the rest of Chileans, being most often similar to the income they have during active service. However, differently from what a regular, society-wide, PAYGO system would operate, military pensions go to a small section of the population and are financed by all of the taxpayers in the country.

=== Overview ===
The Chilean workers' yearly contributions in the private pension fund are amounting to about 3.5% of gross domestic product. The pension payments from the pension funds are still relatively low, mainly because few depositors have reached the retirement age. Until 2008 the private pension funds have accumulated capital to an amount of 52.77% of gross domestic product.

Year	2002	2003	2004	2005	2006	2007	2008
Yearly contributions as a % of gross domestic product	3.57	3.40	3.48	3.57	3.32	3.44	3.49
Pensions as a % of gross domestic product	1.95	1.99	1.99	1.78	1.64	0.90	1.92
Capital accumulated as a % of gross domestic product	55.07	58.16	59.08	59.35	61.01	64.43	52.77

==== Government's responsibility ====
The establishment and the operation of the private pension funds are regulated by law. For example, any pension fund must deposit minimum reserves. The types of investments that are permitted are defined by law. The compliance of the private pension funds is supervised by a government regulator, the Superintendencia de AFP, now called Superintendencia de Pensiones.

There are government guarantees for the following cases:

1. All citizens who have contributed to a fund for at least 20 years are guaranteed a minimum pension. The difference between the minimum pension and the pension entitlement from the investment fund is paid by government.
2. If a pension fund is unable to perform a defined minimum profit, it will be liquidated and the collected assets will be transferred to another fund. In this case, the government solves the assets gap.
3. In case of bankruptcy of a pension fund the government pays out the pensions on public expenses.

The government pays a fixed amount as social assistance for those citizens who are not even entitled to minimum pension, the Pensiones Asistenciales (PASIS). But the provided amount of money is usually not nearly big enough to cover all people in need.

Due to the conversion from the PAYGO to the funded system, conversion costs will arise until the year 2045. Contributions are made almost entirely through the new system, there are almost no payments left through the old system. The difference between the remaining contributions and the pensions that have to be paid out has to be financed by the Chilean government. These conversion costs are a big burden for the government budget:

Year	1981	1982	1983	1984	1985	1986	1987	1988	1989	1990	1991	1992	1993	1994	1995
Conversion costs in % of Chilean gross domestic product	4.10	8.30	7.50	7.70	6.70	6.30	5.40	5.20	4.50	4.60	4.50	4.30	4.50	4.50	4.40

==== Contributors ====
All workers and employees must pay into the system. Mandatory contributions amount to 10% of the monthly income, the part of the monthly income that exceeds $2,800 U.S. (60 UF) is non-contributory. Self-employed individuals may contribute voluntarily, and salaried workers can also enhance their pension through additional voluntary contributions. The Chilean armed forces and police do not contribute in the workers pension system but participate in a separate PAYGO system.

The pension contributions are income tax deductible. The worker can choose one of six private pension administrators and change at will and also choose from among five funds (A to E, with A being the riskiest).

==== Administrative costs ====
The pension funds are privately administered. The amount of administrative costs are not regulated by law. However, there is a two-year obligation for a new affiliated to be included in a single fund, selected by public bidding, based on the level of administrative costs. The user contributes to their pension with a contribution of 10% of income. In addition, the user pays administrative costs in the order of 1% from income. The user does not pay any cost while unemployed.

==== Coverage ====
The performance of the Chilean pension funds is not very good compared with the performance of private pension funds of developed countries, but that performance is partly attributed to special factors. The amount of administrative costs was considered a problem of the Chilean pension system but have decreased significantly going from 15% in 1983 to 1,8% in 1993 of accumulated assets.

In addition to or instead of the regular private pension workers may be entitled to state aid:

Retired workers whose private pensions are below a defined level are entitled to minimum pension (Garantía de Pensión Mínima). In this case, the government pays an additional pension.

People who have paid in nothing or contributed less than 20 years may get social assistance, the Pensiones Asistenciales (PASIS). But the Pensiones Asistenciales are paid from a fixed budget that is usually not big enough to cover everyone in need.

The number of workers who actually pay into the pension system decreased from 64% in 1980 (before the reform) to 58% by 2006 According to Patricio Navia an Diego Portales University professor, most people perceive the costs of pensions and the pensions themselves as unfair. Therefore, they try to evade pension contributions.

Andras Uthoff, the director of the Social Development Division of the United Nations Economic Commission for Latin America (ECLAC) states that the reformed Chilean pension system does not work with the reformed Chilean labor market because only a small percentage of workers are able to finance meaningful pensions.

According to the projection of Berstein, Larrain and Pino Rios from the year 2005 (based on data from the period 1981 - 2003) the kind of pensions to expect are predicted as following:

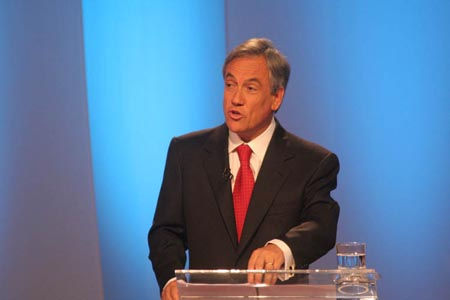
Sebastián Piñera in the presidential debate

60% of all workers are covered	Of those can expect a pension of:		
60% of all workers are covered	social assistance (Pensiones Asistenciales)	minimum pension (Garantía de Pensión Mínima)	sufficient private pension
60% of all workers are covered	40 - 50%	10%	40 - 50%

Sebastián Piñera, the brother of José Piñera and later president of Chile, said during the presidential candidacy in 2006:

Chile's social security system requires deep reforms in all sectors, because half of Chileans have no pension coverage, and of those who do, 40 percent are going to find it hard to reach the minimum level. This has to be confronted now, and we agree with Michelle Bachelet and will, I hope, join forces behind this large undertaking.

— Sebastián Piñera in a televised debate with Michelle Bachelet in 2006

== Pension reform of 2008 ==
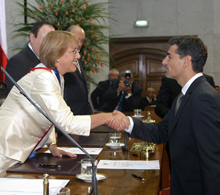
Velasco during the ceremony of assumption as Finance Minister of Chile in March 2006

Under the Bachelet government, the pension system was reformed again in the year 2008. Andrés Velasco, the leading economic adviser to the government, addressed the two main problems as the coverage of the population and the amount of the administrative costs. Too many people are outside the pension system, and capital accumulation by using the pension funds is quite expensive The reform follows a recommendation by the World Bank, who has found in the 1980 pension system a strong redistributive component at the expense of low paid or occasionally unemployed workers. A big part of the Chilean population is not able to finance meaningful pensions, because many workers are not able to regularly contribute a higher amount of money. Additionally many workers have difficulties to achieve the 20 years of contributions to at least qualify for minimum pension. Since the pension funds charge high fixed administrative costs per insured person and only a small portion of the administrative costs depend on the amount of the capital account, capital accumulation by pension funds is very unprofitable for workers with lower incomes. The World Bank therefore recommended that the minimum pension and the Pensiones Asistenciales should be abolished and instead introduced a public risk pooling device financed by VAT tax revenue.

The reform includes mainly the following points:

- The minimum pension and the Pensiones Asistenciales were replaced by a tax-funded solidary pension system (SPS). All citizens older than 65 years, that lived in Chile for at least 20 years and do not have a private pension on a defined minimum level qualify for an SPS pension.
- The legally defined framework within which pension fund investments are allowed has been extended.
- Within a transitional period lasting until 2015, self-employed individuals are also to be integrated into the pension system.

== See also ==
- Chile under Pinochet
- Economy of Chile
- Chicago Boys
- Welfare reform

== Bibliography ==
- Tapen Sinha (2000), Pension Reform in Latin America and its Lessons for International Policymakers (in German), Kluwer Academic Publishers, ISBN 0-7923-7882-2
- Guillermo Larrain Rois (2005), Enhancing the Success of the Chilean Pension System in: A Quarter Century of Pension Reform in Latin America and the Caribbean (in German), Inter American Development Bank, ISBN 1-59782-020-2
- Monica Townson (2001), Pensions Under Attack (in German), Canadian Centre for Policy Alternatives, ISBN 1-55028-694-3
