= José Piñera Carvallo =

Chilean engineer, diplomat and politician

Manuel José Piñera Carvallo (22 September 1917 – 3 June 1991) was a Chilean engineer, diplomat, and Christian Democratic politician.

== Early life ==
Piñera Carvallo was the son of lawyer José Manuel Piñera Figueroa and Elena Carvallo Castillo. His great-grandfather, José Piñera Lombera, a native of Lima, Peru, but from Asturias, arrived in La Serena in 1827, being the first Piñera to arrive in Chile.

José Piñera Carvallo lived in Paris, France, where he received a secular education in conjunction with his siblings Bernardino (doctor and bishop), Paulette and Marie Louise. At 17, he returned to Chile, studying at the Padres Franceses school in the capital and then in the School of Engineering at the Catholic University of Chile.

== Personal life ==
While still young he married Magdalena Echenique Rozas, daughter of José Miguel Echenique Correa and Josefa Rozas Ariztía. Carvallo's mother was the granddaughter of the aristocratic Luisa Pinto Garmendia, daughter of President Francisco Antonio Pinto, sister of President Aníbal Pinto and sister in law of President Manuel Bulnes.

With Magdalena Carvallo had six children: Guadalupe, José, Sebastián, Pablo, Miguel, and Magdalena. He separated from his wife in 1975. He died of pulmonary emphysema in 1991 in Santiago.

== Political career ==
In university Piñera Carvallo joined the National Falange, the germ of the Christian Democratic Party, of which he was a founding member. He was founder and first president of the Federation of Catholic University Students (FEUC).

In 1954 he joined the state Production Development Corporation (CORFO), where he worked virtually his entire life.

During the government of President Eduardo Frei Montalva, he was appointed ambassador, first to Belgium and then to the UN in the United States. As representative in Brussels he participated in the management of Chile's external debt, working closely with another diplomat, Gabriel Valdes.

== Recognition ==
In 1967, Piñera Carvallo received the Grand Cross of the Order of Isabella the Catholic (Spain).

Diplomatic posts
Preceded by Daniel Schweitzer	Permanent Representative of Chile to the United Nations; 1966 – 1970	Succeeded by Humberto Diaz Casanueva
