= Wan Waithayakon =

Thai prince and diplomat (1891–1976)

Wan Waithayakon วรรณไวทยากร
- Prince Naradhip Bongsaprabandha
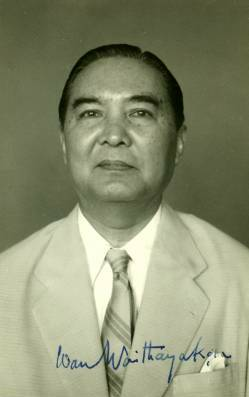
- Waithayakon in the 1940s
- Born: 25 August 1891; Bangkok, Siam
- Died: 5 September 1976 (aged 85); Bangkok, Thailand
- Spouse: Princess Bibulaya Benchang Kitiyakara
- Issue: 2
- House: Vorawan
- Dynasty: Chakri
- Father: Prince Voravanakara, Prince of Naradhip Prapanpongse
- Mother: Tuansri Voravan Na Ayudhya

President of the United Nations General Assembly
- In office 1956–1957
- Preceded by: Rudecindo Ortega
- Succeeded by: Leslie Munro

Minister of Foreign Affairs
- In office 28 March 1952 – 20 October 1958
- Prime Minister: Plaek Phibunsongkhram; Pote Sarasin; Thanom Kittikachorn
- Preceded by: Warakan Bancha
- Succeeded by: Thanat Khoman

Deputy Prime Minister of Thailand
- In office 1 January 1958 – 20 October 1958
- Prime Minister: Thanom Kittikachorn
- In office 9 February 1959 – 8 December 1963
- Prime Minister: Sarit Thanarat
- In office 9 December 1963 – 9 December 1969
- Prime Minister: Thanom Kittikachorn

Rector of Thammasat University
- In office 19 December 1963 – 31 March 1971
- Preceded by: Thanom Kittikachorn
- Succeeded by: Sanya Dharmasakti

Prince Varna Vaidayakara (Note: Thai: วรรณไวทยากร, RTGS: Wan Waithayakon, Thai pronunciation: [wān wāj.tʰá.jāː.kɔ̄ːn]) (full title: His Royal Highness Prince Varna Vaidayakara, the Prince Naradhip Bongsaprabandha), known in the West as Wan Waithayakon (1891–1976), was a Thai royal prince and diplomat. He was President of the Eleventh Session of the United Nations General Assembly (1956–1957) while serving as Thailand's Permanent Representative to the United Nations. He was a grandson of King Mongkut (Rama IV).

== Early life and education ==
Prince Wan was born on 25 August 1891 in Bangkok. He began his education at Suan Kularb School and Rajvidyalai (King's College) before continuing his education in England, where he earned a degree with honours in History from Balliol College, Oxford . Wan also attended the Ecole Libre des Sciences Politiques (better known as Sciences Po), in Paris.

== Career ==
Prince Wan began his career as a foreign service officer in 1917. He was appointed advisor to his cousin, King Vajiravudh, in 1922. In 1924, he was promoted to the rank of under-secretary for foreign affairs and was responsible for negotiating several important amendments to political and commercial treaties with Western powers.

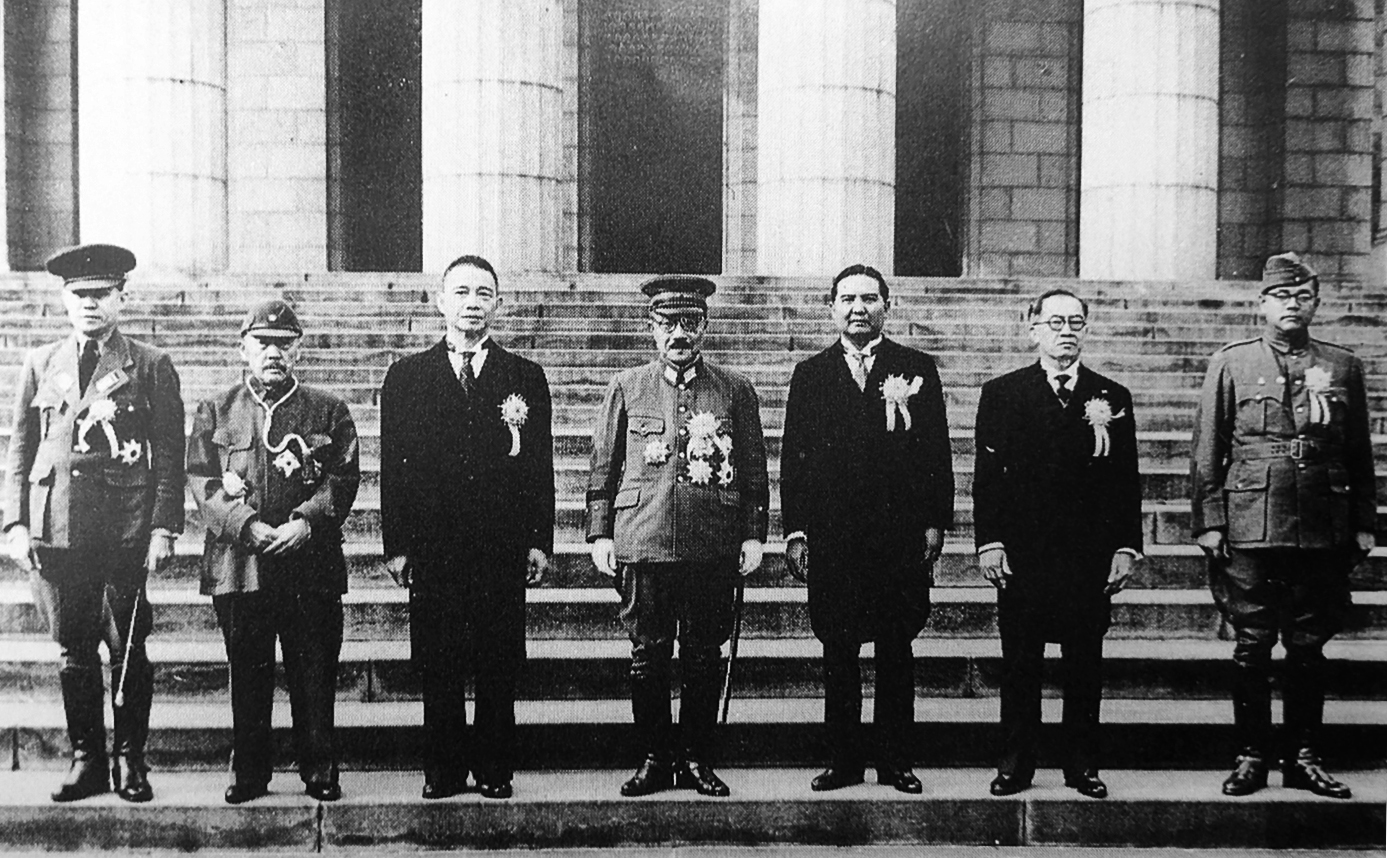
Greater East Asia Conference, November 1943; the participants were (left to right): Prime Minister of Burma Ba Maw, Prime Minister of Manchukuo Zhang Jinghui, President of China (Nanjing) Wang Jingwei, Prime Minister of Japan Hideki Tojo, Wan Waithayakon, President of the Philippines José P. Laurel, and head of Free India Subhas Chandra Bose

He was sent to Europe again in 1926 as the minister accredited to the United Kingdom, the Netherlands, and Belgium. During that period, he also served as head of the Thai delegation to the League of Nations, where he was active in a number of important commissions as member, vice-president, and president. Prince Wan returned to Thailand in 1930, to accept a professorial chair at the Faculty of Arts, Chulalongkorn University.

For the next 30 years, Prince Wan continued to serve his country in a number of important diplomatic missions, some of the notable milestones being negotiations with Japan in 1943 during World War II; represented Thailand at the Greater East Asia Conference; participated in the SEATO Council and the Bandung Conference, where he was elected rapporteur; and negotiations leading to Thailand's admission to the United Nations.

In 1947, Prince Wan was appointed ambassador to the United States and served concurrently as ambassador to the United Nations. In 1956, he was the president of the Eleventh Session of the United Nations' General Assembly. He also served as Thailand's foreign minister from 1952 to 1957 and again in 1958.

== Language ==
Prince Wan's expertise in languages ranged from English and Pali to Sanskrit. He coined Thai words from English that are in use today. They include prachathipatai (democracy), ratthathammanoon (constitution), thanakarn (bank), and songkram (war). His proficiency in languages led to his being made president of the Royal Society of Thailand, the national arbiter of the Thai language. Prince Wan won many academic honours and is regarded as one of the founding fathers of philological textual criticism in Thailand.

== Death ==
Prince Wan died on 5 September 1976, aged 85.

== Honors ==
=== Thailand ===
- The Most Illustrious Order of the Royal House of Chakri
- Knight Grand Cross of the Most Illustrious Order of Chula Chom Klao
- Knight Grand Cordon of the Most Exalted Order of the White Elephant
- Knight Grand Cordon of the Most Noble Order of the Crown of Thailand
- Safeguarding the Constitution Medal
- Dushdi Mala Medal Civilian, Service to the Nation
- Dushdi Mala Medal Civilian, arts and sciences
- Medal for Service Rendered in the Interior (Indochina)
- Border Service Medal
- Chakrabarti Mala Medal
- The Boy Scout Citation Medal, First Class
- King Prajadhipok's Royal Cypher Medal, Third class
- King Ananda Mahidol's Royal Cypher Medal, First class
- King Bhumibol Adulyadej's Royal Cypher Medal, First class

=== Foreign ===
- Japan :
  - Grand Cordon of the Order of the Sacred Treasure (1925)
  - Grand Cordon of the Order of the Rising Sun (1939)
- Denmark :
  - Grand Cross of the Order of the Dannebrog (1926)
- Kingdom of Spain :
  - Knight Grand Cross of the Order of Isabella the Catholic (1927)
- Kingdom of Italy :
  - Knight Grand Cross of the Order of the Crown of Italy (1927)
- Norway :
  - Grand Cross of the Royal Norwegian Order of Saint Olav (1927)
- Belgium :
  - Grand Cross of the Order of the Crown (1927)
  - Grand Cross of the Order of Leopold (1939)
- Portugal :
  - Grand Cross of the Military Order of Christ (1928)
- Nazi Germany :
  - Grand Cross of the Order of the German Eagle (1938)
- France :
  - Grand Cross of the Legion of Honour (1940)
- Taiwan :
  - Special Grand Cordon of the Order of Brilliant Star (1949)
- Spain :
  - Grand Cross Star of the Order of Civil Merit (1953)
- Cambodia :
  - Knight Grand Cross of the Royal Order of Cambodia (1955)
- Kingdom of Laos :
  - Grand Cross of the Order of the Million Elephants and the White Parasol (1955)
- Burma :
  - Grand Commander of the Order of the Union of Burma (1956)
- Kingdom of Greece :
  - Grand Cross of the Order of the Phoenix (1956)
- Cuba :
  - Grand Cross of the Order of Carlos Manuel de Cespedes (1957)
- South Vietnam :
  - Grand Cross of the National Order of Vietnam (1957)
- USA :
  - Commander of the Legion of Merit (1958)
- Argentina :
  - Grand Cross of the Order of the Liberator General San Martín (1962)
- Federal Republic of Germany :
  - Grand Cross 1st Class, Special Issue of the Order of Merit of the Federal Republic of Germany (1963)
- Netherlands :
  - Grand Cross of the Order of Orange-Nassau (1967)
- Malaysia :
  - Honorary Grand Commander of the Order of the Defender of the Realm (1964)
- Austria :
  - Grand Star of the Decoration of Honour for Services to the Republic of Austria (1967)
- Peru :
  - Grand Cross of the Order of the Sun of Peru
- Philippines :
  - Grand Cross of the Order of Sikatuna

=== Academic rank ===
- Professor of Chulalongkorn University

== Notes ==
Diplomatic posts
Preceded by Rudecindo Ortega	President of the United Nations General Assembly; 1956–1957	Succeeded by Leslie Munro
