= Humberto Díaz Casanueva =

Chilean poet, diplomat and educator

Humberto Díaz Casanueva (1906–1992) was a Chilean poet, diplomat, and educator. He won the Chilean National Prize for Literature in 1971. He was appointed by President Salvador Allende as Permanent Representative of Chile to the United Nations, serving from 1970 until the 1973 coup d'état.

Diplomatic posts
Preceded by José Piñera Carvallo	Permanent Representative of Chile to the United Nations; 1970 – 1973	Succeeded by Ismael Huerta
