= Sergio Romero Pizarro =

Chilean politician

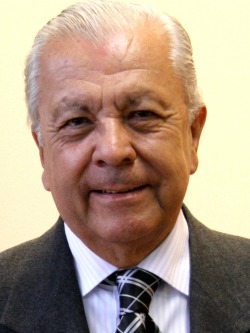

Ambassador of Chile in Italy
- In office 19 January 2019 – 11 March 2022
- Preceded by: Fernando Ayala González

Ambassador of Chile in Spain and Andorra
- In office 6 July 2010 – 11 March 2014
- Preceded by: Gonzalo Martner
- Succeeded by: Francisco Marambio

President of the Senate of Chile
- In office 11 March 2005 – 11 March 2006
- Preceded by: Hernán Larraín
- Succeeded by: Eduardo Frei Ruíz-Tagle
- In office 12 March 1997 – 11 March 1998
- Preceded by: Sergio Diez
- Succeeded by: Andrés Zaldívar

Member of the Senate of Chile
- In office 11 March 1990 – 11 March 2010
- Preceded by: Creation of the Circunscription
- Succeeded by: Francisco Chahuán
- Constituency: 5th Circunscription (Valparaíso Cordillera)

Undersecretary of Agriculture
- In office 12 July 1976 – 11 March 1977
- Appointed by: Augusto Pinochet
- Preceded by: Carlos Rodríguez Papic
- Succeeded by: José Luis Toro Hevia

Personal details
- Born: 8 December 1938 (age 87) Santiago, Chile
- Party: Renovación Nacional (1989–present)
- Spouse: Bernardita Guzmán Valdés
- Children: 5
- Education: Pontifical Catholic University of Chile (LL.B)
- Occupation: Politician
- Profession: Lawyer

Sergio Romero Pizarro (born 8 December 1938) is a Chilean politician who has served as a parliamentary and ambassador of his country.

He served as a Senator for the Valparaíso Cordillera constituency for three consecutive terms between 1990 and 2010, including two terms as President of the Senate (1997–1998 and 2005–2006). He later served as Ambassador to Spain (2010–2014) and Italy (2019–2021).

== Early life and education ==
Romero was born in Buin on 8 December 1938. He is the son of Bernardo Romero Pozo and María Luisa Pizarro Cassoulet. He married Bernardita Guzmán Valdés on 17 March 1967, and they have five children: Juan José, Luis Felipe, Sergio Andrés, Diego, and Bernardita. He has seventeen grandchildren.

He completed his early education at the Liceo Parroquial de Buin (later Liceo Moderno de Buin) and his secondary education at the Instituto Miguel León Prado and the Colegio Hispano Americano (Escolapios). He later studied law at the Pontifical Catholic University of Chile, where his undergraduate thesis focused on agricultural insurance. He completed his judicial internship in Buin alongside Ricardo Lagos and qualified as a lawyer in January 1965, graduating with distinction before the Supreme Court of Chile.

== Professional and business career ==
Romero began practicing law in 1965 and became head of the Legal Department of the National Society of Agriculture (SNA) in 1966, where he had previously served as a legal clerk. He was appointed Secretary General of the SNA from 1966 to 1976, later becoming president of Radio Agricultura from 1978 and founding Radio San Cristóbal FM, later renamed Radio Agricultura FM. He also served as a director of the Chilean Association of Broadcasters.

He was founder and president of the Feria Internacional de Santiago (FISA) from 1978, representing the SNA. Within the SNA, he served as counselor, board member, and first vice president between 1987 and 1989. During the same period, he was elected vice president of the Confederation of Production and Commerce (CPC), resigning to run as an independent candidate for the Senate in 1989.

Romero was also active in business leadership, serving as a director of ICARE (1973–1976), INDUS (1977–1983), DINAC S.A. (1975–1976), and Banco de Concepción (1987–1989). In 1978, he co-founded the management consulting firm INECON, and in 1980 helped create Microsystem S.A. and DICOM, later acquired by Equifax. He also served as a member of the Rural Council of the International Labour Organization (ILO) and participated in several ILO assemblies in Geneva.

== Political career ==
Romero became politically active during his university years as a member of the Conservative Party, serving as a member of its General Council and as president of its youth wing. He held multiple student leadership positions at the Pontifical Catholic University of Chile, including president of the Law School Student Council and delegate to the FEUC and national student federations.

Between 1976 and 1977, he served as Undersecretary of Agriculture, where he contributed to the creation of the National Irrigation Commission and the implementation of agricultural price bands. Through INDAP, he promoted technical assistance programs for small agricultural producers, particularly former beneficiaries of agrarian reform programs.

Romero was elected senator as an independent candidate for the Valparaíso Cordillera constituency and assumed office in 1990. He joined National Renewal (RN) in March 1990 and served multiple terms as head of the RN Senate caucus during his three consecutive senatorial terms (1990–2010). He also served as vice president of RN and as a member of its National Political Commission.

He served as President of the Senate during the 1997–1998 and 2005–2006 legislative periods.

== Diplomatic and later activities ==
In June 2010, President Sebastián Piñera appointed Romero Ambassador of Chile to Spain, a position he held until 2014. He also served concurrently as ambassador to Andorra. From January 2019 to 2021, he served as Ambassador of Chile to Italy, with concurrent accreditation to Malta, San Marino, and Chile's permanent missions to UN agencies in Rome, including the FAO.

In August 2023, Romero resigned from National Renewal in anticipation of his appointment to the Election Qualification Court (TRICEL). He served as a member of that court between 2023 and 2024.

He has also served as an advisor to the UC Center for International Studies, president of the Foreign Relations Commission of the Instituto Libertad, and as a member of the honorary advisory committee of the Union of Latin American Parties (UPLA).
