= Pendulum arbitration =

Form of interest arbitration

Pendulum arbitration, otherwise known as final offer arbitration (or "FOA") or baseball arbitration, is a type of interest arbitration in which the arbitrator chooses one of the parties' proposals on each (or perhaps all) disputed issues. For example, in the case of labor collective bargaining, a trade union may demand a wage increase of 7% and the management may offer 3%. The arbitrator's decision has to choose between awarding a 3% or a 7% increase. This procedure is opposed to conventional interest arbitration, in which the parties present evidence and the arbitrator acts as fact-finder and crafts an award. In disputes over labor contracts, this dispute resolution procedure is known to be a common type of contract arbitration. Perhaps the most well-known instance is salary arbitration in Major League Baseball, where a certain class of players may elect to arbitrate their salary instead of accepting their team's salary offer. Final-offer arbitration is widely used to determine public union contracts in the United States, either as a substitute for collective bargaining or as a mechanism to determine the contract when bargaining has failed.

A primary purpose and effect of FOA is to encourage the parties to arrive at a settlement. Parties who fail to compromise during negotiations risk a total loss on some or all arbitrated issues under FOA. This uncertainty is considered a "cost" of arbitration that the parties can avoid by settling. By contrast, in conventional arbitration, parties are more likely to call on the arbitrator to decide disputed issues, giving the arbitrator the power to craft a "reasonable" award. In addition to promoting settlement, use of FOA leads parties to adopt reasonable positions during the arbitration, because an unreasonable position will almost certainly be rejected in favor of a more reasonable competing proposal.

FOA was first suggested in the 1960s by the labor relations scholar Carl Stevens as a strategy for driving parties to agreement. Conventional arbitration was already in frequent use as an alternative to strikes for resolving disagreements between management and labor. But research showed that parties were remaining far apart in the expectation that the arbitrator would simply split the difference between them. In that case, the more unreasonable your offer, the better you fared. Thus many people questioned the wisdom of arbitration. Stevens created final-offer arbitration to address the problem and to encourage negotiators to solve disputes on their own.

== Pendulum arbitration outside the U.S. ==
Chile's Secretary of Labor and Social Security José Piñera pioneered the introduction in a national law utilizing this mechanism. In fact, Chile's 1979 Labor Reform mandates pendulum arbitration for special collective bargaining cases. The Chilean law also required the parties to pay the full cost of the arbitrator, another incentive to try to avoid the arbitration and reach bilateral agreements. The law created a register of private arbitrators (economists and lawyers with a solid reputation for expertise and fairness), some or all of whom the parties shall agree to select, to decide conclusively the terms of the contract. There is consensus among experts that this system in Chile has proved very successful, and it has not been disturbed by subsequent governments.

Australia will use final offer arbitration to settle disagreements between news publishers and digital platforms in determining compensation for the use of news.
