= Hernán Santa Cruz =

Chilean lawyer and diplomat (1906–1999)

- Hernan Santa Cruz in 1966

2nd Permanent Representative of Chile to the United Nations
- In office 1946 – 1953
- President: Gabriel González Videla (1946–1952); Carlos Ibáñez del Campo (1953)
- Preceded by: Gabriel González Videla
- Succeeded by: Rudecindo Ortega Masson (es)

Personal details
- Born: 1906
- Died: 1999 (aged 92–93) Santiago, Chile
- Children: Rodrigo Santa Cruz (son)
- Occupation: United Nations delegate and administrator, judge, lawyer

Hernán Santa Cruz Barceló (Note: In this Chilean name, the first or paternal surname is Santa Cruz and the second or maternal family name is Barceló.) (February 8, 1906 – February 10, 1999) was a Chilean lawyer and diplomat, Chile's first delegate to the United Nations and one of the nine original drafters of the Universal Declaration of Human Rights.

According to the United Nations, in addition to his work on the Declaration, Santa Cruz was "active in the establishment of the Economic Commission for Latin America and the Caribbean" (ECLAC).

In honor of his work creating ECLAC and his work in drafting the Universal Declaration of Human Rights, the library in the ECLAC building in Santiago is named after him.

== Biography ==
Hernán Santa Cruz Barceló was born in Santiago as the son and grandson of a prominent family in the Chilean public sphere. His father was Joaquín Santa Cruz Ossa, lawyer and official of the Chilean Ministry of Foreign Affairs, as well as mayor of the Ñuñoa commune in the city of Santiago. His paternal grandfather, Joaquín Santa Cruz Vargas, was a senator for the Radical Party. His maternal grandfather was José María Barceló, who was a senator for Valparaíso, Minister of Justice (between 1873 and 1876), dean of the Faculty of Law of the University of Chile and president of the Supreme Court (1893). The Penal Code promulgated on November 12, 1874, and in force until today bears the signature of Minister Barceló.

As he relates in his memoirs, during his youth he felt very attracted to the texts of the French Revolution, the Russian Revolution and learning about what was happening in Europe between the wars. From the beginning he had an inclination for international politics, which would be very useful in the future (Human Rights Yearbook of the University of Chile 2021).

As former President Patricio Aylwin recalls, in a tribute held at ECLAC in 2000, "at the age of 17, when he was just beginning his law studies, (Hernán Santa Cruz) began working as secretary in the War Audit Office of Santiago, beginning a brilliant forensic career in the field of Military Justice, which in just over two decades would lead him to be Minister of the Court Martial of Santiago and, at the same time, professor at the Higher Institute of Carabineros." The late President also indicated that "from memories that I preserve of comments that at that time I heard from my father, then Minister of the Court of Appeals of Santiago, Don Hernán enjoyed great prestige in the forum for his intelligence, conversation, chivalry and sympathy".

In 1929 he married Adriana García de la Huerta Balmaceda, with whom he had five children: Iván, Cristián, Regina, Rodrigo and Adriana.

== Beginnings in politics ==
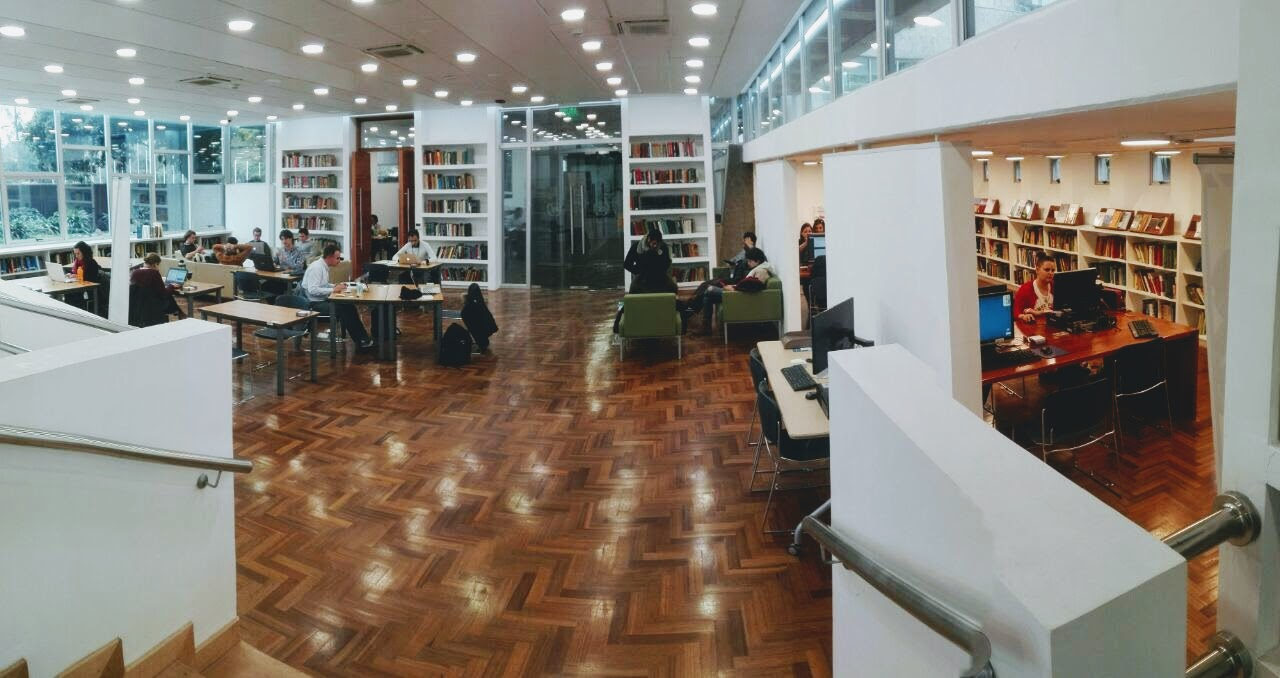
Interior of the Hernán Santa Cruz Library in 2017

At the end of the 1930s, he became friends with the then Minister of Health Salvador Allende. Both were even neighbors in the same building on Victoria Subercaseaux Street, in the center of Santiago. These apartments became informal venues for meetings with Peruvian and Venezuelan exiles, who discussed the need to unite Latin America.

Senator Isabel Allende, daughter of the late President Salvador Allende, paid tribute in Congress in 1999, in which she indicated that "as time progresses, there are few opportunities in which we can encounter such noble examples, of the best of our democratic tradition. In fact, when we remember the career of Hernán Santa Cruz Barceló, we will see, without a doubt, one of the best expressions of our republican history, one that laid the foundations of an uninterrupted democracy for more than four decades, of that tradition that filled us of pride in the face of the vicissitudes and complexities of a convulsed world."

Senator Allende also said that it was his vocation for public service, as well as the political networks he had built, that led President Gabriel González Videla to appoint him in 1947 as Chile's ambassador to the newly created United Nations. During González Videla's presidential campaign, Hernán Santa Cruz was in charge of international affairs.

== Diplomatic career ==
Patricio Aylwin recalled, regarding his appointment as Chile's ambassador to the United Nations, that "President González Videla, who had just assumed his government, had the happy intuition to entrust him with such a delicate and important task, which with the rank of Ambassador he carried out throughout that presidential period, until November 1952." Aylwin added that "years later, in June 1967, President Frei Montalva appointed him Ambassador and Permanent Representative of Chile to the United Nations and other international organizations based in Geneva and Rome, a mission he maintained under the government of President Salvador Allende, until September 11, 1973."

Thus, there were a total of 12 years that Hernán Santa Cruz represented Chile before the UN. The late Christian Democratic president recounted in detail the importance that the Chilean diplomat had in the International Forum: “In the first of those two periods, Santa Cruz was not only an active and effective representative of our country in the World Forum, but he also chaired its Economic and Social Council and was a member of the Security Council, but he was also a member of the Drafting Committee of the Declaration of Human Rights and was the author of such transcendental initiatives, such as the creation of the Economic Commission for Latin America (ECLAC), which he proposed in July 1947, and whose approval was achieved, after intense debate, in February 1949." In his honor, since 2008 the ECLAC library has been named after him.

When Hernán Santa Cruz was appointed Chile's first ambassador to the United Nations in 1946, the Organization had only 51 member states, of which 20 were from Latin America. Santa Cruz's proactivity, experience and youth allowed him to play a very prominent role in the United Nations with the support of his colleagues in the region.

Regarding the Universal Declaration of Human Rights, Hernán Santa Cruz was a strong promoter of enshrining economic, social and cultural rights. In the words of the former Executive Secretary of ECLAC and later Foreign Secretary of Mexico, Alicia Bárcena, “As noted by Mary Anne Glendon[1], professor at Harvard Law School, who defined Hernán Santa Cruz as one of the most influential drafters of the Universal Declaration and as "the most zealous promoter of the new social, economic and cultural rights. She described the author as “Hernán Santa Cruz, from Chile, a passionate left-wing man who helped ensure that social and economic rights had the prominent place in the Declaration they deserve alongside traditional political and civil liberties" Due to this, in 2020 the United Nations High Commissioner for Human Rights launched the Hernán Santa Cruz Dialogues on Economic, Social and Cultural Rights, confirming that he had been its main promoter.

Aylwin added that Santa Cruz also "proposed the institutionalization of a Technical Assistance Program for Economic Development, which the General Assembly approved in December 1948, and which marked the first beginning of the current United Nations Development Programme". Always in the field of economic development, he was the promoter and head of the Chilean delegation, with the rank of Minister of State, to the Third United Nations Conference on Trade and Development (UNCTAD III) in Santiago in 1972.

Furthermore, he played a crucial role in the first commissions that studied the problem of racial discrimination and human rights violations in South Africa and Namibia, being the first Human Rights Rapporteur for the racial situation in South Africa and president of the respective commission (1953–1955). This was the first time that the United Nations intervened in the problem of Apartheid. He also "was a member of the Subcommission on Prevention of Discrimination and Protection of Minorities. He was re-elected six times between 1954 and 1974 and held the presidency of said Subcommittee on two occasions, in 1964 and 1965. (Deputy Edgardo Riveros in Tribute of the Chamber of Deputies.

His role was not limited to human rights, economic development and combating racial discrimination, but in the field of Food and Agriculture “he chaired, in 1966, the first World Conference on Agrarian Reform and, of course, he was one of the main people responsible for the first World Campaign against Hunger" (I. Allende). In addition, he was Deputy Director General and Regional Representative for Latin America of the Food and Agriculture Organization of the United Nations (FAO) between 1959 and 1967 and chaired the World Conference on Agrarian Reform and Rural Development (1979). The auditorium of the FAO regional headquarters for Latin America and the Caribbean in Santiago is named after him.

In 1973 he resigned as Ambassador, but continued to be linked to international politics, participating in international bodies and in his native Chile. Thus, he remained in Europe and served as the president of the International Center for Development, based in Paris, and he later assumed the presidency of the International Studies Circle of the Academy of Christian Humanism, and as a full member of the Academy of Social, Political, and Moral Sciences at the Institute of Chile since 1986. In 1996, President Eduardo Frei Ruiz-Tagle conferred on him the highest national honor, the Decoration for Meritorious Services to the Republic, for services rendered to the country.

Hernán Santa Cruz captured his international experience in the three volumes of his memoirs, titled "Cooperate or Perish, the Dilemma of the World Community."

== Death ==
He died in Santiago, Chile, on February 10, 1999, at the age of 93.

== Tribute to Hernán Santa Cruz at the Ministry of Foreign Affairs ==
On August 9, 2023, the Minister of Foreign Affairs of Chile, Alberto van Klaveren, inaugurated the eighth Hernán Santa Cruz Dialogue, an initiative led by the Office of the United Nations High Commissioner for Human Rights since 2020, with the aim to promote the exchange of ideas and experiences regarding economic, social, cultural and environmental rights.

At the event, a tribute was paid to Hernán Santa Cruz, on which occasion the chancellor noted that the Chilean diplomat "left an indelible mark on the origins of modern multilateralism and international human rights law, laying the foundations for the principles that have inspired Chile's foreign policy to this day".
