= Pedro Daza =

Chilean politician

Ambassador of Chile at the Organization of American States
- In office 1984 – 11 March 1990
- President: Augusto Pinochet

Ambassador of Chile at the United Nations
- In office 1984 – 11 March 1990
- President: Augusto Pinochet
- Preceded by: Manuel Trucco Gaete
- Succeeded by: Juan Somavía

Ambassador of Chile to Switzerland
- In office 1979–1982
- President: Augusto Pinochet
- Preceded by: Juan Germán Hutt
- Succeeded by: Carlos Forestier

Ambassador of Chile to the United Nations
- In office 1977–1979
- President: Augusto Pinochet
- Preceded by: Ricardo Lira Gómez
- Succeeded by: Dissolution of the position

Ambassador of Chile to Venezuela
- In office 1974–1975
- President: Augusto Pinochet
- Preceded by: Guillermo Fuentes Besoaín
- Succeeded by: Alberto Besa Allan

Undersecretary of Foreign Affairs of Chile
- In office 1962–1964
- President: Jorge Alessandri
- Preceded by: Fernando Donoso Silva
- Succeeded by: Enrique Bernstein

Personal details
- Born: 4 February 1925 Santiago, Chile
- Died: 8 October 2005 (aged 80) Santiago, Chile
- Party: Radical Party; Renovación Nacional (1987–2005)
- Children: Five (among them, Paula)
- Education: University of Chile (LL.B); University of the Republic (MA)
- Occupation: Politician
- Profession: Lawyer

Pedro Daza Valenzuela (4 March 1925 – 8 October 2005) was a Chilean lawyer and politician. He served as ambassador to several countries and as Chile’s representative to major international organizations, including the Organization of American States and the United Nations.

== Early life and education ==
Daza Valenzuela was born in Santiago on 4 March 1925. He studied law at the University of Chile and later earned a doctorate in Law and Social Sciences from the Republic of Uruguay.

== Diplomatic career ==
He entered the Ministry of Foreign Affairs in 1945, beginning a long diplomatic career. In 1962, during the government of President Jorge Alessandri, he served as Undersecretary of Foreign Affairs. In that role, he dealt with major challenges including Bolivia’s severance of diplomatic relations with Chile, regional integration efforts in Latin America, and the restructuring of the Ministry of Foreign Affairs.

Daza served as Chilean ambassador to several countries, including Venezuela, Bolivia, and Uruguay. He also represented Chile before the Organization of American States and the United Nations. During the military dictatorship of General Augusto Pinochet, he served as ambassador in Geneva, Argentina, Venezuela, and Bolivia.

=== Abrazo de Charaña ===
Daza Valenzuela was one of the figures involved in the diplomatic initiative known as the Abrazo de Charaña, which brought together Bolivian President Hugo Banzer and Chilean ruler Augusto Pinochet. The initiative marked the beginning of negotiations aimed at providing Bolivia with sovereign access to the Pacific Ocean. The negotiations ultimately failed due to opposition from Peru.

Following the failure of the talks, Bolivia severed diplomatic relations with Chile in 1978. Since then, relations between the two countries have remained at the consular level only.

== Political activity ==
In addition to his diplomatic career, Daza was involved in political activity. He served as vice president of the centre-right party National Renewal and was ambassador to the Latin American Free Trade Association during the presidencies of Jorge Alessandri, Eduardo Frei Montalva, and Salvador Allende.

== Personal life ==
He was married to Carmen Narbona, with whom he had five children.

== Death ==
Pedro Daza Valenzuela died in 2005 at the age of 80, as a result of a pulmonary infection.
