= Transparente (album) =

Studio album by Mariza
- Released: 25 April 2005
- Genre: Fado, World Music
- Length: 41:25
- Label: World Connection, EMI Music
- Producer: Jaques Morelenbaum

Mariza chronology
Fado Curvo (2003)	Transparente (2005)	Concerto em Lisboa (2006)

Singles from Transparente
- 1. "Meu Fado Meu"

Transparente is the third studio album by Portuguese fado singer Mariza, released on 25 April 2005 by EMI Music Portugal. It was recorded in Brazil and produced by Brazilian musician Jaques Morelenbaum.

== Background and development ==
Transparente was recorded in Rio de Janeiro, Brazil, under the direction of Brazilian cellist, arranger and Grammy-winning music producer Jaques Morelenbaum. Mariza has claimed to be a long time fan of Morelenbaum's work, and wished to create at least a song with him.

When invited by Mariza to arrange her new album, Morelenbaum could not recuse himself, stating that despite fado being a foreign genre to him, it reminded him "that Brazil is steeped in Portuguese culture".

== Composition ==
For Transparente, Mariza once again chose to feature both original songs and adaptations to traditional fados, a practice she follows since the release of her first studio album, Fado em Mim. The song "Malmequer" is an adaptation by Aldina Duarte to the traditional Fado Menor, whereas "Toada do desengano" is a work by Vasco Graça Moura based on Fado Franklin. Mário Raínho also contributed with his "Recusa", having developed the song from Fado Magala. The singer has stated that since she does not know how to write songs, she feels the need "to resort to the great poets and ask for help from composers and singer-songwriters" when working on new projects. This album follows this trend, once again featuring content by Fernando Pessoa, Florbela Espanca and Artur Ribeiro.

The album's homonymous song "Transparente" was written for Mariza by poet Paulo Abreu Lima, and with the idea of accentuating the singer's mixed heritage. It would feature in the 2011 album The Rough Guide to World Playtime, being described as having a "delicate beauty that is instantly infectious".

Transparente breaks with the fado tradition of accompanying the vocals only with a 12-string Portuguese guitar, by featuring instruments like the flute, the cello or the accordion.

== Critical reception ==
Professional ratings
Review scores
Source	Rating
AllMusic	3/5 stars
BBC	Positive
The Guardian	3/5 stars
Rascunho	Positive
Rolling Stone	4/5 stars
The Times	4/5 stars

Transparente received positive reviews from music critics, both in Portugal and internationally. Between 2005 and 2006, Mariza embarked on a world tour to promote the album.

When writing about a live concert in Lisbon following the release of Transparente, Nuno Galopim of Diário de Notícias considered the album to be "magnificent", with a "discreet and engaging" sound. Covering a performance at the Teatro Albéniz in Madrid, Carlos Galilea of El País pointed out the unusual instruments that featured in the album, arguing that they contributed to create a new, "extremely beautiful" sound. The critic asserted that although this approach to the genre may seem like a deviation from the roots of fado itself, Mariza was closer to fado than ever. In his review of the event, Galilea also praised the reference to the work of Fernando Pessoa, the "greatest poet born in Portugal", in the song "Há uma Música do Povo".

Clive Davis gave a very complimentary review of the album's music when covering Mariza's 2006 concert at the Royal Albert Hall in London.

In June 2017, the album was included in Blitz's list of the 30 best Portuguese albums of the last 30 years.

== Commercial performance ==
The album had sold more than 15.000 copies in the Netherlands as of February 2006, becoming a golden record in the country. By that time, Transparente was already a double platinum record in Portugal, selling more than 40.000 copies since its release and, by December 2010, the album was a triple platinum record with more than 60.000 copies sold. Transparente also featured for four weeks in France's top albums chart, having peaked at number 126 in April 2005.

Transparente became Mariza's second album to feature on Billboard's World Albums chart, where it peaked at number 7 in October 2005. In June 2005, the album had also ranked number 7 in the World Music Charts Europe, compiled monthly by the European Broadcasting Union, by then the highest position ever achieved by a Portuguese album. The album ranked number 28 in the 2005 overall list by the same organization.

== Track listing ==
Transparente – Standard edition
No.	Title	Writer(s)	Length
1.	"Há uma Música do Povo"	Fernando Pessoa; Mário Pacheco	3:10
2.	"Meu Fado Meu"	Paulo de Carvalho	3:26
3.	"Recusa"	Mário Raínho; José Magala	2:16
4.	"Quando Me Sinto Só"	Artur Ribeiro; Joaquim Campos	2:57
5.	"Montras"	Pedro Campos	3:34
6.	"Há Palavras Que Nos Beijam"	Alexandre O'Neill; Mário Pacheco	2:52
7.	"Transparente"	Paulo Abreu Lima; Rui Veloso	2:31
8.	"Fado Português de Nós"	Paulo de Carvalho	2:23
9.	"Malmequer" (traditional)	Aldina Duarte	3:11
10.	"Medo"	Reinaldo Ferreira; Alain Oulman	3:10
11.	"Toada do Desengano"	Vasco Graça Moura; Franklin Godinho	3:35
12.	"Fado Tordo"	Fernando Tordo	2:13
13.	"Duas Lágrimas de Orvalho"	DR; Pedro Rodrigues	2:36
14.	"Desejos Vãos"	Florbela Espanca; Tiago Machado	3:31
Total length:			41:25

== Certifications ==
Sales certifications for Transparente
Region	Certification	Certified units/sales
Netherlands (NVPI)	Gold	40,000^{^}
Portugal (AFP)	4× Platinum	160,000^{^}
^{^} Shipments figures based on certification alone.

== Sources ==
- Elliott, Richard (2010). "New Citizens of the Fadista World". Fado and the Place of Longing: Loss, Memory and the City. Farnham, Surrey, England: Ashgate Publishing Limited. pp. 152–153. doi:10.4324/9781315094175. ISBN 978-1138246867.
