= Fado (disambiguation) =

Fado is a genre of Portuguese song

Fado may also refer to:

- Fados (film), 2007 Portuguese film directed by Carlos Saura
- Fado Alexandrino, a novel by Portuguese author António Lobo Antunes
- Fado (Carminho album)
- Fado, album by Mísia 1993
- Fado, album by Katia Guerreiro
- Fado Curvo, album by Mariza
- Fado em Mim, 2002 album by Mariza
- Fado Tradicional, 2010 album by Mariza
- FADO, computer documentation system
