= Fort São João Baptista da Foz =

Fort in Porto, Portugal

- Forte de São João Baptista da Foz
- Castro Marim, Portugal
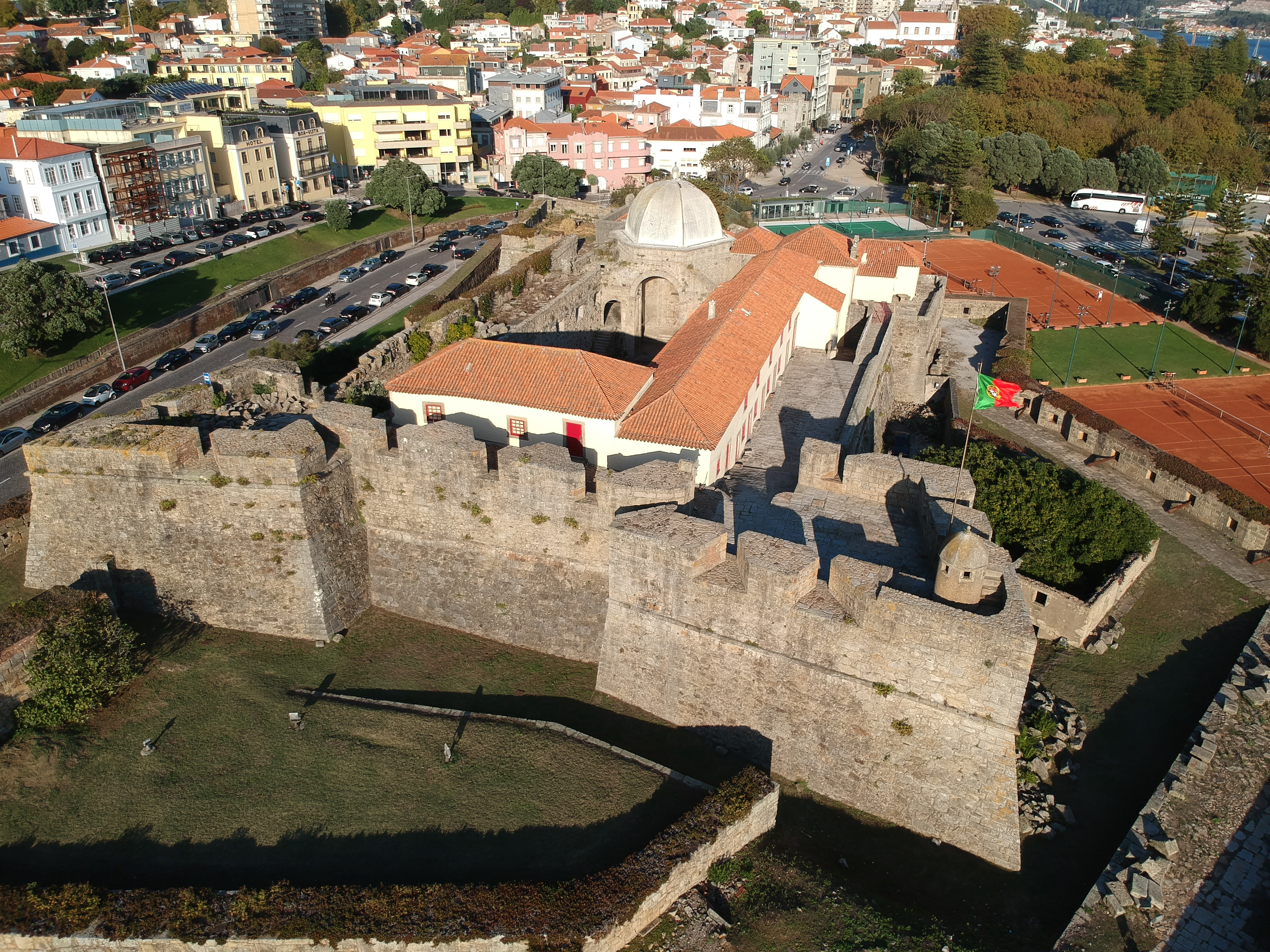
- Aerial view of the fort.

Site information
- Type: Bastion fort
- Condition: Good.

Location
- Coordinates: 41°08′56″N 8°40′28″W

Site history
- Built: 1646-1653
- In use: 17th century.

The Fort São João Baptista da Foz (Forte de São João Baptista da Foz in Portuguese), is located in the parish of Foz do Douro, in the municipality and District of Porto, in Portugal.

It stands in a dominant position at the mouth of the Douro river, overseeing the access the city of Porto via the river.

== History ==
The abbot of Santo Tirso monastery and bishop of Viseu, Dom Miguel da Silva, had a church and abbots residence built where the fort now stands, for which he resorted to the services of the Italian architect Francesco de Cremona. Together with the São Miguel-o-Anjo Lighthouse (completed in 1527 a few hundred meters away from the fort), they were the first manifestations of Renaissance architecture in Northern Portugal).

The fort was commissioned in 1567, one year after an attack by French pirates on Madeira. Construction of the fort began during the reign of King Sebastian (1557–1578), in 1570, and took eight years, under the supervision of João Gomes da Silva, a diplomat and trusted man of the Court and designed by the master of fortifications Simão de Rouen, son of Jean de Rouen, it consisted of a simple bastioned structure, surrounding the old medieval structures of the hospice, monastery, and the church of the Benedictines of Santo Tirso.

With the War of Restoration of independence, the remodeling of the fort was deemed necessary. Fearing a Spanish invasion along the northern border of the kingdom, King John IV (1640–56) dispatched the new Chief Engineer of the Kingdom, the French Charles Lassart, to the city of Porto in 1642. He had the opportunity to verify, in loco, the ineffectiveness of the 16th-century structure in the face of 17th-century offensive means, and he prepared a new project that expanded and reinforced it. The works were in charge of the Benedictine architect João Turriano. However, problems raised by the source of funds at the Porto City Council and personal problems of the forts Lieutenant-Governor Pinto de Matos (1643–1645) significantly delayed the start of the works.

With the appointment of Martim Gonçalves da Câmara, as a replacement for Pinto de Matos (May 1646), work finally started, with the demolition of the Old Church in the same year. The chancel and nave of the church, with the involvement of the bastioned structure and the dismantling of the cover, functioned as the fort's courtyard. Made a priority in the face of the invasion of Minho by Spanish troops, they were completed in 1653. Two years later, it was considered the second stronghold in the kingdom, after Fort São Julião da Barra, and the key to the city of Porto, which the fort not only secured but also the entire province of Entre-Douro e Minho and that of Beira. At the end of the 17th century, in 1694, it was garrisoned by an infantry terço paid by the Porto city hall.

As a result of the evolution of ships and artillery, the fort gradually lost its defensive function, being used as a prison for political prisoners. In 1759, when the Society of Jesus was expelt, 227 Jesuits were held there. Among the illustrious names who were detained in their prisons, at the time of the Marquis of Pombal stand out those of Tomás da Silva Teles, Viscount of Vila Nova de Cerveira (who died there in 1762), and José de Seabra da Silva, and in the 19th century, the liberals José da Silva Passos and the Duke of Terceira.

At the beginning of the 19th century, during the Peninsular War, on June 6, 1808, Sergeant Major Raimundo José Pinheiro occupied its premises and, in the following dawn, hoisted the Portuguese flag on its mast, the first act of Portuguese insurrection against the Napoleonic occupation. The fortification would be involved a few years later in the Portuguese Civil War, having protected the landing of supplies, during the siege of Porto (1832–1833).

In the 20th century it was the residence of the poet Florbela Espanca, wife of one of the officers of the garrison.

It was classified as a "Property of Public Interest" in 1967. After being abandoned for a few years, in the first half of the 1990s, the monument underwent archaeological intervention under the responsibility of the Urban Archeology Office of the Museum and Historical and Artistic Heritage Division of the Porto city council.

It currently houses the National Defense Institute.

== Features ==
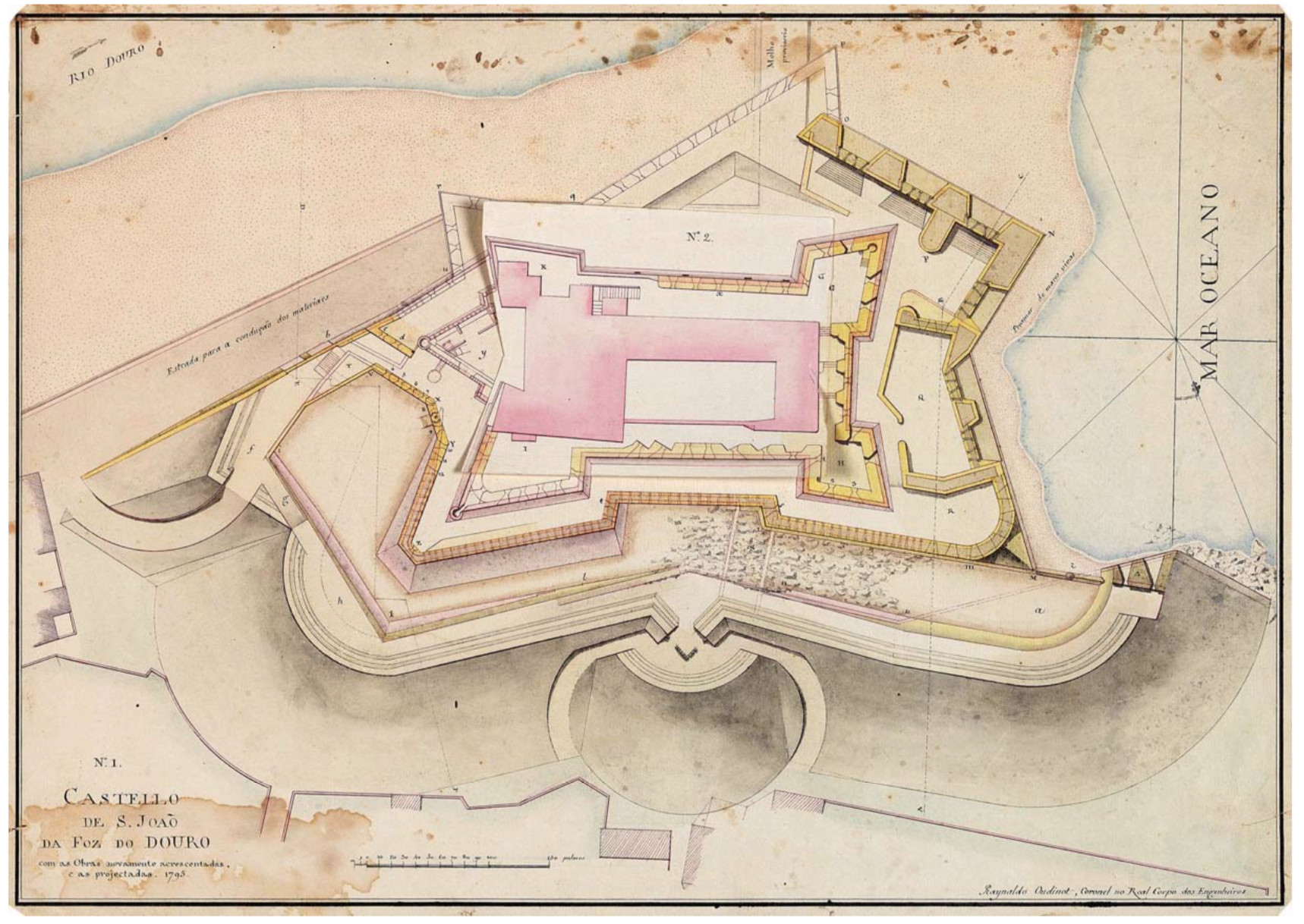
Plan of the fort with proposed additions in 1795.

Lassart's 17th century project did not alter the essentials of the 16th century stronghold although it modified the organic structure. The old church, inserted in the military area, was demolished, the central part of the facade was torn down, the towers were opened, the slabs of the graves on its floor were removed to be reused in the masonry and the vault (the first in Renaissance style in the country) was dismantled. It was converted to a courtyard, while its dependencies were buried to consolidate the embankment of the eastern bastion. The niches of the side altars were boarded up by stone masonry walls.

Based on the reality imposed by the irregularity of the terrain and the preexisting fortification, the plan of the new structure presents the format of an organic rectangle with three bulwarks and a half bulwark, concentrating the artillery fire on the land side, given the natural difficulties of transposition of the Douro river bar. The only bulwark with a regular layout is the one that points to the bar; of the two facing the land side, the one on the east is exceptionally pointed, ending in a spur of great height, while on the west it extends through a spur intended to eliminate a blind spot, currently almost covered by the road embankment.

The new entrance portal to the fort, in neoclassical style, was built by Engineer Reinaldo Oudinot (1796), equipped with a drawbridge, a mated entrance hall and a guard body covering the palatial façade in place of a 17th-century ravelin. This was the last work undertaken, although it was still incomplete in 1827.

== Gallery ==
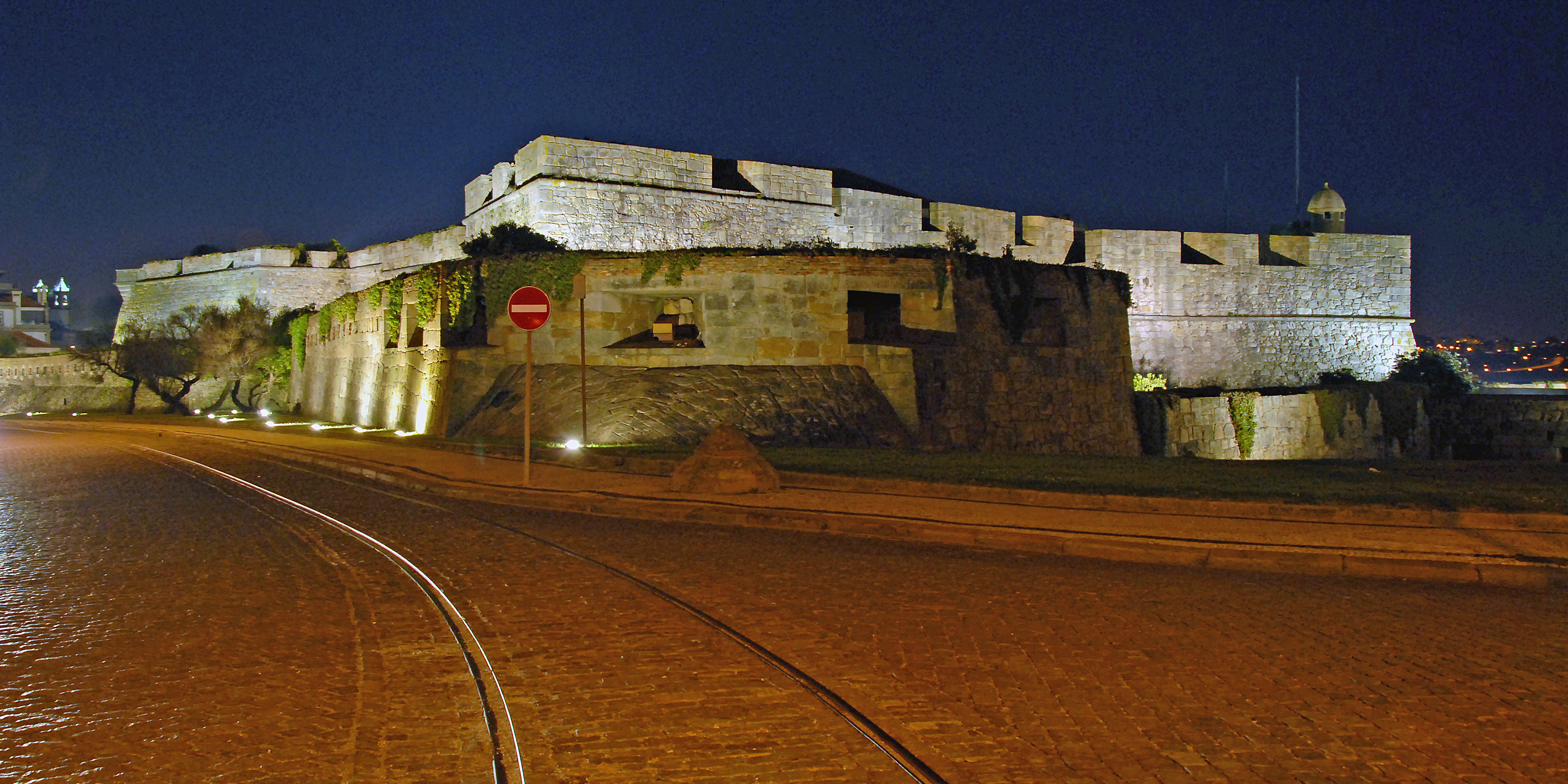

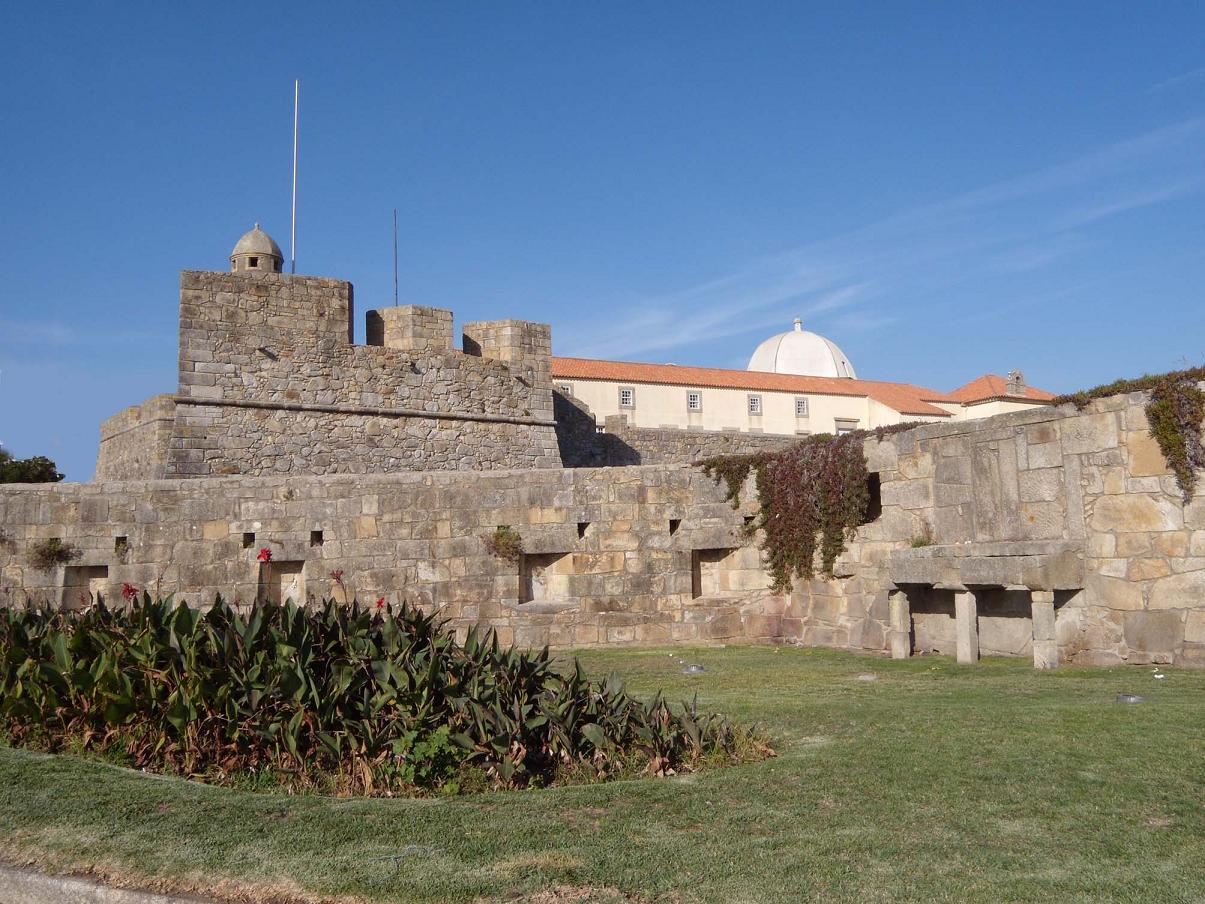

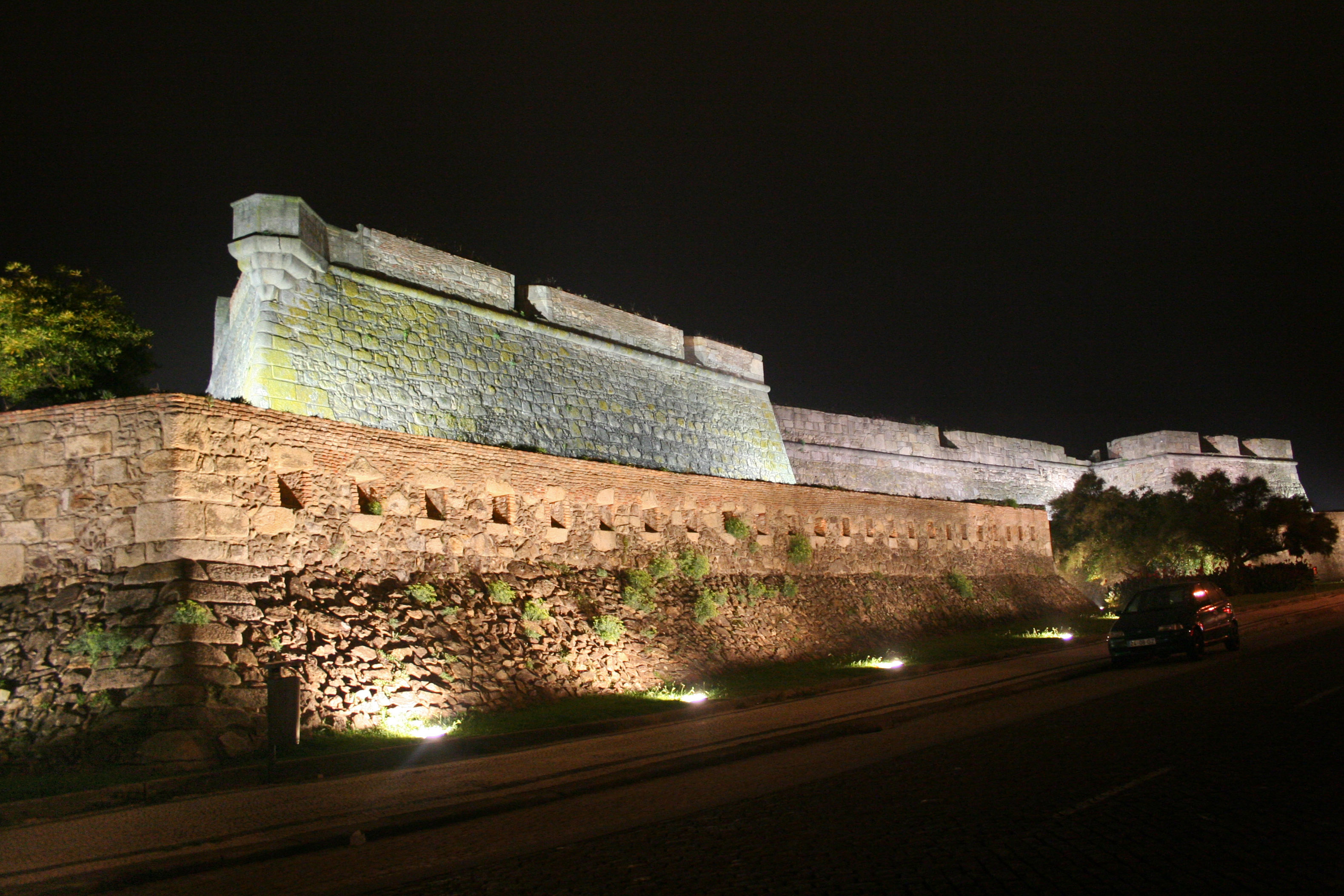

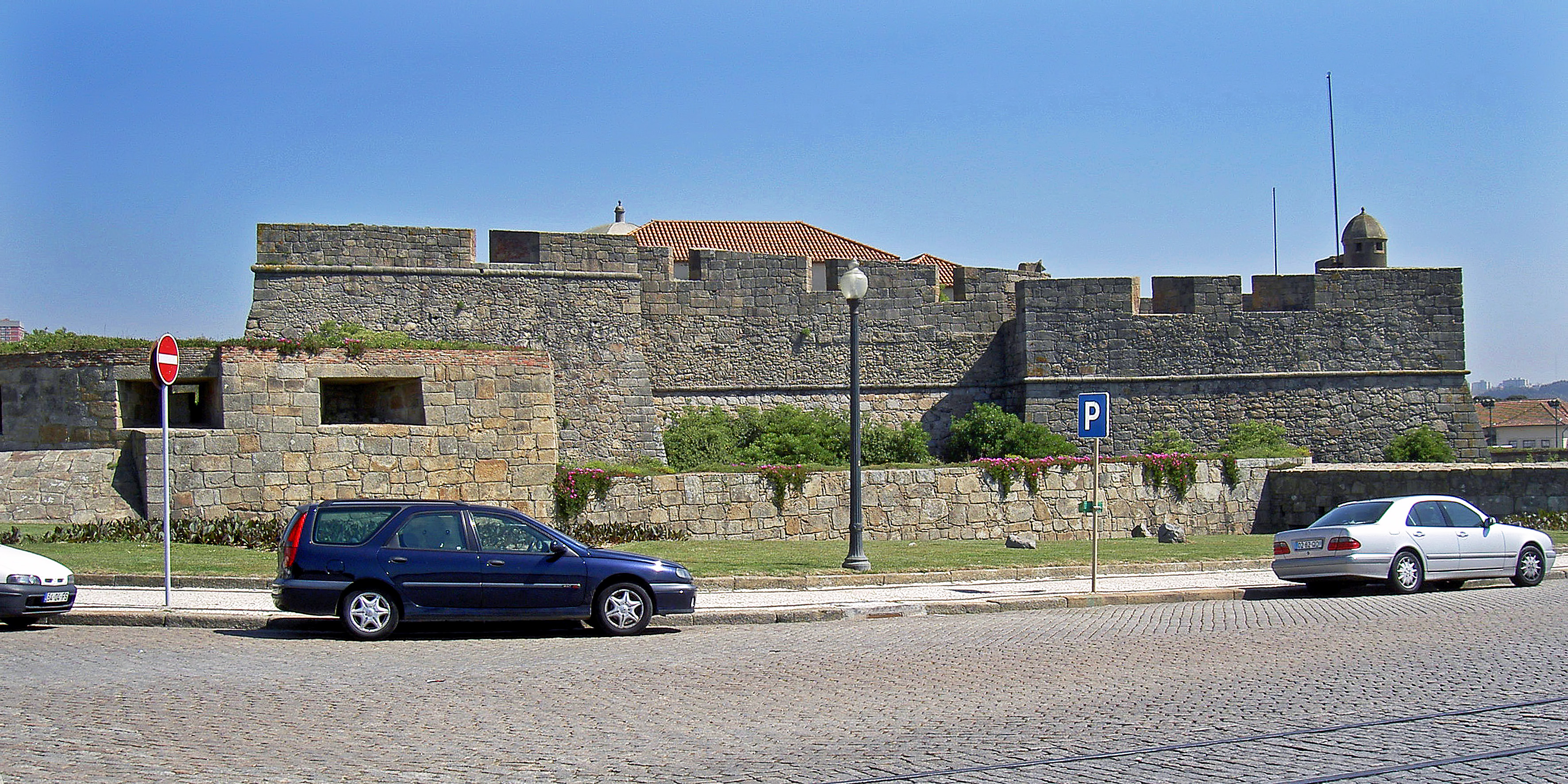

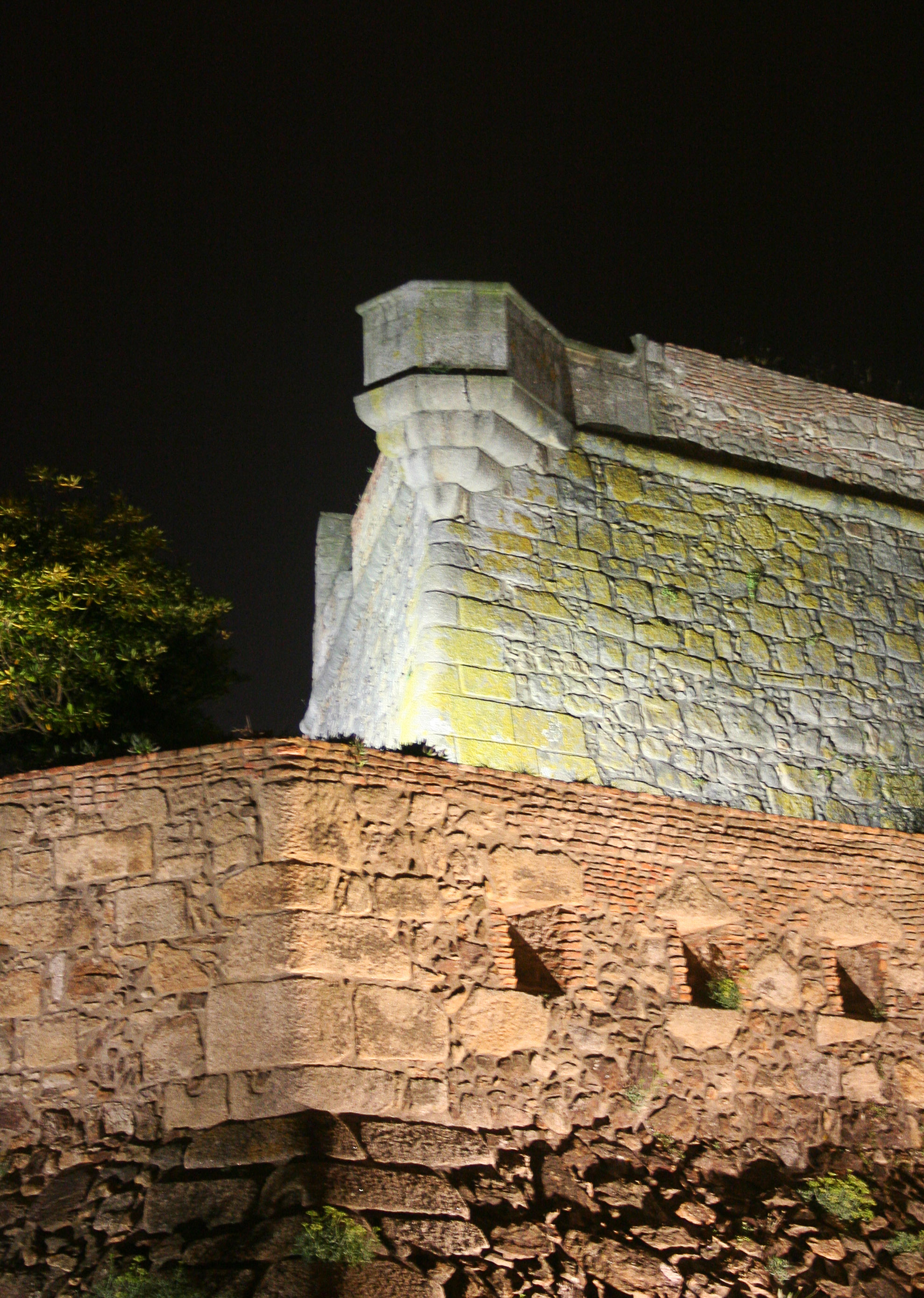

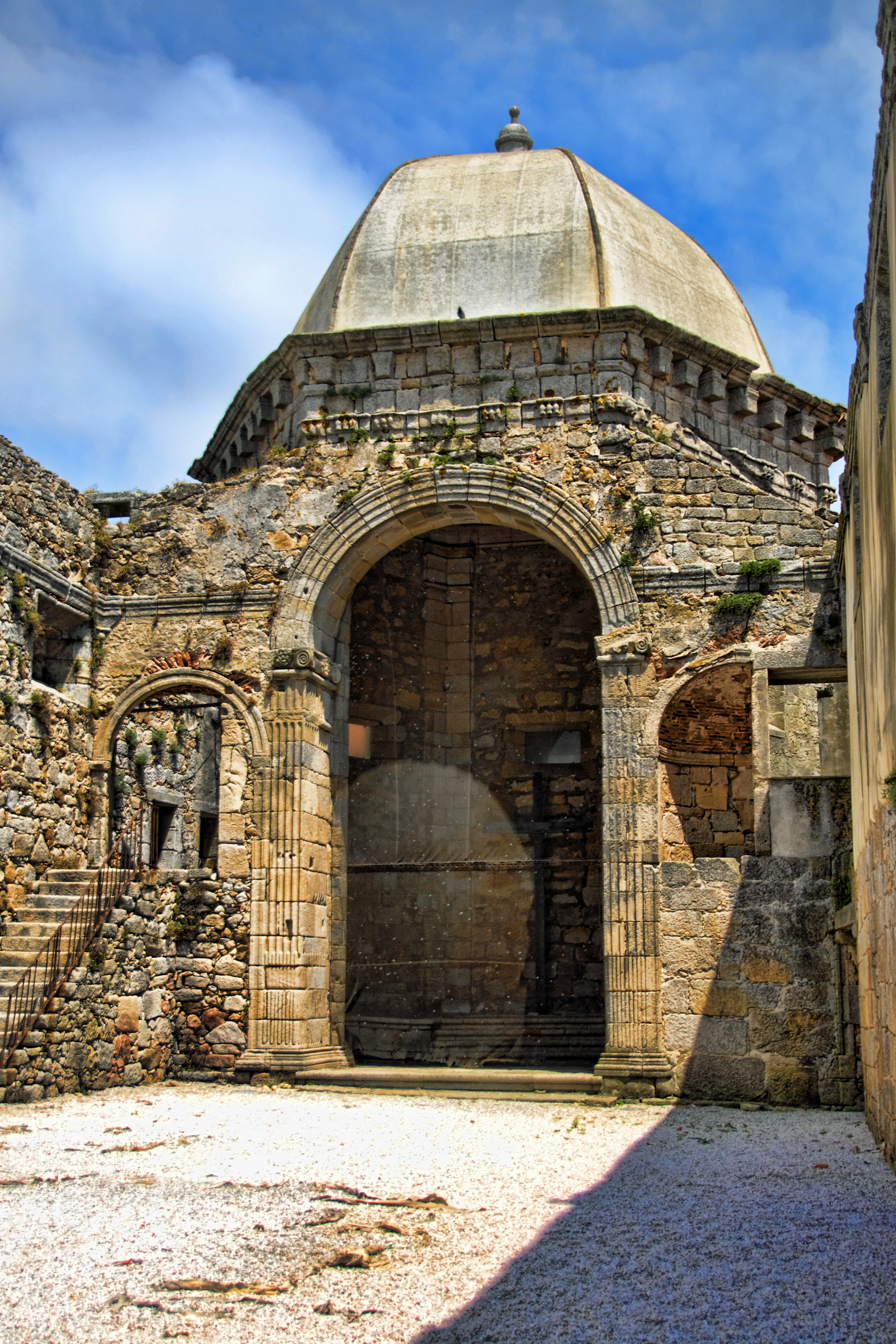

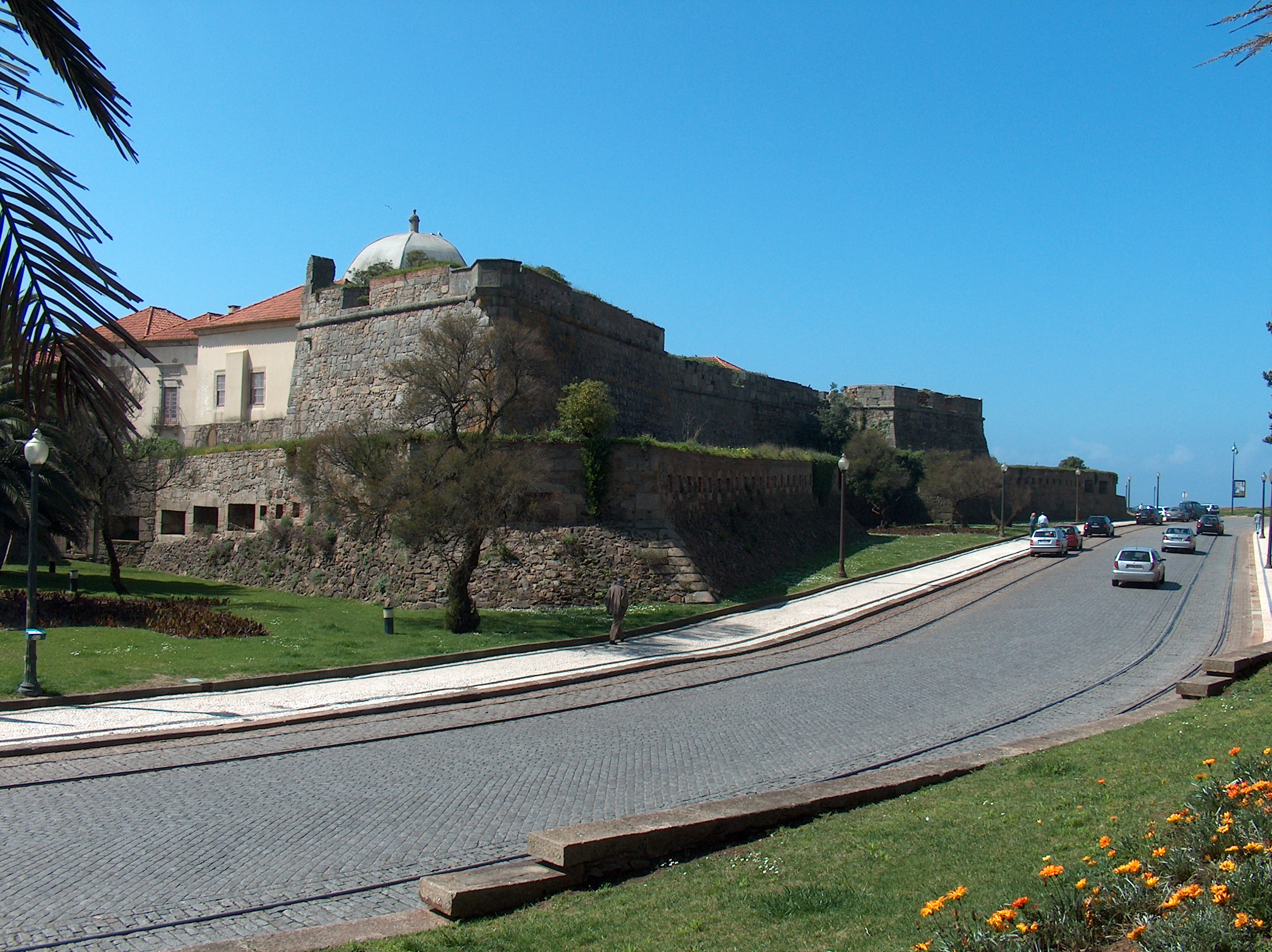

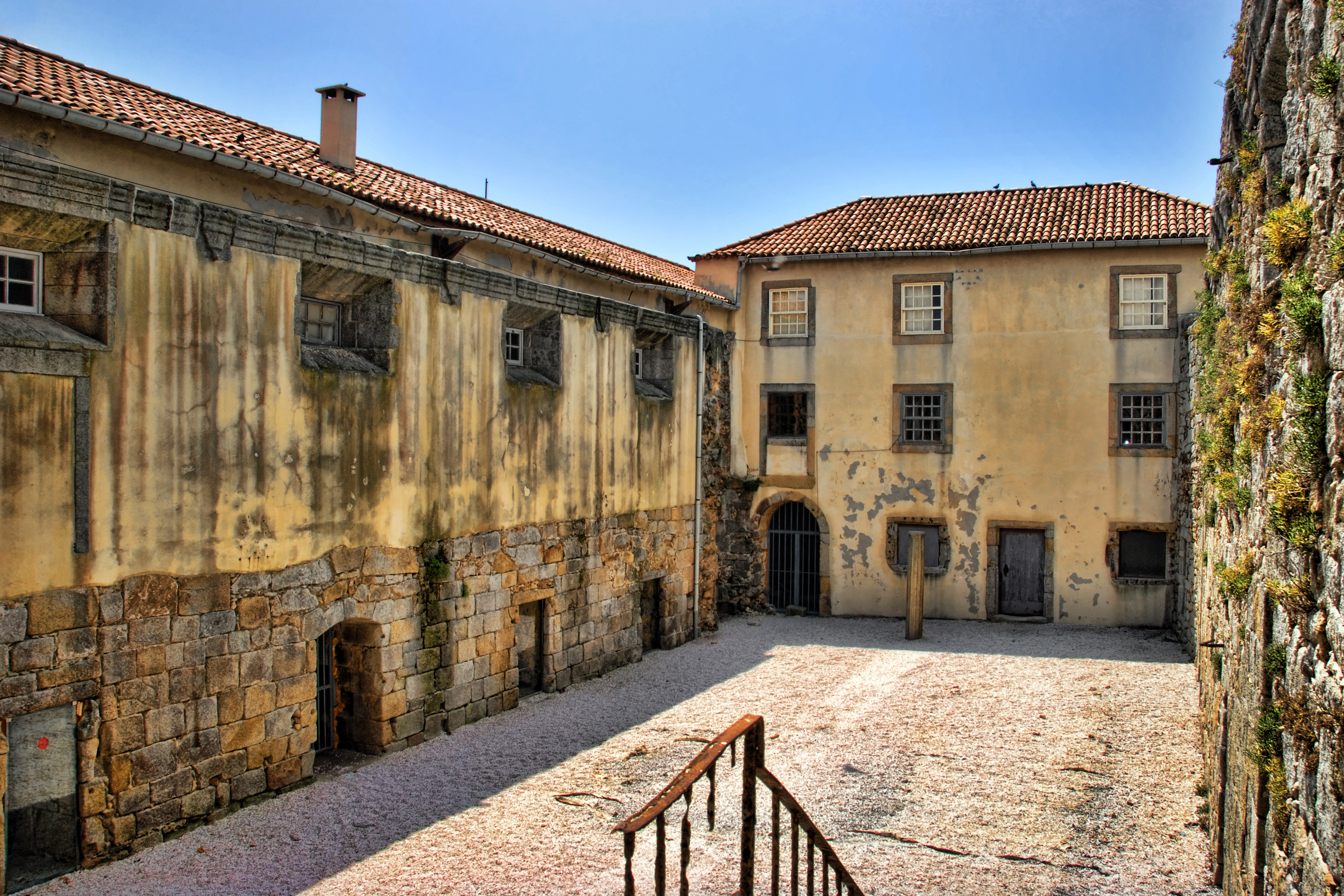
