= Faedo =

Faedo may refer to:

- Faedo, Trentino, populated place in Trentino in the northern Italian region Trentino-Alto Adige/Südtirol
- Faedo (Cudillero), parish in the Cudillero municipality, within the province and autonomous community of Asturias, in northern Spain.
- Faedo (surname), surname
- Faedo Valtellino, municipality in the Province of Sondrio in the Italian region Lombardy

== See also ==
- Fado (disambiguation)
