= Terra (Mariza album) =

Studio album by Mariza
- Released: 30 June 2008
- Genres: Fado, World music
- Length: 52:00
- Labels: EMI Music; Four Quarters Entertainment
- Producer: Javier Limón

Mariza chronology
Concerto em Lisboa (2006)	Terra (2008)	Fado Tradicional (2010)

Terra is the fourth studio album by Portuguese fado singer Mariza, released on 30 June 2008. At the Latin Grammy Awards, it was nominated for both Best Folk Album and Best Producer. Contributions from Cape Verdean singer Tito Paris, Argentine guitarist Dominic Miller, and Spanish singer Concha Buika give Terra a jazz, African, and Latin influence. Also included at the end of the album is a cover of Charlie Chaplin's famous ballad, "Smile".

== Reception ==
Professional ratings
Review scores
Source	Rating
AllMusic	3.5/5 stars
BBC	Mixed
The Guardian	3/5 stars
Rolling Stone	3.5/5 stars
The Washington Post	Favorable

Terra was the album of Mariza that more experimented with languages not close associated with fado.

Terra became Mariza's fourth album to feature on Billboard's World Albums chart, where it peaked at number 5 in March 2009.

== Track listing ==
Terra
No.	Title	Writer(s)	Length
1.	"Já Me Deixou"	Artur Ribeiro; Max	3:49
2.	"Minh'Alma"	Paulo de Carvalho	4:03
3.	"Rosa Branca"	José de Jesus Guimarães; Resende Dias	2:46
4.	"Recurso"	David Mourão-Ferreira; Tiago Machado	3:06
5.	"Beijo De Saudade"	B.leza	4:17
6.	"Vozes Do Mar"	Florbela Espanca; Diogo Clemente	3:55
7.	"Fronteira"	Pedro Homem de Mello; Mário Pacheco	2:48
8.	"Alfama"	Ary dos Santos; Alain Oulman	4:02
9.	"Tasco Da Mouraria"	Paulo Abreu Lima; Rui Veloso	4:30
10.	"Alma De Vento"	Diogo Clemente; Dominic Miller	4:01
11.	"Se Eu Mandasse Nas Palavras"	Fernando Tordo	3:21
12.	"As Guitarras"	Ivan Lins	4:16
13.	"Pequenas Verdades"	Javier Limón	3:07
14.	"Morada Aberta"	Carlos Tê; Rui Veloso	3:59
Total length:			52:00

== Personnel ==
- Vocals: Mariza, Concha Buika, Tito Paris
- Acoustic Guitar: Bernardo Couto, Diogo Clemente, Dominic Miller
- Flamenco Guitar: Javier Limón
- Recorder: Melissa Nanni
- Trumpet: Carlos Sarduy
- Piano: Ivan "Melon" Lewis, Chucho Miller
- Acoustic Bass: Marino De Freitas
- Double Bass: Dany Noel
- Percussion: Pirana
