= Fado Curvo =

Studio album by Mariza
- Released: 6 May 2003
- Genre: Fado
- Length: 42:06
- Labels: World Connection, Warner Music Portugal
- Producer: Carlos Maria Trindade

Mariza chronology
Fado em Mim (2002)	Fado Curvo (2003)	Transparente (2005)

Fado Curvo is the second studio album by Portuguese fado singer Mariza, released on 6 May 2003.

== Reception ==
Professional ratings
Review scores
Source	Rating
AllMusic	3/5 stars
BBC	Positive
The Guardian	4/5 stars
PopMatters	Positive
The Times	5/5 stars
Uncut	4/5 stars

Fado Curvo became Mariza's first album to feature on Billboard's World Albums chart, where it peaked at number 6 in June 2003. The album is a certified quadruple platinum record in Portugal: by December 2004, it had sold 80,000 copies in the country, which awarded the album double platinum.

Reactions to the album were positive, with critics underlining its experimental nature and the blending of traditional songs with contemporary arrangements and compositions. The great range of emotions expressed in Fado Curvo was noted by critics, that considered it to be a breakaway from one of the old traditions of fado, that is to focus on sadness.

Mike Joyce of The Washington Post said that even listeners not well acquainted with fado would not be indifferent to Mariza's voice, that he qualified as being "a dark, rich, commanding contralto".

== Track listing ==
No.	Title	Length
1.	"O Silêncio da Guitarra" (José Luis Gordo/Zé Negro (Fado tradicional))	2:51
2.	"Cavaleiro Monge" (Fernando Pessoa/Mário Pacheco)	3:40
3.	"Feira de Castro" (Paulo Abreu Lima/Rui Veloso)	2:33
4.	"Vielas de Alfama" (Maximiano de Sousa/Artur Ribeiro)	4:01
5.	"Retrato" (Eugénio de Andrade/Tiago Machado)	4:01
6.	"Fado Curvo" (Carlos Maria Trindade)	2:53
7.	"Menino do Bairro Negro" (José Afonso)	2:54
8.	"Caravelas" (Florbela Espanca/Tiago Machado)	5:04
9.	"Entre o Rio e a Razão" (Gil do Carmo/Fernando Araújo)	1:58
10.	"O Deserto" (Carlos Maria Trindade)	5:35
11.	"Primavera" (David Mourão Ferreira/Pedro Rodrigues)	4:42
12.	"Anéis do Meu Cabelo" (António Botto/Tiago Machado)	1:54
Total length:		42:06

== Musicians ==
- Mariza - voice
- Mário Pacheco - guitar
- António Neto - guitar
- Manio Freitas - bass
- Tiago Machado - piano (tracks 5 & 12)
- Carlos Maria Trindade - piano (track 10)
- Fernando Araújo - bass and guitar (track 9)
- Quiné - percussion (tracks 3 & 6)
- Miguel Gonçalves - trumpet and flugelhorn (track 10)
- Davide Zaccaria - cello (track 5)

== Charts ==
=== Weekly charts ===
Chart performance for Fado Curvo
Chart (2003–2008)	Peak position
Dutch Albums (Album Top 100)	45
French Albums (SNEP)	116
Norwegian Albums (VG-lista)	38
Portuguese Albums (AFP)	2
US World Albums (Billboard)	6

== Certifications ==
Certifications for Fado Curvo
Region	Certification	Certified units/sales
Portugal (AFP)	6× Platinum	240,000^{^}
^{^} Shipments figures based on certification alone.
