= Mundo (Mariza album) =

Studio album by Mariza
- Released: 2015
- Genre: Fado
- Label: Warner Music Portugal

Mariza chronology
Fado Tradicional (2015)	Mundo (2015)	Mariza (2018)

Mariza is the sixth studio album by fado singer Mariza. It was released in 2015 by Warner Music Portugal. The album peaked at No. 1 on the Associação Fonográfica Portuguesa chart and was certified as a double platinum album. It also reached No. 13 on US World chart. The album received a Latin Grammy nomination for Best Portuguese Language Contemporary Pop Album in 2016.

== Track listing ==
1. Rio de Mágoa (Rosa Lobato de Faria, Mario Pacheco) [3:17]
2. Melhor de Mim (AC Firmino, Tiago Machado) [4:08]
3. Alma (Javier Limón) [3:12]
4. Saudade Solta (Luís José Martins, Pedro Da Silva Martins) [3:32]
5. Sem Ti (Miguel Gameiro) [5:00]
6. Maldição (Fado Cravo, Alfredo Marceneiro, Armando Vieira Pinto) [4:48]
7. Padoce de Céu Azul [3:51]
8. Caprichosa (Froilán Aguilar) [2:37]
9. Paixão (Jorge Fernando) [3:01]
10. Anda o Sol na Minha Rua (David Mourão Ferreira, Fontes Rocha) [2:27]
11. Adeus (Pedro Jóia, Cabral Do Nascimento) [2:57]
12. Missangas (Paulo de Carvalho, Paulo Abreu Lima) [3:39]
13. Sombra (Jorge Fernando) [3:51]
14. Meu Amor Pequenino (Paulo Abreu Lima, Rui Veloso) [2:29]
