= Fado em Mim =

Studio album by Mariza
- Released: April 2002
- Studio: Pé de Vento Studios (Portugal)
- Genre: Fado, World Music
- Length: 45:56
- Label: World Connection, Parlophone
- Producer: Jorge Fernando, Tiago Machado

Mariza chronology
Fado em Mim (2002)	Fado Curvo (2003)

Professional ratings
Review scores
Source	Rating
Allmusic	4/5 stars
BBC	Positive
PopMatters	Positive

Fado em Mim is the debut studio album of Portuguese fado singer Mariza, released in April 2002 by Dutch label World Connection. A special collectors' edition, containing an additional CD with 8 live tracks recorded at the WOMAD 2002, was released later.

== Release ==
Fado em Mim, Mariza's debut studio album, was initially rejected by Portuguese labels, who were uneasy working with an unproven artist. The album was picked up by Dutch label World Connection and was later released in 32 countries.

== Reception ==
In January 2004, Mariza was awarded the European Border Breakers Award for the international sales of Fado em Mim.

== Track listing ==
Fado em Mim – Standard edition
No.	Title	Writer(s)	Length
1.	"Loucura"	Júlio Campos Sousa; Frederico de Brito	3:28
2.	"Poetas"	Florbela Espanca; Tiago Machado	3:25
3.	"Chuva"	Jorge Fernando	4:04
4.	"Maria Lisboa"	David Mourão-Ferreira; Alain Oulman	2:42
5.	"Ó Gente Da Minha Terra"	Amália Rodrigues; Tiago Machado	4:02
6.	"Que Deus Me Perdoe"	Silva Tavares; Frederico Valério	3:36
7.	"Há Festa Na Mouraria"	A. Amargo; A. Duarte	3:14
8.	"Terra d'Água"	Jorge Fernando	2:29
9.	"Oiça Lá Ó Senhor Vinho"	Alberto Janes	2:58
10.	"Por Ti!" (Fado Tango - traditional)	J.Luís Gordo	3:29
11.	"Oxalá"	Jorge Fernando	2:26
12.	"Barco Negro"	David Mourão-Ferreira; Caco Velho-Parantini	4:00
13.	"Ó Gente Da Minha Terra" (Piano version)		5:53
Total length:			45:56

Disk 2 – from the Special Edition Live at the Womad 2002
No.	Title	Length
1.	"Loucura" (Live at the Womad 2002)	4:23
2.	"Maria Lisboa" (Live at the Womad 2002)	2:48
3.	"Barco Negro" (Live at the Womad 2002)	4:52
4.	"Variações Sobre Armandinho" (Live at the Womad 2002)	3:57
5.	"Primavera" (Live at the Womad 2002)	5:14
6.	"Há Festa Na Mouraria" (Live at the Womad 2002)	2:55
7.	"Oiça Lá Ó Senhor Vinho" (Live at the Womad 2002)	3:27
8.	"Estranha Forma de Vida" (Live at the Womad 2002)	5:06
Total length:		32:44

== Personnel ==
- Mariza – Vocals
- Custódio Castelo – Portuguese Guitar
- Jorge Fernando – Classic Guitar/Viola
- António Neto – Classic Guitar/Viola ("Poetas" & "Ó Gente da Minha Terra")
- Marino Freitas – Acoustic Bass
- Ricardo Cruz – Acoustic Bass ("Ó Gente da Minha Terra" & "Oiça Lá Ó Senhor Vinho), Double Bass ("Poetas" & "Por Ti")
- Tiago Machado – Piano ("Poetas" & "Ó Gente da Minha Terra"[hidden track])
- Dalú – Percussion ("Barco Negro")
- Davide Zaccaria – Cello ("Há Festa Na Mouraria")
- Fernando Nunes – Engineering
- Jorge Fernando, Tiago Machado – Production and Arrangement
- João Pedro Ruela, Albert Nijimolen – Executive Production
