= Fountain of Passeio Alegre =

Fountain in Porto, Portugal

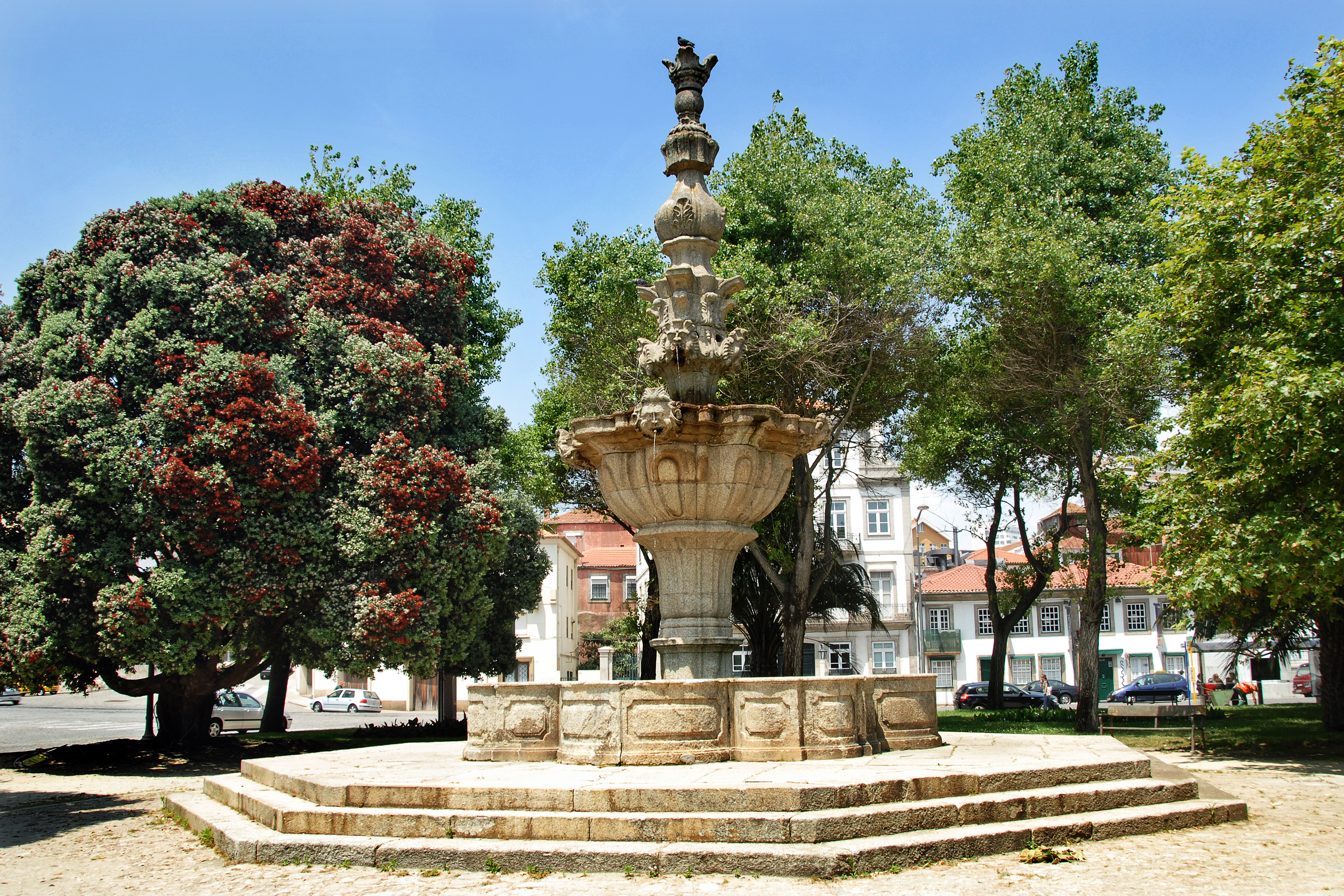
- The ornate fusifomr fountain of Chafariz do Passeio Alegre along the Rua D. Luís Filipe
- Artist: Nicolau Nasoni
- Year: 18th century
- Medium: Granite Fountain
- Location: Porto, Portugal
- 41°8′55.3″N 8°40′21.2″W

The Fountain of Passeio Alegre (Portuguese: Chafariz do Passeio Alegre) is a fountain located in civil parish of Aldoar, Foz do Douro e Nevogilde, municipality of Porto in northern Portugal.

== History ==
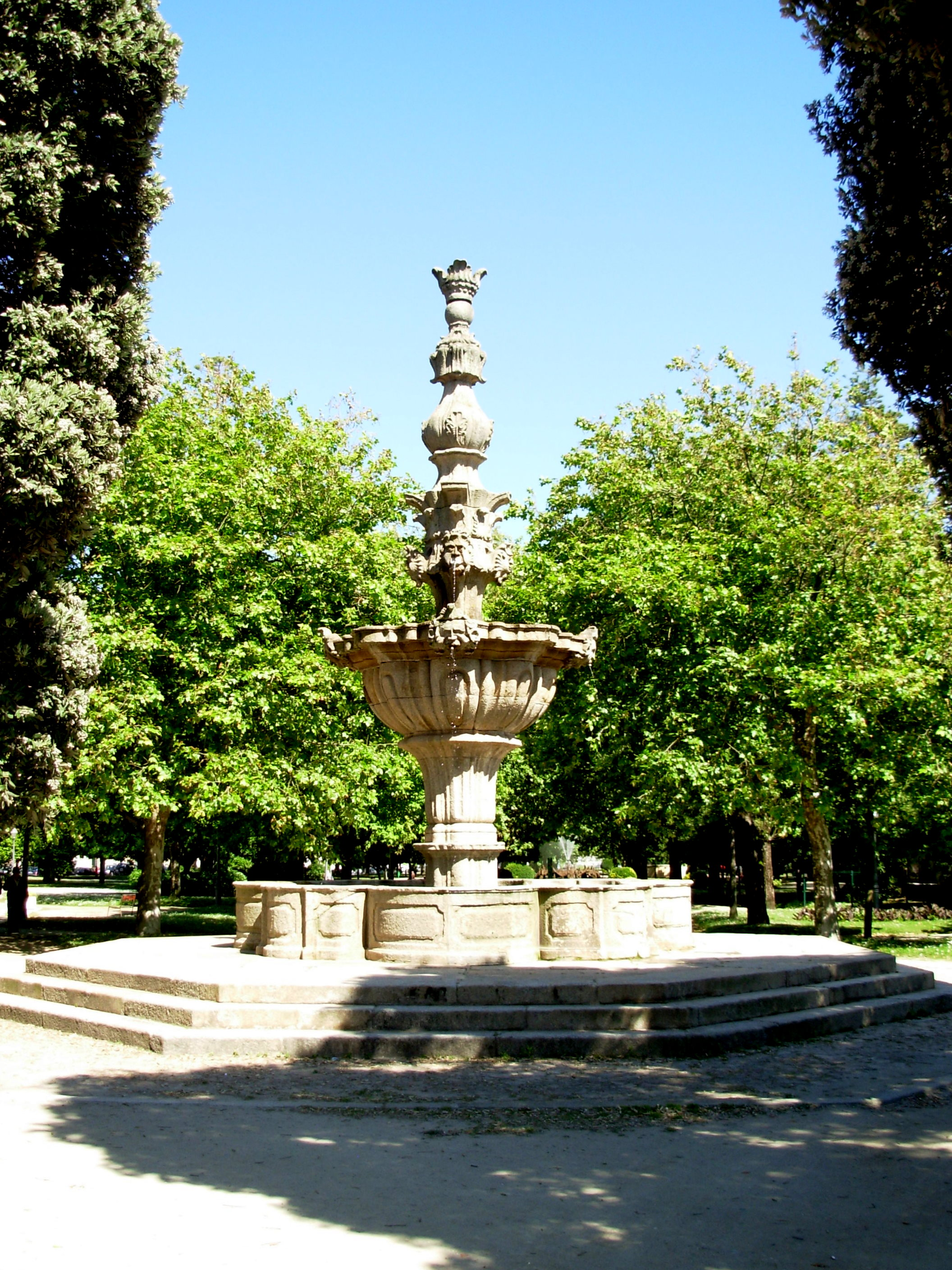
The obelisk-like fountain with ornate dish and vegetal/zoomorphic decorative elements

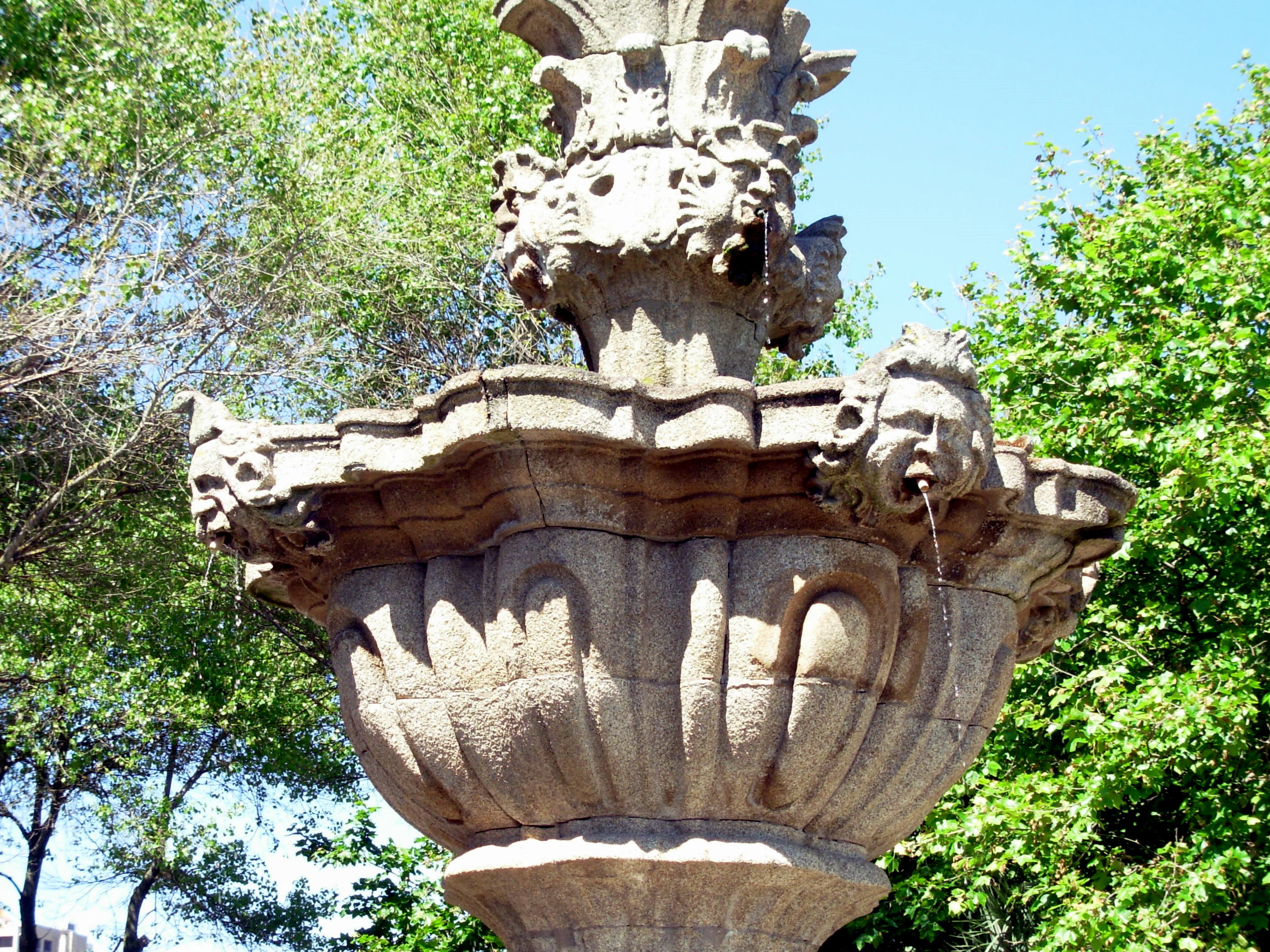
The ornate dish with decorative carrancas and waterspouts

In the 18th century, Nicolau Nasoni was charged with a project to integrate a group of decorative elements into the gardens of Quinta da Prelada, then-property of the Noronha e Meneses family.

Following the purchase of Quinta da Prelada by the municipal authority of Porto in the 20th century, the fountain was de-constructed and transferred to the garden of Passeio Alegre located along the mouth of the northern bank of the Douro.

On 15 April 2008, there was a proposal by the DRCNorte to establish a Special Protection Zone that included the fountain of Foz Velha, Dois Obeliscos da Quinta da Prelada, Forte de São João Baptista, Igreja de São João Baptista e Zona do Passeio Alegre and revoking the ZEP for the Torre, Farol e Capela de São Miguel-o-Anjo the church of São João Baptista and the garden of Passeio Alegre. On 12 September 2011, a new proposal was executed by the DRCNorte to classify the group of structures and buildings, that included the fountain.

== Architecture ==
The fountain is located in the Garden of Passeio Alegre, a large, dense garden/park situated on the northern bank and mouth of the Douro River. It is situated at the western limit of the park close to the intersection of Rua D. Luís Filipe and Rua do Passeio Alegre, nearby a Swiss-type Chalet café.

The fusiform column with dish and four carrancas that act as spouts to a larger dish, in the form of a cloverleaf. The fountain is mounted on a small platform preceded by three stairs. The column is decorated with vegetal and zoomorphic sculptures throughout and topped by a sphere and flame-like sculpted burst.
