= Mariza canta Amália =

Studio album by Mariza
- Released: November 27, 2020
- Genre: Fado
- Length: 38:34
- Label: Warner Music Portugal

Mariza chronology
Mariza (2018)	Mariza canta Amália (2020)

Mariza canta Amália is the eighth studio album by fado singer Mariza. It was released in 2020 by Warner Music Portugal. The album peaked at No. 1 on the Associação Fonográfica Portuguesa chart.

== Track listing ==
1. Com Que Voz 4:16
2. Barco Negro 4:45
3. Lágrima 3:40
4. Formiga Bossa Nova 3:19
5. Estranha Forma De Vida 3:15
6. Cravos De Papel 2:37
7. Povo Que Lavas No Rio 4:43
8. Foi Deus 3:41
9. Gaivota 3:29
10. Fado Português 4:49
