= Mariza =

Portuguese fado singer (born 1973)

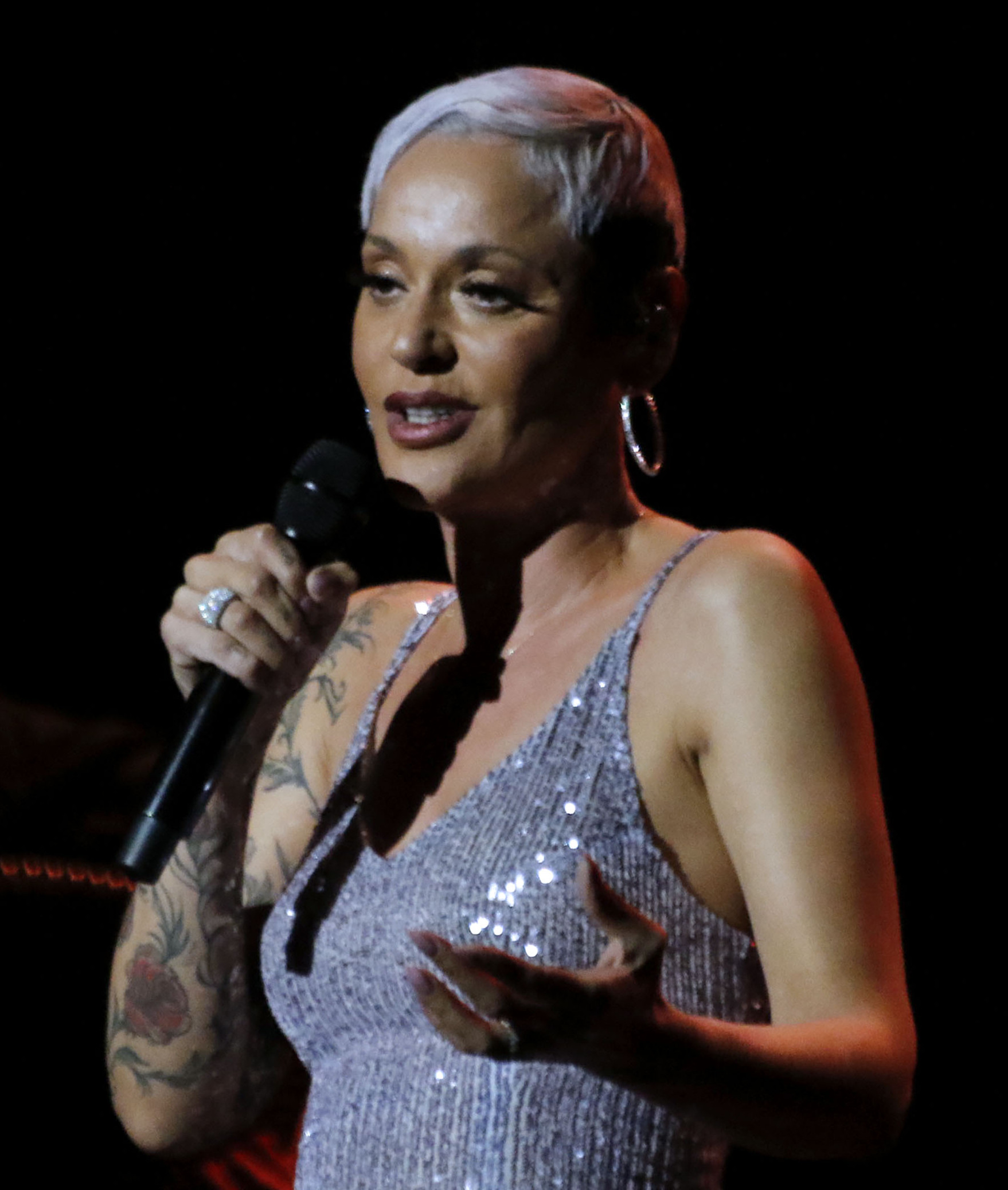
- Mariza in 2022

Background information
- Born: Marisa dos Reis Nunes; 16 December 1973 (age 52); Lourenço Marques, Portuguese Mozambique
- Origin: Lisbon, Portugal
- Genres: Fado; world music; adult contemporary music
- Occupations: Musician; songwriter
- Instrument: Vocals
- Years active: 1997–present
- Label: Warner Music
- Website: www.mariza.com

Marisa dos Reis Nunes ComIH (born 16 December 1973), known professionally as Mariza (Portuguese pronunciation: [mɐˈɾizɐ]), is a Portuguese fado singer.

Mariza was born in Lourenço Marques, Portuguese Mozambique, to a Portuguese father, José Brandão Nunes, and a Mozambican mother, Isabel Nunes and her great grandmother was from Goa. When she was three years old, her family moved to Metropolitan Portugal, and she was raised in Lisbon's historic quarters of Mouraria and Alfama. While very young, she began singing in a wide variety of musical styles, including gospel, soul and jazz. Her father strongly encouraged her to adopt fado; he felt that participating in the traditional music would grant her greater acceptance in the Portuguese community. Mariza has sold over 1 million records worldwide.

== Music career ==
In 1999, fado's most famous and beloved interpreter, Amália Rodrigues died. In the public remembrance and mourning that followed, fado regained much of its previous popularity, and Mariza was asked to perform a broadcast tribute to Rodrigues' memory, which caused her friends to begin urging her to record an album of fado music. She did so, and in 2001 Fado em Mim was released. It sold an astounding 100,000 copies (4,000 copies of a fado disc would have been considered successful). After this the record company made the disc available worldwide, and sales eventually topped 140,000 copies.

One of Mariza's hit songs, Transparente is a tribute to her African grandmother.

Mariza sang the Portuguese national anthem at the 2002 FIFA World Cup of football, at the game which pitted the home team (South Korea) against Portugal.

By the time Mariza's second album, Fado Curvo, was released in 2003, she was considered a member of the New Fado movement, with a voice reminiscent of traditional divas of the musical form such as Rodrigues. Her interpretations of fado standards brought her rapid international recognition, leading to her being the recipient, in March 2003, of BBC Radio 3's award for Best European Artist in World Music. Her British television debut was on Later with Jools Holland. For the Olympic Games of Athens 2004 she sang "A Thousand Years," as a duet with Sting. It was released on the official pop album of the Athens Olympics, Unity, on which fado is sung in English and Portuguese.

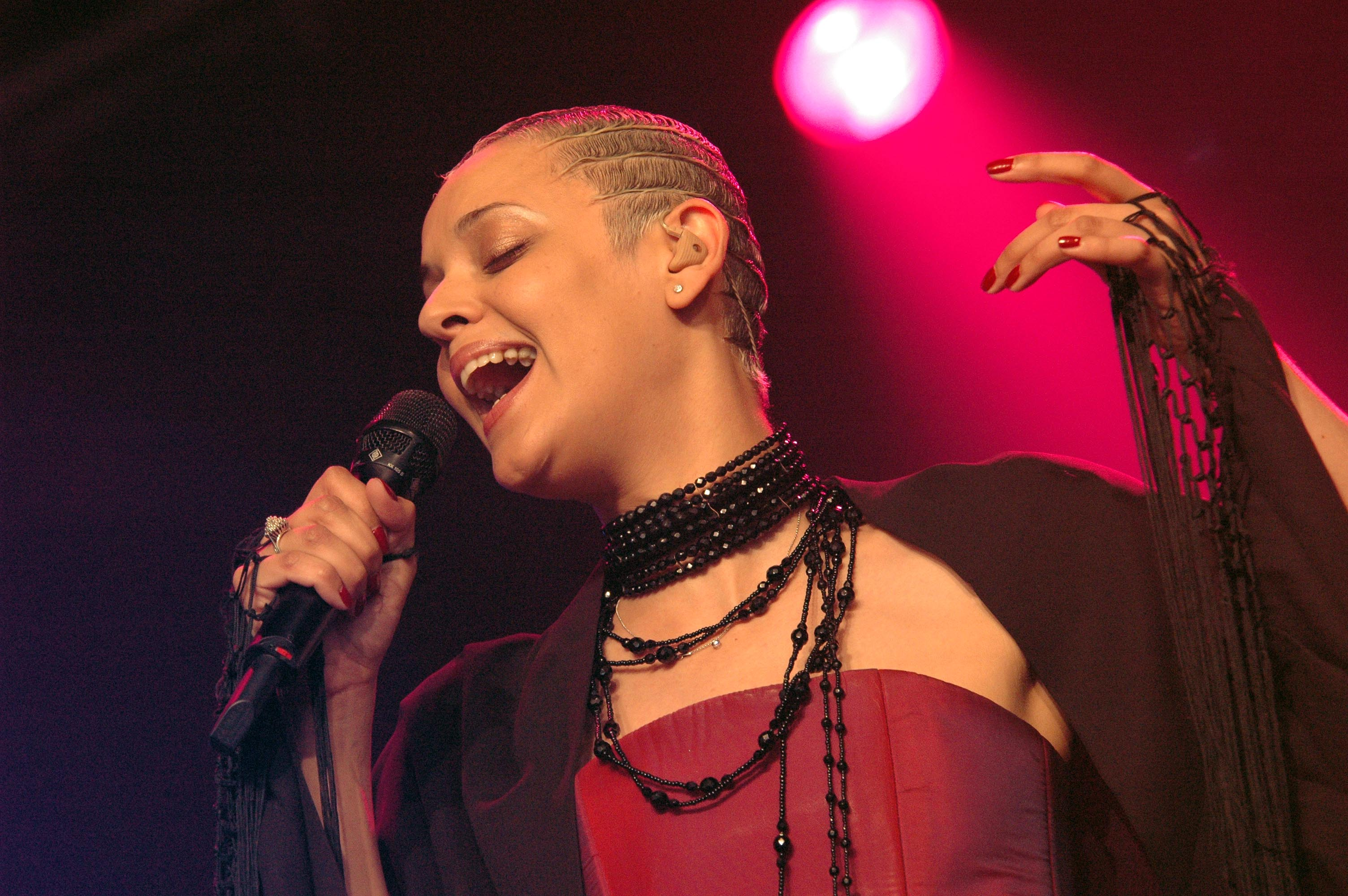
Mariza performing in Cambridge, England in 2004

In 2004 Mariza won an EBBA Award. Every year the European Border Breakers Awards (EBBA) recognize the success of ten emerging artists or groups who reached audiences outside their own countries with their first internationally released album in the past year.

Mariza's third album, Transparente, was recorded in Brazil and released in 2005. She performed at Live 8; she sang at the Eden Project in Cornwall, after which she has been invited to concerts and events worldwide to promote Portuguese culture, from Australia to Finland, the United States and Argentina. That album eventually reached Top Ten in countries which include The Netherlands, Spain and Finland. Mariza, who lives in the upmarket Alcântara dockside area of Lisbon, has received awards from Denmark, Australia, Canada, Germany, UK, Guinea-Bissau and Equatorial Guinea.

She has performed at venues such as New York's Carnegie Hall and Central Park, Walt Disney Concert Hall, Barbican, Hollywood Bowl, London's Royal Albert Hall, Union Chapel, Royal Festival Hall, Lisbon's Centro Cultural de Belém, Frankfurt's Alte Oper, Paris' Théâtre de la Ville, Madrid's Teatro Albéniz, Barcelona's Teatro Grec, X Cairo International Song Festival 2004, Centro Cultural de Macau, Moscow International House of Music, Toronto's Massey Hall, Sydney Opera House and the National Concert Hall in Dublin in February 2010.

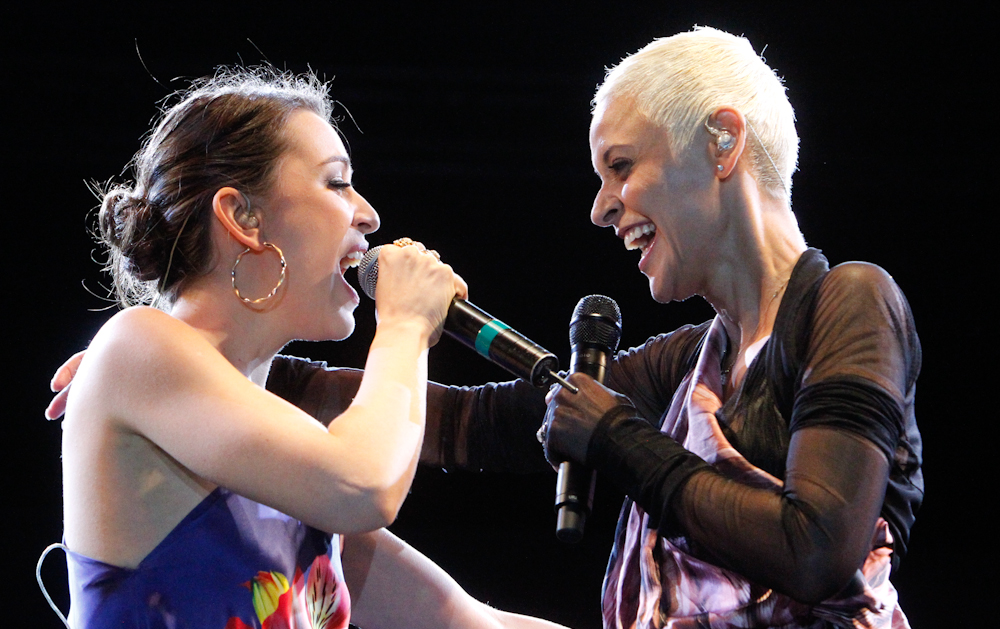
Roberta Sá and Mariza

Her album released in 2007 Concerto em Lisboa received a Latin Grammy nomination for Best Folk Album. The following year, she again released an album, Terra which also was nominated for Best Folk Album at the Latin Grammy Awards. This album continued to mix a variety of genres, containing basic fado influenced by jazz, flamenco, Latin and African sounds.

In 2010, Mariza was featured in the pilot episode of the PBS music series, Sound Tracks: Music Without Borders, singing the "global hit" -- "Minh' Alma." In 2010, Mariza released the album Fado Tradicional, returning to the roots of Fado, but also interpreting the music in Mariza's unique style.

Beginning on 28 February 2011 the airline TAP Portugal began airing its "TAP With Arms Wide Open" (TAP de Braços Abertos) campaign, featuring its new slogan. Three singers, Mariza, the Brazilian singer Roberta de Sá, and the Angolan singer Paulo Flores starred in a music video with the song "Arms Wide Open."

Mariza performed alongside Ana Moura as the opening act of the Grand Final of the Eurovision Song Contest 2018 held in Lisbon, Portugal, singing "Barco Negro".

In May 2024, Mariza released the single "Desamor" (featuring GSon), from her forthcoming album Amor.

== Personal life ==
Mariza was married to António Ferreira, father of the singer's first and only child, Martim, born on 6 July 2011 two months ahead of schedule, and later diagnosed with attention deficit hyperactivity disorder. Mariza said that her Catholic faith strengthened as a result of a promise that she made to Our Lady of Fátima, after the birth of her son.

== Discography ==
=== Studio albums ===
Year	Title	Chart positions									Certifications
Year	Title	POR	FIN	FRA	NED	BEL	NOR	SPA	POL	US World	Certifications
2002	Fado em Mim	4	40	—	59	—	—	—	—	—	AFP: 6× Platinum
2003	Fado Curvo	2	—	116	45	—	38	—	—	6	AFP: 6× Platinum
2005	Transparente	1	8	126	13	59	–	44	–	7	AFP: 4× Platinum; NVPI: Gold
2008	Terra	1	4	175	55	–	–	64	43	5	AFP: 4× Platinum
2010	Fado Tradicional	2	6	–	98	–	–	–	24	—	AFP: Platinum
2015	Mundo	1	–	–	–	78	–	69	–	13	AFP: 2× Platinum
2018	Mariza	1	—	—	—	165	—	—	—	—	AFP: Platinum
2020	Mariza Canta Amália	1	—	—	—	—	—	—	—	—	

=== Live albums ===
Year	Title	Chart positions			Certifications
Year	Title	POR	FIN	US World	Certifications
2006	Concerto em Lisboa: Released: November 6, 2006	1	5	10	AFP: 5× Platinum
"—" denotes items which were not released in that country or failed to chart.

=== Singles ===
Year	Title	Chart Positions		Album
Year	Title	POR	EUR	Album
2006	"Transparente"	34	198	Transparente
2006	"Feira De Castro"	2	145	Transparente
2008	"Fado Do Encontro"	28	-	Terra
2008	"Rosa Branca"	17	-	Terra
2008	"Minh' Alma"	18	-	Terra
2011	"Chuva"	18	-	Fado Tradicional
2014	"O Tempo não pára"	7	160	Best of Mariza
2015	"Melhor de Mim"	2	192	Mundo
2018	"Quem me dera"	44	-	Mariza
2020	"A Nossa Voz"	42	-	A Nossa Voz
2024	"Desamor"	-	-	Amor

=== Featured songs ===
Year	Title	Chart Positions		Album
Year	Title	POR	EUR	Album
2017	"Livre" (Mastiksoul)	30	-	Livre

=== Year-end chart ===
Year	Title	Chart Positions
Year	Title	POR
2008	"Rosa Branca"	96
2008	"Minh' Alma"	97

=== Video albums ===
Year	Title	Charts	Certifications
Year	Title	POR	Certifications
2004	Live in London: Released: January 30, 2004	1	AFP: Platinum
2006	Concerto em Lisboa: Released: November 6, 2006	1	AFP: 5× Platinum
2008	Terra – Os Videos: Released: December 19, 2008	25	AFP: 3× Platinum
2009	Terra em Concerto: Released: February 26, 2009	2	AFP: Platinum
"—" denotes items which were not released in that country or failed to chart.
