= Mariza (album) =

Studio album by Mariza
- Released: 25 May 2018
- Genre: Fado
- Length: 53:17
- Label: Warner Music Portugal

Mariza chronology
Mundo (2015)	Mariza (2018)	Mariza canta Amália (2020)

Mariza is the seventh studio album by fado singer Mariza. It was released in 2018 by Warner Music Portugal. The album peaked at No. 1 on the Associação Fonográfica Portuguesa chart and was certified as a gold album. The album received a Latin Grammy nomination for Best Portuguese Language Roots Album in 2018.

== Track listing ==
1. Trigueirinha (Jorge Fernando) [2:39]
2. Quem Me Dera (Matias Damásio) [4:16]
3. Amor Perfeito (Héber Marques) [3:41]
4. Oração (Tiago Machado) [3:13]
5. Sou (Rochedo) (Jorge Fernando) [3:30]
6. É Mentira (Joao Vasconcelos) [2:57]
7. Semente Viva (Mario Pacheco) [3:40]
8. Por Tanto Te Amar (Diogo Clemente) [4:20]
9. Nosso Tempo (Ângelo Freire) [4:39]
10. Verde Limão (Arlindo DeCarvalho) [3:06]
11. Quebranto (Jorge Fernando) [4:14]
12. Oi Nha Mãe (Custódio Castelo) [3:56]
13. Fado Errado (Frederico de Brito) [4:25]
14. Fado Refúgio (Acácio Gomes) [3:04]
15. Trigueirinha (Jorge Fernando) [2:37]
