= Margarida Fleming =

Portuguese artist (born 1988)

- Born: Ana Margarida Fleming José; 1988; São Pedro do Sul, Viseu district, Portugal
- Known for: Painting
- Website: margaridafleming.com

Ana Margarida Fleming José (born 1988), better known as Margarida Fleming, is a self-taught Portuguese painter, street artist and illustrator.

== Early life and education ==
Fleming was born in 1988 in São Pedro do Sul in the Viseu district of central Portugal. When she was nine she won a painting competition associated with Expo '98, a World's fair which was held in Lisbon in 1998. She studied architecture and graphic design, obtaining a master's degree in architecture from the University of Beira Interior at Covilhã, with a thesis entitled "The Minimum as Housing Rehabilitation of the Alegria Neighbourhood". Alegria was a run-down neighbourhood, which she investigated for its potential to be used for student housing.

== Career ==
Fleming is now based in the Portuguese capital Lisbon. From a young age she experimented with different materials and mixing colours, without knowing much about painting. Later, she read books about artists and their techniques, which enabled her to define her creative style. As an autodidact she admits to "learning from mistakes". She paints on canvas and walls and with oil or acrylic paint. She sometimes mixes everything, liking to be constantly exploring the options.

Observations on her work include the fact that her "characters seem naked, as if the enigma of their eyes had escaped from within. At times they are haughty, defiant, focusing all attention on their facial expressions", that "she communicates powerful messages in her work and the interpretations are an excellent starting point for a discussion about what it is, then, to be a woman", and that "the strokes that build up her deeply expressionistic faces are dense, thick and with an element of unrestrained erraticness. In doing so, she breaks down the boundary between the artist and the audience, creating something that’s deeply honest and authentic".

== Street art ==
In 2019 Fleming was one of four artists invited, as members of the A Lata Delas street art project, to beautify the walls around the Entrecampos railway station in Lisbon. In her home town of São Pedro do Sul she was asked to paint a mural on a wall of a former primary school. She painted it as a tribute to the women of the municipality and to women's polyphonic singing. The mural was inaugurated in August 2022 and the inauguration was accompanied by polyphonic singing by Vozes de Manhouce. She has also done several other wall paintings in Portugal, including in Lagos in the Algarve, where she also held a residency in 2022.

== Book illustrations ==
In 2022, Fleming illustrated a bilingual anthology of poems by the Portuguese poet Florbela Espanca (1894–1930), which was published as This Sorrow that Lifts Me Up.

== Solo exhibitions ==
- 2024. Connecting, Private Space, Lisbon
- 2022. Mulher Pedra, Crack Kids Gallery, Lisbon
- 2022. Aurora. Garagem Lisboa, Lisbon
- 2019. Metamorfose, Palácio da Bolsa, Porto
- 2019. Anti-face, Artroom Gallery, Lisbon
