= Concerto em Lisboa =

Live album by Mariza
- Released: November 6, 2006
- Venue: Torre de Belém, Lisbon, Portugal
- Genre: Fado
- Length: 77:54
- Label: World Connection BV
- Producer: Jaques Morelenbaum

Mariza chronology
Transparente (2005)	Concerto em Lisboa (2006)	Terra (2008)

Concerto em Lisboa is a live album released by fado singer Mariza on November 6, 2006. It was nominated in 2007 for a Latin Grammy in the category of Best Folk Album, becoming the first Portuguese artist to receive a nomination for a Latin Grammy Award.

== Production ==
The album was released on both DVD and CD. Recorded in 2005, the concert took place in the gardens in front of Torre de Belém, in the neighborhood of Lisbon. Mariza was accompanied by an orchestra, Sinfonietta de Lisboa, conducted by Jaques Morelenbaum, the producer and arranger of her album, Transparente. The concert was attended by around 25,000 people.

== Arrangement ==
Concerto em Lisboa contains live interpretations of the songs from Transparente, and also from Mariza's first and second albums, re-arranged for orchestra—including "Medo", "Há uma música do Povo", "Meu Fado Meu', "Cavaleiro Monge", "Há Palavras Que Nos Beijam", and "Ó Gente Da Minha Terra".

Mariza said, "I lived in a traditional Lisbon neighbourhood and have always sung the fado – I know what it is, [and] I understand myself through it."

== Track listing ==
Concerto em Lisboa track listing
No.	Title	Length
1.	"Loucura"	4:41
2.	"Medo"	3:14
3.	"Maria Lisboa"	3:15
4.	"Montras"	3:41
5.	"Há Uma Música do Povo"	3:36
6.	"Barco Negro"	5:44
7.	"Menino do Bairro Negro"	4:16
8.	"Meu Fado Meu"	3:44
9.	"Duas Lágrimas de Orvalho"	3:11
10.	"Cavaleiro Monge"	5:00
11.	"Recusa"	2:33
12.	"Quando Me Sinto Só"	3:21
13.	"Há Palavras Que Nos Beijam"	3:26
14.	"Feira de Castro"	5:09
15.	"Desejos Vãos"	5:04
16.	"Primavera"	5:26
17.	"Chuva"	4:49
18.	"Ó Gente da Minha Terra" (not on all editions)	7:44
Total length:		77:54

== Certifications ==
=== Album ===
Certifications for Concerto em Lisboa
Region	Certification	Certified units/sales
Portugal (AFP)	5× Platinum	100,000^{^}
^{^} Shipments figures based on certification alone.

=== Video ===
Certifications for Concerto em Lisboa video
Region	Certification	Certified units/sales
Portugal (AFP)	5× Platinum	40,000^{^}
^{^} Shipments figures based on certification alone.
