= Lighthouse of São Miguel-o-Anjo =

Lighthouse of São Miguel-o-Anjo Farol de São Miguel-o-Anjo
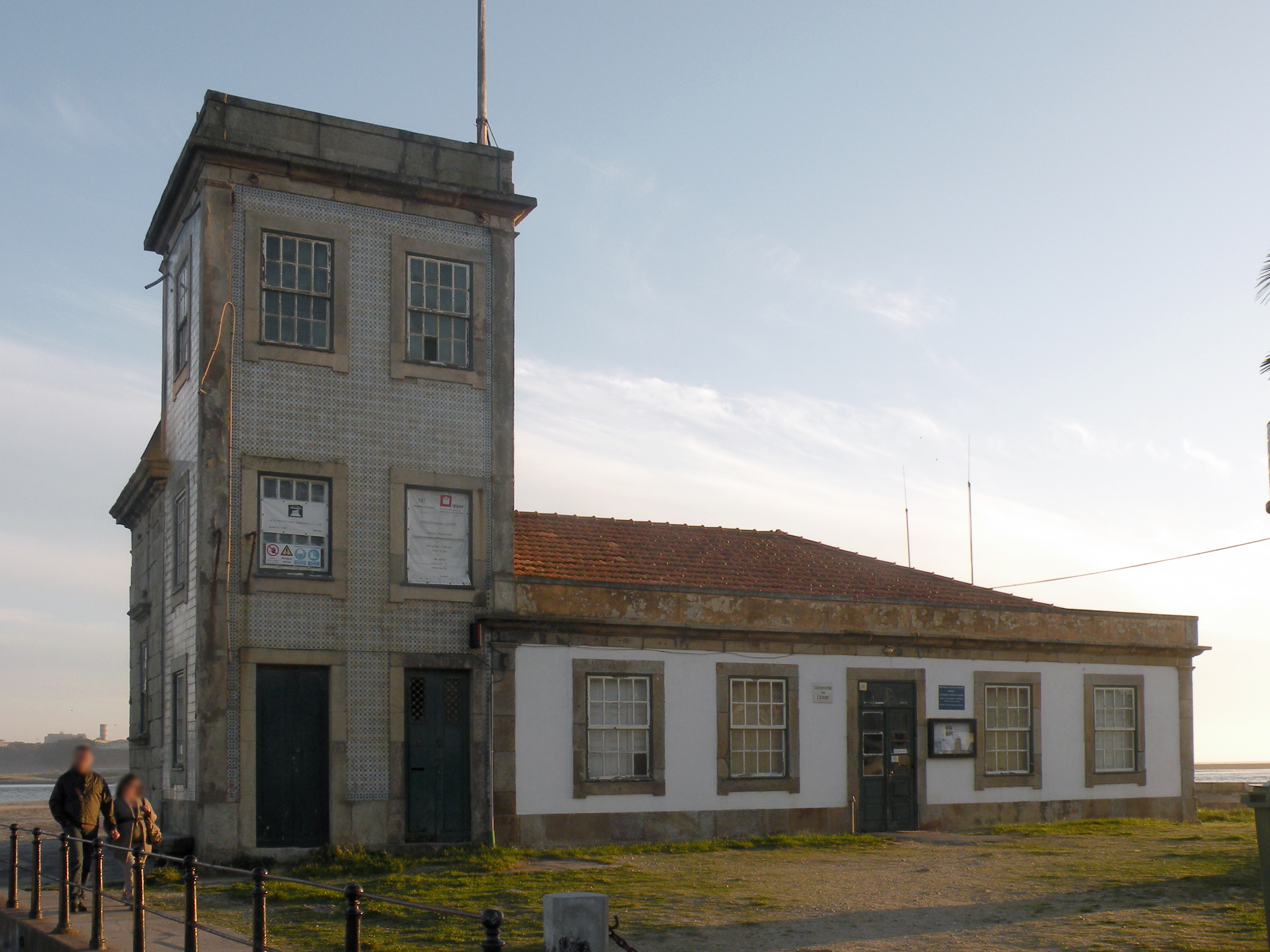
- A view of the multiuse chapel, lighthouse and fiscal guard building
- Location: Portugal Porto, Aldoar, Foz do Douro e Nevogilde
- Coordinates: 41°8′49.6″N 8°40′0.2″W

Tower
- Constructed: 1527
- Construction: Rectangular stone tower with cupola, addorsed by tower and fiscal guard building
- Height: 8 metres (26 ft)
- Shape: Square tower attached to 1-story chapel
- Markings: Unpainted tower, with sculpted relief
- Operator: Directorate for Lighthouses (Direcção de Faróis)
- Heritage: Property of Public Interest (Imóvel de Interesse Público)

Light
- Deactivated: 1882

The Lighthouse of São Miguel-o-Anjo (Portuguese: Farol de São Miguel-o-Anjo) is a former hermitage and 16th century lighthouse, in the civil parish of Aldoar, Foz do Douro e Nevogilde, municipality of Porto, in the Portuguese Norte Region. The lighthouse of São Miguel-o-Anjo is Portugal's oldest existing lighthouse and one of the oldest in Europe. Designed by Italian architect Francesco da Cremona, the project was completed in 1538.

== History ==
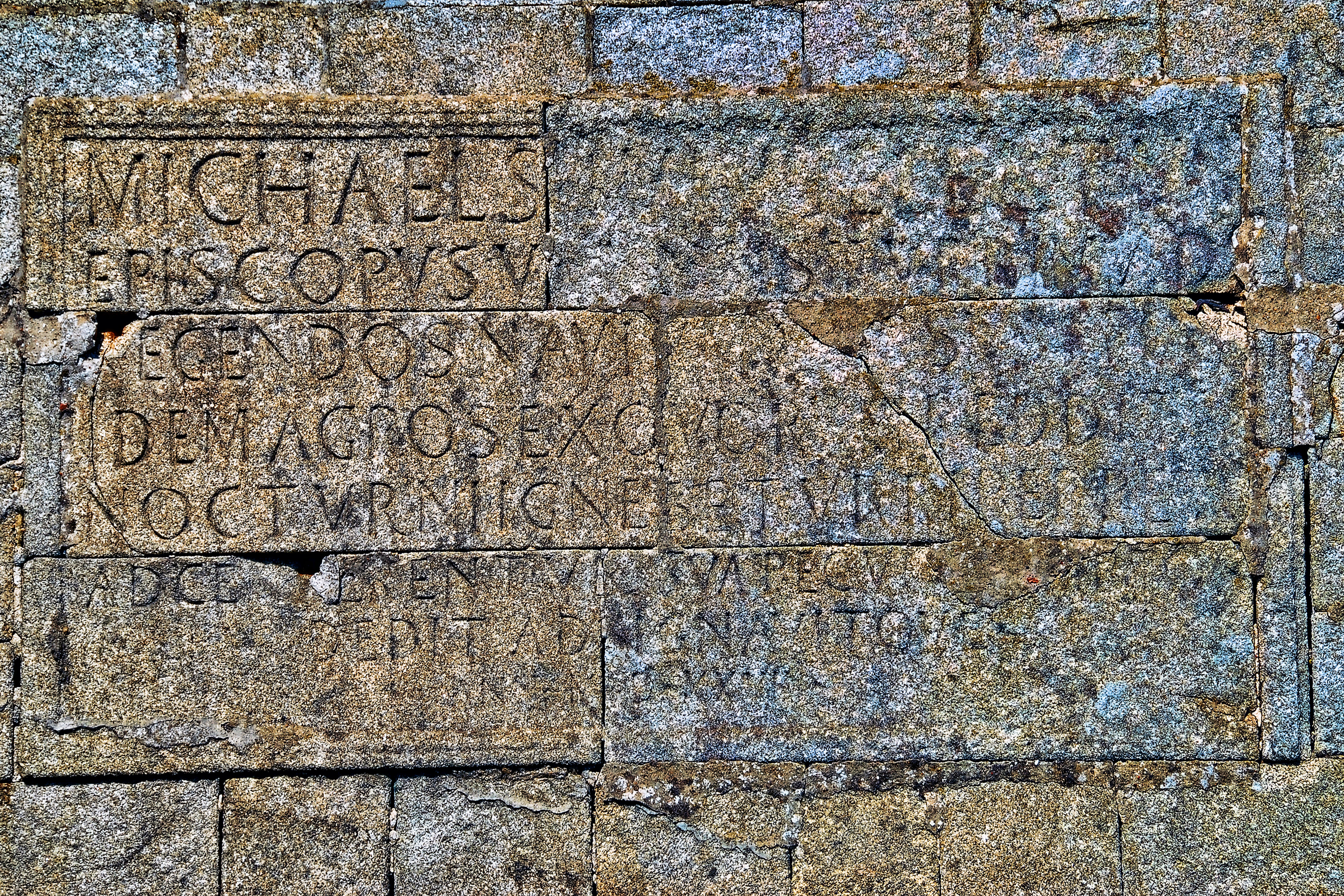
The inscription telling the story of the hermitage's construction and multi-use role

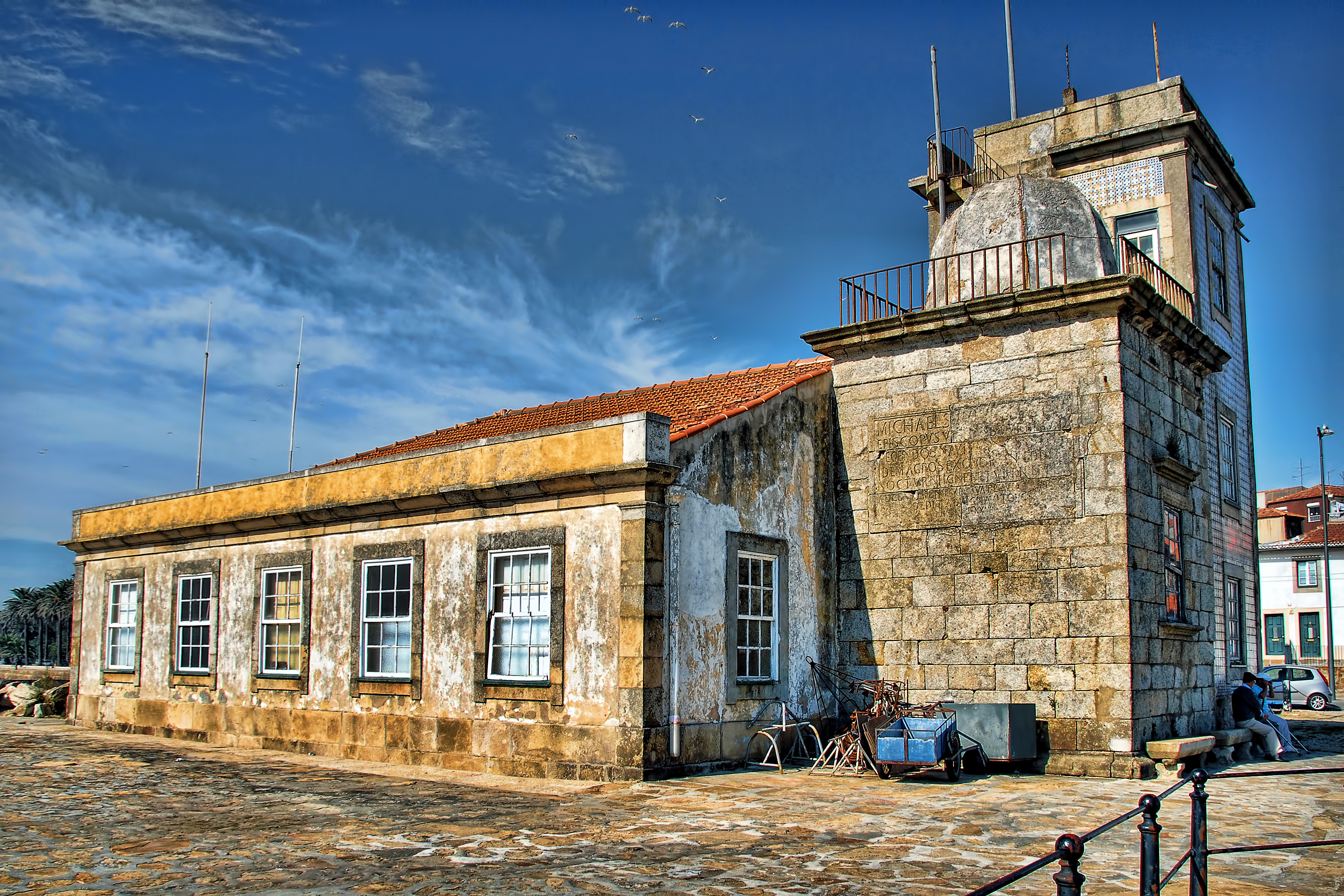
The annex building that encircles the tower constructed to house the Fiscal Guard

In 1528, D. Miguel da Silva, bishop-elect of Viseu, ordered the construction of the chapel of São Miguel-o-Anjo, which would simultaneously function as a lighthouse in order to assist navigation off the coast. The exterior wall, oriented to the river is a sculpted relief inscription:

Miguel da Silva, Bispo Eleito de Viseu, fês esta torre para governo da entrada dos navios e deu e consignou campos comprados com o seu dinheiro para que, do respectivo rendimento, se acendessem da torre fogos perpetuamente. Ano M. D. XXVIII.
Miguel da Silva, Bishop-Elect of Viseu, made this tower to govern the entrance for ships and gave and conceded purchased lands with his money to, respecting income, they light the tower with perpetual fires. Year 1528

By the beginning of the 18th century, the chapel began to operate as a conference hall for pilots working along the Barra do Douro. This project opened the area up for the construction in 1841, of an annex for the Fiscal Guard. It was decommissioned in 1882 when it was replaced by the Lighthouse of Senhora da Luz.

In the 20th century, the chapel-lighthouse functioned as a meeting hall for a contingent of the National (representing the Foz do Douro).

The property come under the control of the IPPA Instituto Português do Património Arquitetónico (forerunner of IGESPAR) on 1 June 1992, by decree 106F/92 (Diário da República, Série 1A, 126). On 15 April 2008, the DRCNorte proposed allocating the site in the Special Protection Zone (ZEP) along with the Chafariz do Passeio Alegre, Dois Obeliscos da Quinta da Prelada, Forte de São João Baptista, Igreja de São João Baptista e Zona do Passeio Alegre and revoking the ZEP for the Torre, Farol e Capela de São Miguel-o-Anjo. A similar proposal was made on 12 September 2011 to include it in the Non ædificandi of the DRCNorte.

== Architecture ==
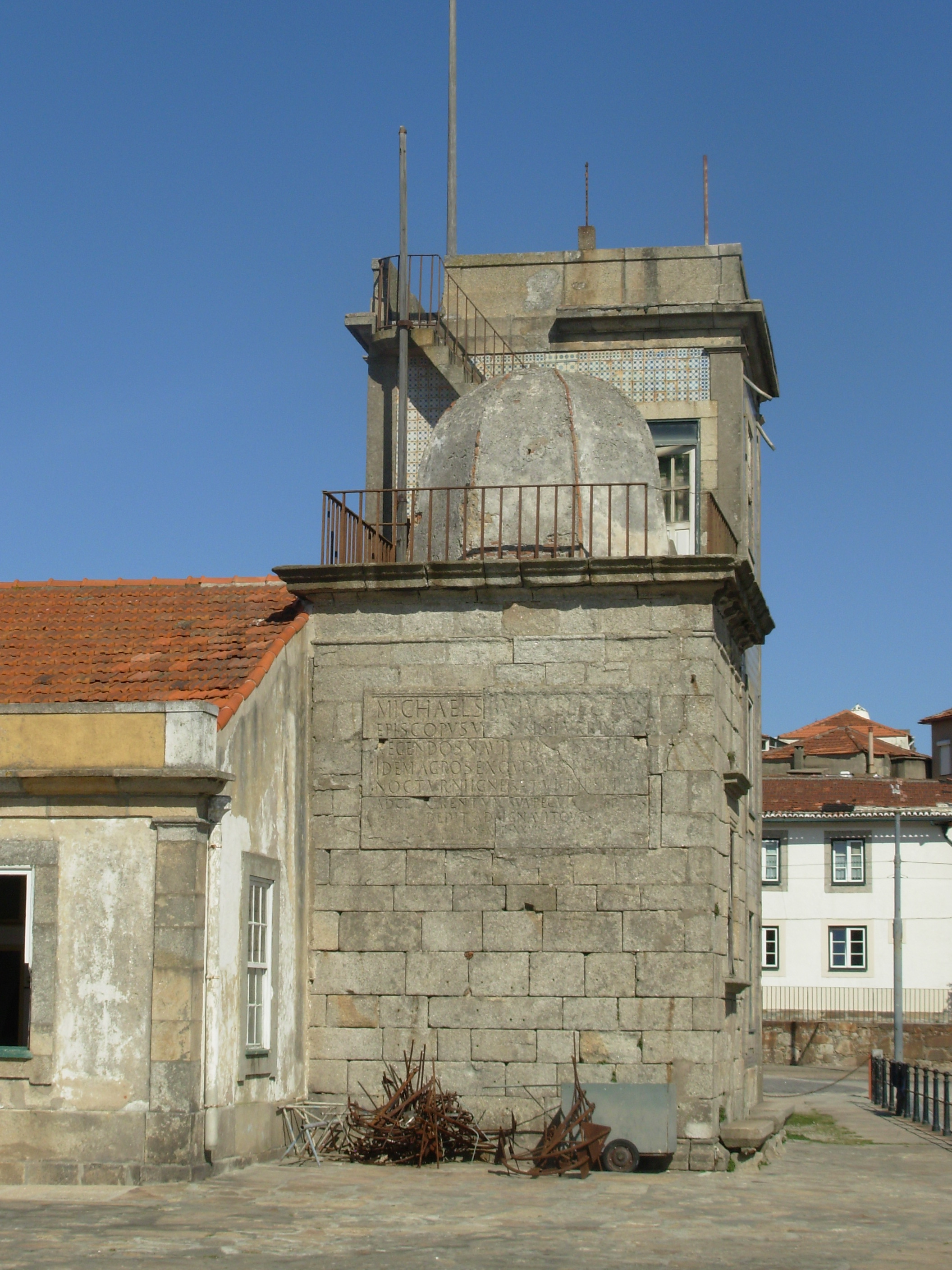
The chapel-lighthouse tower with vaulted cupola

The lighthouse structure is implanted in an urban area above the mouth of the Douro River, alongside the garden of Passeio Alegre.

The visible structure includes a rectangular tower, which had a small patio with granite guards. The interior plan is octagonal, with three niches on the wall oriented towards the river. The smaller, main tower, includes a vaulted-ceiling cupola, painted white and that includes an iron railing, that substituted a balustrade. Access to the cupola occurs through a lateral spiral staircase. Presently, the chapel-lighthouse is totally overshadowed by the lateral building, that was constructed in 1841 to serve as an outpost for the Fiscal Guard.

== See also ==
- List of lighthouses in Portugal
