= Faedo (surname) =

Faedo is a surname. Notable people with the surname include:

- Alessandro Faedo (1913–2001), Italian mathematician and politician
- Alex Faedo (born 1995), American baseball pitcher
- Lenny Faedo (born 1960), American former Major League Baseball player
- Soledad Faedo (born 1987), team handball player from Uruguay
