= Alberto Janes =

- Born: 1909
- Died: 1971 (aged 61–62)
- Occupation: Songwriter
- Known for: Many of the songs of Amália Rodrigues

Alberto Janes (1909–1971) was a Portuguese songwriter whose work included many songs recorded by Amália Rodrigues in the 1950s and 1960s.
