= Fado Tradicional =

Studio album by Mariza
- Released: 29 November 2010
- Recorded: July–September 2010
- Genre: Fado, World Music
- Length: 34:06
- Label: EMI Music Portugal, Parlophone
- Producer: Diogo Clemente

Mariza chronology
Terra (2008)	Fado Tradicional (2010)	Best of Mariza (2014)

Singles from Fado Tradicional
- 1. "Promete, Jura - Fado Sérgio"; 2. "As Meninas Dos Meus Olhos - Fado Alfacinha"

Fado Tradicional is the fifth studio album by Portuguese fado singer Mariza, released on 29 November 2010 by EMI Music Portugal. It was recorded in the Lisboa Estúdios in Portugal between July and September 2010 and produced by musician Diogo Clemente.

== Critical reception ==
Professional ratings
Review scores
Source	Rating
Blitz	4/5 stars
Financial Times	4/5 stars
The Guardian	3/5 stars
The List	5/5 stars
Público	3/5 stars
The Telegraph	4/5 stars

Fado Tradicional received positive reviews from music critics, both in Portugal and internationally.

== Commercial performance ==
Fado Tradicional was a certified platinum record in Portugal on the day of its release, for the sale of more than 20,000 copies.

== Track listing ==
Fado Tradicional – Standard edition
No.	Title	Writer(s)	Length
1.	"Fado Vianinha"	Francisco Viana	2:31
2.	"Promete, Jura - Fado Sérgio"	Maria João Dâmaso; Sérgio Dâmaso	3:53
3.	"As Meninas Dos Meus Olhos - Fado Alfacinha"	Fernando Pinto Ribeiro; Jaime Santos	2:34
4.	"Mais Uma Lua - Fado Varela"	Diogo Clemente; Reinaldo Varela	3:37
5.	"Dona Rosa - Fado Bailarico"	Fernando Pessoa; Alfredo Marceneiro	2:15
6.	"Ai Esta Pena De Mim - Fado Zé António"	Amália Rodrigues; José António Guimarães Serôdio	2:33
7.	"Na Rua Do Silêncio - Fado Alexandrino"	António Sousa Freitas; Joaquim Campos	2:48
8.	"Rosa da Madragoa - Fado Seixal"	Frederico de Brito; José Duarte	1:54
9.	"Boa Noite Solidão - Fado Carlos Da Maia"	Jorge Fernando	3:45
10.	"Desalma - Fado Alberto"	Diogo Clemente; Miguel Ramos	2:30
11.	"Meus Olhos Que Por Alguém - Fado Menor Do Porto"	António Botto; José Joaquim Cavalheiro Jr.	2:53
12.	"Promete, Jura - Fado Sérgio" (featuring Artur Batalha)	Maria João Dâmaso; Sérgio Dâmaso	2:53
Total length:			34:06

Fado Tradicional – Special edition
No.	Title	Writer(s)	Length
13.	"Olhos Da Cor Do Mar - Fado Amora"	João Ferreira-Rosa; Óscar Alves; Joaquim Campos	2:10
14.	"Lavava No Rio, Lavava"	Amália Rodrigues; Fontes Rocha	3:55
Total length:			40:21

== Personnel ==
The following people are credited on the album:

Instruments

- Ângelo Freire – portuguese guitar
- Diogo Clemente – fado viola
- José Marino de Freitas – bass viola
