= David Mourão-Ferreira =

Portuguese writer and poet (1927–1996)

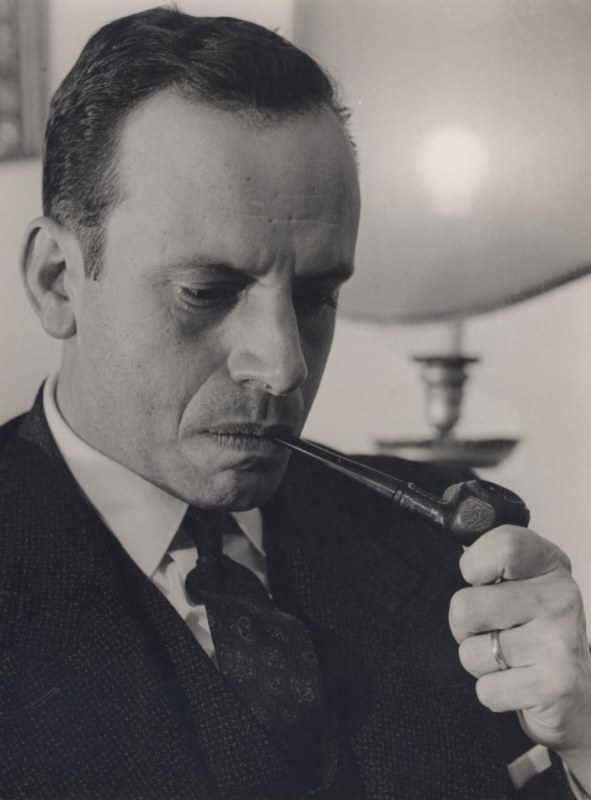
- Mourão-Ferreira in 1961
- Born: David de Jesus Mourão-Ferreira; 24 February 1927; Lisbon, Portugal
- Died: 16 June 1996 (aged 69)
- Occupation: Writer
- Years active: 1954–1987

David de Jesus Mourão-Ferreira, GCSE (24 February 1927 in Lisbon – 16 June 1996 in Lisbon) was a Portuguese writer and poet from Lisbon.

He was a son of David Ferreira (b. 1898) and wife Teresa de Jesus Ferro Mourão (b. 1907). He studied Romanic Philology in 1951 at the University of Lisbon and in 1957 became a Professor.

He married firstly Maria Eulália Barbosa Valentim de Carvalho, sister of Rui Valentim de Carvalho, of now EMI-Valentim de Carvalho label, and maternal aunt of Manuela Moura Guedes' first husband, by whom he had issue, and secondly Maria do Pilar de Jesus Barata, without issue.

In 2005, the University of Bari and the Instituto Camões dedicated to him the Cátedra David Mourão-Ferreira

== Poems ==
- 1954 – Tempestade de Verão (awarded by Delfim Guimarães)
- 1958 – Os Quatro Cantos do Tempo
- 1962 – In Memoriam Memoriae
- 1962 – Infinito Pessoal ou A Arte de Amar
- 1966 – Do Tempo ao Coração (Of The Time to The Heart)
- 1967 – A Arte de Amar (combination of previous works)
- 1969 – Lira de Bolso
- 1971 – Cancioneiro de Natal (awarded by Nacional de Poesia)
- 1973 – Matura Idadeaa
- 1974 – Sonetos do Cativo (Captive Sonnets)
- 1976 – As Lições do Fogo
- 1980 – Obra Poética (Poetic Works) (includes a guitar and a violin)
- 1985 – Os Ramos e os Remos
- 1988 – Obra Poética, 1948-1988 (Poetic Works, 1948–1988)
- 1994 – Música de Cama (erotic anthology with an unedited book)

== Narrative fictions ==
- 1959 – Novelas de Gaivotas em Terra (awarded by Ricardo Malheiros)
- 1968 – Os contos de Os Amantes (The Stories of the Loved Ones)
- 1980 – As Quatro Estações (awarded by the International Association of Literary Critics)
- 1986 – Um Amor Feliz (A Happy Love)
- 1987 – Duas Histórias de Lisboa (Two Histories of Lisbon)

== See also ==
- Instituto Camões
