= Florbela Espanca =

Portuguese poet (1894–1930)

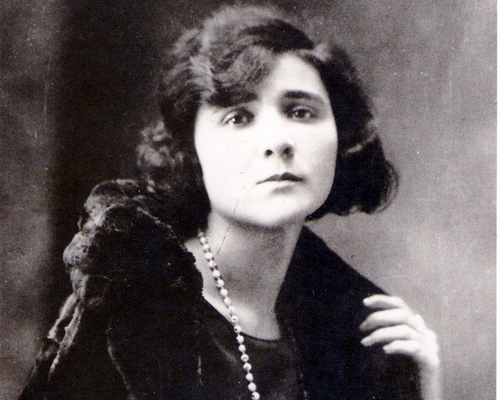
- Born: Flor Bela d'Alma da Conceição; 8 December 1894; Vila Viçosa, Portugal
- Died: 8 December 1930 (aged 36); Matosinhos, Portugal
- Occupation: Poet
- Writing career
- Period: 1903–1930
- Genres: Parnassianism, Symbolism

Florbela Espanca (Portuguese: [floɾˈβɛlɐ ɨʃˈpɐ̃kɐ]; born Flor Bela d'Alma da Conceição, 8 December 1894 – 8 December 1930) was a Portuguese poet. She is known for her passionate and feminist poetry. Fernando Pessoa later said she was his "twin soul".

== Early life ==
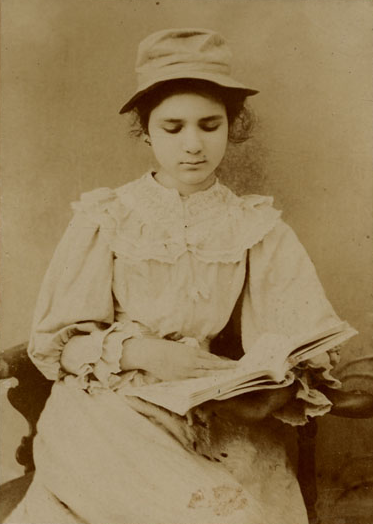
Florbela Espanca in 1910

Born Flor Bela d'Alma da Conceição on 8 December 1894 in Vila Viçosa, Portugal, Espanca was the daughter of Antónia da Conceição Lobo who worked as a housemaid for Espanca's father, João Maria Espanca, a photographer and businessman. Her father's wife, Mariana do Carmo Inglesa Espanca, who was unable to have her own children, agreed for Espanca to live in their home, where she was raised from birth by both her father's wife and her biological mother, who was 15 years old when Espanca was born. Since her parents weren't married, when Espanca was baptized on 20 June 1895, she was christened as Flor Bela Lobo, the daughter of Antónia Lobo and an unknown father. Her father, whom Espanca referred to in a poem as "dear Daddy of my soul", officially claimed paternity in 1949, 19 years after Espanca's death.

Espanca's full brother, Apeles Espanca, was born in 1897 and was also baptized as the child of an unknown father. In 1903, Espanca wrote her earliest known poem, "A Vida e a Morte" (Life and Death), when she was 8 years old. In 1908, her mother died at the age of 29 with "neurosis" recorded as her official cause of death. A few months after her mother's death, Espanca became one of the first female students to enroll in the Liceu André de Gouveia, a traditionally male school in Évora, Portugal.

== Later life and career ==
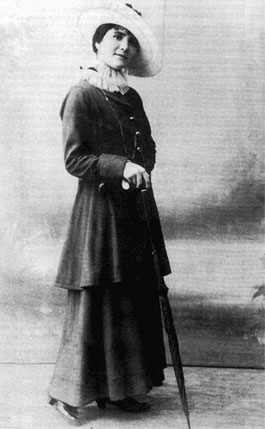
Florbela Espanca.

In 1913, Espanca failed a final examination and dropped out of school, and on her 19th birthday, she married Alberto Moutinho, a longtime friend and classmate. Espanca and Moutinho moved to Redondo, Portugal, where they both worked as teachers. Espanca taught French, English, geography, and history and Moutinho taught science. In 1915, due to financial difficulties, they moved in with Espanca's father in Évora and continued teaching. From 1915 to 1917, she collected all of her poems into a work entitled O livro D'ele (His book) that she dedicated to her brother.

In 1916, Espanca re-enrolled in secondary school at the Liceu de Évora. After graduating in 1917, she and Moutinho moved to Lisbon so Espanca could attend the University of Lisbon, where she was one of seven women, out of a total of 313 students, enrolled in the School of Law. Six months later, Espanca had a miscarriage and took a temporary break from university in order to recover in the southern region of Algarve, away from the capital city of Lisbon. She had another miscarriage in 1919 and around the same time, Espanca began to show the first serious symptoms of mental illness. Later that same year, Livro de Mágoas (The Book of Sorrows) was published. In 1921 Espanca and Moutinho divorced, which exposed her to significant social prejudice.

She was remarried in 1922 to António Guimarães. Espanca had another miscarriage in 1923 and Guimarães filed for divorce a few months later. Livro de Soror Saudade (Sister Saudade's Book) was published the same year. In 1925 she was married for a third time to Mário Lage, a doctor who had treated her for a long time. In the sonnet, "Amar" (Love), which was published in her last book, Charneca em Flor (Heath in Bloom), Espanca expressed a "consuming desire to satisfy her need to love freely as a woman and her inability to channel that love into a socially acceptable, exclusive, monogamous mode," which according to Thomas Braga, was a revolutionary statement for Portuguese love sonnets.

Espanca's brother died in an airplane accident (some believe he committed suicide, due to his fiancée's death), which deeply affected her. His death inspired the writing of As Máscaras do Destino (The Masks of Destiny). After being diagnosed with pulmonary edema, Espanca starting keeping a diary and twice attempted suicide shortly before the completion of Charneca em Flor.

== Death and posthumous publications ==
Espanca died by suicide on 8 December 1930, her 36th birthday, from an overdose of barbiturates. Charneca em Flor was published a month later in January 1931. In 1931, Reliquiare, a title given by the Italian professor Guido Battelli, was published with the poems she wrote on a further version of Charneca em Flor. A bilingual anthology of poems by Espanca was published as This Sorrow that Lifts Me Up in 2022, with translations by Simon Park and illustrations by Margarida Fleming.
