= Mariana Callejas =

Chilean writer

- Callejas in 1978
- Born: Mariana Inés Callejas Honores; 11 April 1932; Monte Patria, Chile
- Died: 10 August 2016 (aged 84); Santiago, Chile
- Other names: Anat, Mariana Earnest, Ana Luisa Pizarro, María Luisa Pizarro
- Occupations: Writer, DINA agent
- Spouses: Allan Earnest; Michael Townley

Mariana Inés Callejas Honores (11 April 1932 – 10 August 2016) was a Chilean writer and member of the Dirección de Inteligencia Nacional (DINA) who participated in several terrorist attacks, including the murder of General Carlos Prats and his wife, which was perpetrated in 1974 in Buenos Aires. She was convicted and sentenced to 20 years in prison by courts of the first and second instances, though her term was later reduced to five years.

== Early life ==
Mariana Callejas was born into a middle-class family. Very early on she became interested in serious literature, claiming to have read Dostoyevsky's Crime and Punishment at age eight.

Her life changed dramatically at age 18 – she secretly left school after her favorite teachers, the Feinsilbert couple, were thrown out. Influenced by this couple, she turned to Socialist Zionism and planned to emigrate to Israel. In order to fulfill her plan, she married a young man. One day, she told her mother about her school desertion, her marriage, and her conversion. The reaction was unexpected; her father cut her out of their life. Things got worse when soon after, Pablo, her new husband, decided to marry a classmate, and his family obtained an annulment of the marriage with Mariana. Then, thanks to the Feinsilberts' connections, she took a ship bound for Israel.

On the first kibbutz where Callejas lived, Nan Kissuphim (probably the current Kissufim), besides working, she studied Hebrew in special classes. From this kibbutz she passed to another, formed by emigrants from North and South America, in the Negev desert. Located near the border, they had to build it from scratch. Due to the danger of attacks from Egyptian and Bedouin soldiers, she had to stand night watches. There she adopted the name of Anat, because it seemed to her that Inés and Mariana sounded too Catholic.

Her first and ephemeral marriage of convenience was soon followed by a second, this time to feel protected in an environment where there were four men for every woman. She chose an American agriculture student, Allan Earnest, an idealist who had emigrated to Israel from Cornell University.

The couple left the kibbutz shortly afterward, along with a score of other residents, due to ideological differences. They settled on a moshav, where it was allowed to own a home, as well as other manifestations of individualism.

In 1952 Allan was called up, but as a pacifist, he did not want to serve in the army. In addition, he was still recovering from the injuries he had suffered when a mine exploded under his tractor. Given this situation, Allan and Anat decided to embark with their young son on a ship bound for Chile.

There, as expected, they were not well received by her father, and soon they took another ship, bound for New York City.

In the United States, they shared an apartment with Allan's mother in Washington Heights. Mariana Earnest escaped during the day to attend acting classes at different schools. At that time she dreamed of theater and also began to write stories.

The couple moved to Uniondale, a suburb of Long Island, in 1957, when they already had three small children. There she had a short experience as a waitress at the Italian restaurant Tony's, which she hated, as she also hated being a housewife. Three years later, unable to take any more, she took her three children and returned to Chile.

== Callejas and Townley ==
Callejas arrived at the doors of a maternity home in 1960 with the children; she would not let anyone tell her to go back to her husband or the United States.

She continued to write stories and soon became friends with a group of bohemian artists. Going to wait for one of them when leaving a party, she met Michael Townley. That same year, Townley, at seventeen, fell madly in love with her, and despite the difference in age, courted her until she agreed to marry him.

Their marriage was celebrated on 22 July 1961. None of their parents attended the wedding. Not only the Callejas were against it; Townley's father, who worked at Ford Chile, had been promoted to Venezuela and had left the country with his wife and two other children. Michael had refused to leave and had remained in Santiago, determined to conquer Mariana.

To make a living, Michael sold Collier's Encyclopedia to wealthy families who knew English, and fixed cars and electrical appliances. Three years later, in 1964, thanks to his father, he got a job with Ford in Peru, but he failed and four months later he left Lima.

In 1965 luck smiled on him and he became the representative of the mutual fund Investors Overseas Services (IOS). This allowed him to move with Callejas and the children to a good house in La Reina, with two employees. The couple enjoyed skiing, and Townley participated in car races.

The next year, Townley's father was promoted again, and was preparing to return to Santiago as president of Ford Chile. Michael, now successful, hoped to make peace with the family, but everything fell apart when rumors of the imminent bankruptcy of IOS arose because one of its directors, Bernard Cornfeld, had stolen millions of dollars. Michael's clients, in a panic, begin to harass him and he was forced to flee to the United States.

Mariana followed shortly afterward with her children, but only after obtaining the promise that they would return to Chile as soon as possible. First they settled in the house of Michael's grandparents in Pompano Beach (where he tried to sell Fords, without success), and then in Miami's Little Havana, to work at an AAMCO Transmissions shop.

Nothing in their lives yet indicated that the couple would become terrorist agents. Mariana began to attend a literary workshop at the University of Miami, joined marches called by the New Party, a group where her new friends were active and that, among other things, proposed the legalization of abortion and marijuana, opposed the Vietnam War, and supported the poet and senator Eugene McCarthy for president. However, it was also anti-communist. Townley, on the other hand, was not interested in literature or even politics; he worked as a mechanic and remained a fan of car racing.

Our house in Miami was not luxurious; it was relatively modest, but we had a yacht and a very cute dog. Many Chileans came to visit us, flocks of Chileans; I do not know how the data was passed and they stayed on mattresses in the garage. We used to go out on a yacht and we had a great time, but all that vanished when the ugly things happened.

— Maria Callejas

When Salvador Allende won the 1970 presidential elections, Callejas decided to return to Chile, which she did despite the opposition of her husband, who did not want to leave his business for the economic uncertainty in Santiago. There were fights, Michael had a romantic affair in the United States, he considered getting divorced, there were comings and goings, but finally the crisis was overcome and the couple saw each other again in Chile.

An anti-Allendist, Callejas made contacts with Fatherland and Liberty (Spanish: Patria y Libertad), while Michael tried, with little success, to conduct business. Urged by his wife to join her new right-wing friends, Michael said he had to work and characterized their actions as those of children and their Molotov cocktails as primitive. A few weeks later, Michael agreed to make an authentic Molotov bomb. Thus began his collaboration with the Chilean extreme right, in whose circles he would be known as Juan Manolo. His biggest success was the clandestine radio that he managed to manufacture and with which he transmitted anti-Allendist messages.

After participating in an operation to eliminate interference that prevented transmissions of the conservative Channel 5 of Concepción, a dependent of the Catholic University, "whose position was of decided opposition to the government of Allende", which ended with the death of a worker, Townley was forced to flee. He arrived in Miami, with empty pockets, on 2 April 1973. Callejas followed him later, in June, with the children.

Upon his return, Townley contacted the CIA again to offer his services (he had already done so in 1970, before going to Chile), conspired with the Cubans who worked at AAMCO and tried to aid Fatherland and Liberty from Miami.

== Agents of the DINA ==
The 1973 Chilean coup d'état, led by General Augusto Pinochet, allowed Callejas and Townley to return to Chile. Mariana took the first flight to Santiago after the coup, while Michael put his affairs in order so that he could leave with the children. The CIA had not contacted him, and, even though his wife assured him that he was not in any danger, he worried about the charges against him in Chile. He decided to travel under a false name, that of his friend Kenneth Enyart, who gave him his birth certificate and social security card, documents with which he obtained a passport.

It was Colonel Pedro Espinoza, who, upon learning of Townley's work for Fatherland and Liberty, invited him to join the military dictatorship's secret police, the Dirección de Inteligencia Nacional (DINA). Michael did so under the name Andrés Wilson; Mariana joined as Ana Luisa Pizarro.

In his novel Las cenizas del Cóndor, the Uruguayan Fernando Butazzoni tells how Callejas and Townley, along with their two small children, went with Colonel Espinoza to San Cristóbal Hill in Santiago, to test at a distance the detonators from the bomb that would eventually end the life of General Carlos Prats.

Callejas would try to justify herself years later by saying that they were going through a bad time and that they needed money to support the family. But Taylor Branch and Eugene M. Propper affirm in their book devoted to the assassination of Orlando Letelier, Labyrinth, that both agreed to work for the DINA with pleasure, and that they considered it an honor.

In addition to participating in the 1974 attack in Buenos Aires that ended the life of Prats, Callejas accompanied her husband on other missions, particularly one in Mexico the following year.

Callejas traveled, under her DINA alias, to Mexico City in early 1975 on a mission to eliminate opponents of Pinochet. Among the objectives were Allende's widow Hortensia Bussi, the socialist Carlos Altamirano, and the communist Volodia Teitelboim, but the mission turned out to be a complete fiasco. They did not hit their targets, and almost exploded the mobile home in which they were traveling with Virgilio Paz, an anti-Castro Cuban.

She also accompanied Townley in the operation to assassinate Orlando Letelier and his secretary Roni Moffit on 21 September 1976 in Washington. It would be for this crime that Townley would fall into the hands of American justice. He was handed over in Chile in April 1978 and taken out of the country by FBI agents. This also ended the idyll of Callejas with the military junta.

In a U.S. Department of Justice affidavit from August 1991, U.S. Justice Department attorney Eric B. Marcy noted that between the years 1982 and 1990, she provided numerous "confession letters" which “were prepared by Townley prior to his expulsion from Chile in order to protect him from the fugitives Manuel Contreras and Pedro Espinoza and to protect his expulsion from Chile.” In a letter from March 1978, her husband wrote that their DINA missions were carried out by "following orders from Gen. Contreras."

== House in Lo Curro: torture and literature ==
Shortly after the 1973 coup, the DINA turned over a mansion – three floors, almost 1,000 square meters of building and 5,000 square meters of land – to Michael Townley and his wife Mariana Callejas. The large house, delivered in recognition of the services provided by the couple to the secret police of the dictatorship, was located in the upper part of Santiago, in Lo Curro, Via Naranja 4925.

A voluminous mass of cubic concrete, rather ugly, with something of an orphanage, hospital, or other public building.

— Carlos Iturra, Caída en desgracia

Legally it was not theirs; it had been acquired by then-Army Major Raúl Iturriaga and a DINA lawyer who died in strange circumstances in 1976, under a false identity. The idea was for it to serve as a home for married agents and their children, and at the same time, for the Quepulillán barracks to operate there, from which terrorist operations abroad would be planned.

This barracks had two permanent agents, who served as drivers and assistants, and a secretary, who kept the accounts and assisted the proprietor with administrative tasks. In addition, the team included a gardener, a cook, and two chemists: Francisco Oyarzún and Eugenio Berríos, alias Hermes. The latter spent their days locked in a laboratory, experimenting with the effectiveness of sarin gas on mice and rabbits as part of the so-called Project Andrea.

On the second floor were the Townley workshops, where they performed radio and telephone interceptions, in addition to designing electronic detonators. There they also made the 119 false passports that served to cover the deaths of the same number of Chileans killed by the DINA in Chile. As part of the so-called Operation Colombo, it was made to appear that these Chileans had been executed by their own colleagues in Argentina and Brazil in 1975.

Several terrorists from the right also stayed there, such as the neo-fascists led by Stefano Delle Chiaie and Cuban exiles from Operation 40.

This house, where the Spanish-Chilean diplomat Carmelo Soria and others were tortured and murdered, was also the headquarters of a popular literary workshop led by Callejas.

Callejas, on returning to Chile, began to frequent the literary workshop of Enrique Lafourcade, which was held at the National Library in Santiago and was attended by writers who would later form the New Chilean Narrative.

"Do you know Bobby Ackermann?" is one of the stories that Callejas wrote and that favorably impressed Lafourcade and the other members of the workshop. With this monologue of a veteran Jewish tailor, she won El Mercurio's Rafael Maluenda short story competition.

At the beginning of her attendance at the Lafourcade workshop, Townley used to pick her up by car, and many times they dropped off the writer at home, thus gaining his trust. Lafourcade not only stimulated her writing, but also sometimes influenced her to publish it. Thanks to him, she was also able to participate in the lunch that Chilean writers shared with Jorge Luis Borges in 1976.

Callejas considered that this workshop was not enough, so she decided to organize one in her house to which she invited not only young people who attended the Lafourcade workshop, but also recognized writers like the latter. It once included Nicanor Parra and others.

...there were several intellectuals and artists who came to the Lo Curro house as visitors. One of them was Nicanor Parra, who arrived through Lafourcade. It was the 18 September festival of 1976 and for some reason – "surely drunk" – the antipoet became embroiled in a loud discussion with a painter named Cisternas. "They were going to come to blows, but they were separated. Enrique (Lafourcade) got winged by the painter and said "You have to get this man out of here; what are you thinking, you are the owner of the house." So I was the one who formally asked the painter to leave.

— Mariana Callejas

Gonzalo Contreras says about that workshop (which met until 1978):

We were dopes and she was waiting for us with some trays of steak, cartons of cigarettes, bottles of pisco. In a way, she had organized the workshop for herself, being the one who read the most and was most prolific. Every class she had a text, while it took me two months to write a story. I respected her at first because she won a prize from El Mercurio with a story called "Do you know Bobby Ackermann?", which I remember being quite good.

Contreras and Carlos Franz – who maintains that Callejas "wrote good stories" – arrived by bus at a bridge where Townley himself was waiting for them in a small car, and in the night, before the curfew, an employee took them back to the stop. "He showed up wearing a sour expression on his face that I can't explain to you. He would not open his mouth, that motherfucker. I felt that he detested us and that he detested this side of her."

To Franz, the opportunity he had, "so young, to know the traps, the false floors, and double personalities generated by a dictatorship", he "has made much of a great literary opportunity." "I have already written three novels, originated in part from these stimuli," he admitted in 2008.

Carlos Iturra is the only writer who did not repudiate her and who is still her friend. Iturra affirms that Callejas is "a great writer", says that he "would be very honored" to take charge of the unpublished works she produces, and predicts that "after death she will be read avidly."

Cristián Aiguader – son of Jaume Aiguader, former mayor of Barcelona, minister of the Second Republic and one of the founders of the Republican Left – who arrived in Chile after the Spanish Civil War and prospered in Santiago as a trader and man linked to culture, describes Callejas in his book Lucha inconclusa: memorias de un catalán exiliado a Chile as the author of "some stories of heavy psychological weight." One of them referred to the capture of an opponent of the dictatorship: "The description was so realistic and with such a wealth of detail that, although this may not be unusual in a great writer, it seemed to be something lived."

Mariana Callejas published La noche larga in 1980, a book of stories with a black cover, in whose upper right corner there is a green eye behind bars. In some of these stories, she describes torture sessions and how C-4 bombs were made.

We have two kilos of C-4 for this job. You see how important it is. Two kilos for the gentleman. It cannot fail. But you have to do the clockmaking work yourself, otherwise the danger is tremendous, you know. But what's going on with the machine guns, says Max, if the man lives as calm and regular a life as you say he does, they can give it to him when he leaves his house as usual. No, Max, they say, what we are looking for is the psychological effect. A shooting is a shooting, and people are used to them. It has to be something grand, so that others learn from his example, so the enemies learn.

— "Un parque pequeño y alegre", story by Mariana Callejas

In that story, Callejas redeems Max, the murderer, and shows him to be sensitive, reading Walt Whitman and being touched when he sees a dead bird next to a statue.

That same year she received a mention at the Andrés Bello Novel Prize for Los puentes and the following, in 1981, she won the La Bicicleta story contest – the jury was composed of Jorge Edwards, Martín Cerda, Marco Antonio de la Parra, and the editor of the magazine – with Jess Abraham Jones. This provoked a negative reaction both from readers and a group of artists and intellectuals, who wrote a letter of protest, reproduced in issue No. 17. The magazine explained that the award went to the story not its author, and that, furthermore, writers had entered the contest under pseudonyms, and so their identities were not known until after the judging.

Anthay Lipthay, one of Callejas's lovers and a fellow DINA agent, described her as an "extraordinarily intelligent and skillful woman." "She liked to relate intimate details of her experiences on the kibbutz, customs, obligations, equality between the sexes, liberality in erotic manifestations. And in this last detail, I remember that Mariana was pleased to abound in images and even evoke some of her own experiences," Lipthay said in a judicial statement.

== Trial and sentencing ==
Mariana Callejas was accused of being the co-perpetrator of the murder of General Prats and member of a conspiracy. According to the head of the DINA, Manuel Contreras, it would have been she who pressed the button of the bomb that killed the general and his wife, Sofía Cuthbert, in Buenos Aires on 30 September 1974. This was confirmed by her ex-husband, Michael Townley, who specified that Callejas made a first attempt to detonate the explosive device, but could not blow it up, and that the device was then activated by him. These statements were made by Townley in 1999, in Washington, and at that time he asked that his testimony not be used against Callejas. But according to the Argentine judge María Romilda Servini, the role played by the former in the attack "was affirmed by other records."

Servini requested the extradition of Callejas, as a result of which she was arrested on 17 July 2003 and placed under house arrest after being interrogated for more than three hours by the Supreme Court minister. But after a few days, on 22 July, she was granted provisional liberty.

Alejandro Solís, the visiting minister who was investigating the Prats case, tried Callejas on 1 September 2003 together with former DINA official Christoph Willeke Flöel as the perpetrators of the double murder of General Carlos Prats and his wife. Callejas was detained that same day at the Women's Orientation Center, where she would remain for nine months.

In July 2005, the Chilean judiciary rejected the request made two years earlier by Judge Servini to extradite Callejas.

After establishing during the trial in Chile that in September 1974 Callejas had traveled to Buenos Aires with Townley to kill Prats by means of a remote-controlled bomb, she was sentenced on 30 June 2008 to 20 years in prison in the court of first instance, a sentence confirmed by the Court of Appeals in January 2009.

In 2010, the Supreme Court annulled the 20-year sentence handed down by the first and second instances, bestowing on Callejas a sentence of only five years and without imprisonment.

Mariana Callejas died on 10 August 2016, at age 84, in a nursing home in the Santiago commune of Las Condes.

== In film and literature ==
In 2008 the Uruguayan director Esteban Schroeder premiered the film Matar a todos, inspired by the life of Mariana Callejas, who is played by Chilean actress María Izquierdo. Izquierdo related that she reviewed all of the available bibliography of Callejas, and with that knowledge, had total freedom to compose the character.

It is written from a strange limbo where I am based on her but I had full freedom to interpret her from the paper [...] The intensity that this approach brought to certain degrees of madness and distortion was not something easy to represent [...] We filmed in only one day, and the whole first part until 2 o'clock in the afternoon, we did not breathe, and after lunch, I could not imitate myself [...] The feeling overpowers you too; it's super intense ... Imagine, how you can survive that role? To herself she's a heroine; she's the best of them all.

The workshop and what happened at her home in Lo Curro – literary evenings in parallel with the detention and torture in her basement – has led to the writing of several texts: the chronicle Las orquídeas negras de Mariana Callejas by Pedro Lemebel (included in his book De perlas y cicatrices, LOM, Santiago, 1998); a part of the novel By Night in Chile by Roberto Bolaño; the story "Caída en desgracia" by Carlos Iturra (part of the volume Crimen y castigo, Catalonia, Santiago, 2008). El taller, the actress and director Nona Fernández's first play, which premiered in 2012, was about Callejas's literary salon and its disturbing intersection with political torture and assassination.
