= Raúl Iturriaga =

Chilean army general and economist (born 1938)

- Born: Raúl Eduardo Iturriaga Neumann; 23 January 1938 (age 88)
- Alma mater: School of the Americas; University of Chile
- Spouse: Mireya Baeza (divorced)
- Children: 3
- Military career
- Allegiance: Chilean
- Branch: Army
- Service years: 1957–1991
- Rank: General
- Nicknames: "Don Elías" "Luis Gutiérrez" "El Chico"
- Unit: Member of the Foreign Affairs Department of the DINA
- Commands: Purén Brigade from DINA

Raúl Eduardo Iturriaga Neumann (born 23 January 1938) is a Chilean Army general and a former member of the Foreign Affairs Department of the DINA — the Chilean secret police under Augusto Pinochet's military dictatorship — as an analyst and in the agency's socio-economic intelligence unit, the "Purén Brigade".

Between 1975 and 1977, he studied a postgraduate degree in economics at the University of Chile, in 1981 he was Chile's military attaché in France, later serving as governor of the province of Valdivia and then of Parinacota. In 1991, he retired from the Army.

In June 2007, Iturriaga went into hiding to escape a 10-year prison sentence handed down by judge Alejandro Solís (reduced to five years by the Chilean Supreme Court) for the forced disappearance of Revolutionary Left Movement member Luis San Martín. He was finally captured in August 2007 in Viña del Mar.

== Life and career ==
Iturriaga was born 23 January 1938 in Chile to Jorge Iturriaga and Amelia Neumann.

In 1965, he studied at the School of the Americas in Panama, as did José Octavio Zara Holger, Alfredo Canales Taricco, Miguel Krassnoff. Raúl Iturriaga became a counter-insurgency instructor after taking courses with his future chief, Manuel Contreras, in Fort Gulick, an installation of the United States Department of Defense School of the Americas based in the Panama Canal where he also learned parachuting, a discipline in its infancy in Chile at the time. He also received special forces training in insurgency and counterinsurgency, jump chief, parachute packing and maintenance, tactical diver, frogman-parachutist, military free jump and jungle survival. In the same year the Army Parachute Battalion was founded. Iturriaga attended a special military course again in 1976. He took the Urban Counterinsurgency Course in 1974.

He joined the DINA in November 1973, when he was the second commander of black berets in Peldehue, less than three months after the coup against Salvador Allende. First responsible for the Department of Exterior Affairs of the DINA, he was named head of the Brigada Purén, based in the Villa Grimaldi torture complex, in December 1975.

He was first appointed in mid-1974 as head of the intelligence directorate called "Purén Brigade" (unit in charge of intelligence in the economic-social field of action), whose center of operations was Villa Grimaldi. Then, at the beginning of 1975, as a staff officer, he was called by the Director of National Intelligence to work as an analyst in the Foreign Affairs Department of the DINA for three months, which was in charge of reviewing foreign representations in Chile, such as embassies, consulates and international organizations. Like all the other departments that made up the DINA headquarters, the department was not operational, which is why it lacked operational units or brigades that depended on it. In mid-1975, he again became head of the Purén Unit, where he had Gerardo Urrich and Manuel Carevic under his command.

Between the end of 1975 and March 1977, Raúl Eduardo Iturriaga Neumann was in a period of transition in his career. During this time, he did not belong to DINA, as he was studying for a graduate degree in economics at the Latin American Graduate School (ESCOLATINA) at the University of Chile after a successful application. His focus shifted from intelligence activities to education and professional development.

In 1977, Iturriaga became head of the Economic Intelligence Department of the DINA, being one of the founders. Iturriaga is accused of being responsible for Operation Colombo, during which political opponents "disappeared" in Argentina while Santiago claimed they had killed themselves as a result of political in-fighting. In his defense, Iturriaga argues that there is no evidence linking him to the operation and that the accusations against him are "unfounded" and that the "presumptions of guilt" that have been made against him do not meet the necessary legal standards to be considered valid.

After a personal complaint against the National Director of Information, he requested a new assignment and left DINA in May 1978. Before that he was temporarily assigned to the Personnel Directorate of the General Staff of the Army. After this, he was appointed as Chief of Staff of the Undersecretariat of the Ministry of Economy, leaving definitively to work in the area of national intelligence.

Later on he moved to France, where he assumed the position of Chile's military attaché in 1981. During his time in France, Iturriaga was dedicated to establishing relations with the French Armed Forces and combating political narratives about the situation in Pinochet's Chile, his professional focus was on diplomacy and military representation of Chile abroad.

Iturriaga was also appointed governor of the province of Parinacota between 1981 and 1984, and also governor of the province of Valdivia between 1986 and 1988.

At the end of 1989, he was appointed Director General of National Mobilization for the next government of Patricio Aylwin, where he was to plan and coordinate actions in the Chilean Armed Forces. With the new government, he became directly dependent on a politician in the Ministry of Defense.

He officially retired from the Army in 1991, an association of victims claims that he has maintained links with DINE, DINA's successor. However, Iturriaga rejects this claim, arguing that his retirement from the DINA was for normal institutional reasons and that there is no evidence to support the claim that he continued to be linked to the organization.

== Criminal prosecution ==
In 1989, before the transition to democracy, Iturriaga was elevated to the highest grade of general in the Chilean Armed Forces, with his base in Iquique. He officially retired in 1991 as general. The same year, he was interrogated by Minister Adolfo Bañados concerning the DINA's role in the assassination of Orlando Letelier, Salvador Allende's former minister, in Washington, D.C.

In 1995, Iturriaga was also condemned to 18 years' imprisonment by the Italian Judiciary in absentia in the case about the 1975 failed assassination attempt against Christian Democrat Bernardo Leighton in Rome, which occurred on 6 October 1975, when Leighton was shot along with his wife by Italian neo-fascists in association with Stefano delle Chiaie outside the apartment building where he lived. The conviction occurred in part because of the testimony supplied by Michael Townley questioned by Iturriaga accusing him of not being "supported by concrete evidence" and that Townley is the only one who mentions him, as well as the fact that before the attack he did not know the people with whom he is accused of illicitly associating with the DINA, emphasizing the circumstances of his collaboration with the authorities and that the testimony was obtained in a context where he had already been convicted.

Iturriaga affirms that he never held the position of head of the DINA's Foreign Department, as has been attributed to him. In his defense, he emphasizes that he was the head of the "Purén" Analysis Unit and that he had no authority over the operations with which he is charged. In addition, he was not adequately notified of the judicial proceedings against him in Italy, so he could not have had a judicial defense. He is also accused in Chile in the judicial process regarding the assassination of General Carlos Prats. and his wife in Buenos Aires, an event also related to Townley and in which Iturriaga denies responsibility, holding the US agency, CIA, exclusively responsible, and affirming that he was not involved on DINA since he was studying economy in the University of Chile at the time. Iturriaga was also requested by the then Spanish magistrate, Baltasar Garzón as he was accused to have played a prominent role in the assassination of Spanish-Chilean United Nations diplomat Carmelo Soria as well.

In 2002, he was indicted for the "disappearance" of Víctor Olea in September 1974.

The following year he was indicted by magistrate Alejandro Solís, along with his former chief Manuel Contreras and General Pedro Espinoza, for the assassination of General Carlos Prats and his wife in Buenos Aires on 30 September 1974. He is also claimed by the Spanish magistrate Baltasar Garzón. The Prats case, part of Operation Condor, opened up in Chile following an extradition request made by the Argentine magistrate María Servini de Cubría.

The former vice-head of staff of the Chilean Army, General Guillermo Garín, who was also Pinochet's spokesman, gave his support to Iturriaga following his escape on 11 June 2007. Iturriaga had been sentenced to five years for the kidnapping of Luis Dagoberto San Martín, a 21-year-old opponent of Pinochet who "disappeared" in a DINA detention centre in 1974. In a June 2007 video broadcast, Iturriaga stated: "I openly rebel before this arbitrary, biased, unconstitutional and anti-judicial conviction."

Head of DINA Manuel Contreras has been the only other general to have contested the Chilean justice during democratic rule. Contreras was on the run from justice for two months, taking refuge in the south and then in a military regiment, before being captured by security forces and detained. However, various deputies, including Isabel Allende (PS), Antonio Leal (PPD), Tucapel Jiménez (PPD), and also Iván Moreira (UDI), have condemned Iturriaga's flight from justice. Jiménez warned of the existence of a "network" of protectors, as did Jaime Naranjo (PS).

Punta Peuco Prison Map.

On 2 August 2007, Iturriaga was captured in the Pacific coastal city of Viña del Mar. Judge Alejandro Solis explained that no investigation would be opened on his disappearance, as it is not considered a crime in Chilean law to disappear when one is on parole, which Iturriaga was until June 2007. He was sent to the Penal Cordillera prison in the Valparaíso Region, located in a military property. Left-wing deputies of the Concertación, such as Carlos Montes (PS) and Denisse Pascal (PS), requested his transfer to the Punta Peuco prison, considered as more tightly guarded and where condemned military personnel would enjoy less freedom of action than in the military prison. Adriana Muñoz compared the Penal Cordillera prison to the "Bermuda Triangle", because from there people disappeared just like if they had been kidnapped by UFOs." Francisco Encina (PS) considered it strange that one of the defenders of Iturriaga, the UDI senator and former head of staff of the Chilean Navy, Jorge Arancibia, was a representative of the Valparaíso Region where Iturriaga has been detained.

On 2 June 2017, Iturriaga was among 106 former intelligence officers who Chilean Judge Hernán Cristoso sentenced to prison for a judicial case involving the kidnapping and murder of 16 leftist activists in 1974 and 1975.

On 22 August 2023, Iturriaga was sentenced by the Supreme Court of Chile to 15 years and one day in prison in the judicial case about the assassination of Carmelo Soria.

For cases involving military personnel active during the military dictatorship of Augusto Pinochet, the old criminal procedure system from 1906 is used, without the guarantees introduced with the reform carried out between 2000 and 2005. These military personnel are serving sentences in the Punta Peuco prison or in Colina 1.

He is accused of having been in charge of a secret detention center known as La Venda Sexy ("Sexy Blindfold") and La Discothèque—because of the sexual abuse inflicted on blindfolded prisoners as loud music masked their screams. General Manuel Contreras, head of the DINA, he is accused of having been in charge of several assassinations carried out as part of Operation Condor.

== Personal life ==
Raúl Iturriaga was previously married to Mireya Baeza, the daughter of Ernesto Baeza Michelsen. Iturriaga and Baeza had three children.

== Books ==
- En las alas del cóndor. Editorial Maye, 2009, 437 pages. ISBN 9789568433291
- Creación Evolución e Historia Sagrada. Self-Published, 2020, 104 pages.
- ¡SOY UN PRESO POLÍTICO MILITAR! Self-Published, 2020, 46 pages.
- Bocetos... Desde el penal de Punta Peuco Self-Published, 2024, 80 pages.

== See also ==
- Chile under Pinochet
- Chilean transition to democracy
