= Michael Townley =

American-Chilean intelligence officer (born 1942)

- Born: Michael Vernon Townley; December 5, 1942 (age 83); Waterloo, Iowa
- Occupation: Assassin
- Organization: Directorate of National Intelligence (DINA)
- Spouse: Mariana Callejas
- Convictions: Assassination of Orlando Letelier; Attempted assassination of Bernardo Leighton (in absentia)

Michael Vernon Townley (born December 5, 1942) is an American-born former agent of the Directorate of National Intelligence (DINA), the secret police of Chile during the regime of Augusto Pinochet. In 1978, Townley pleaded guilty to the 1976 murders of Orlando Letelier, former Chilean ambassador to the United States, and Ronni Karpen Moffitt, Letelier's co-worker at the Institute for Policy Studies. He was sentenced to ten years in prison, serving 62 months. As part of his plea bargain, Townley received immunity from further prosecution; he was not extradited to Argentina to stand trial for the 1974 assassination of Chilean General Carlos Prats and his wife Sofía Cuthbert in Buenos Aires.

In 1993, Townley was also convicted in absentia by an Italian court of carrying out the 1975 Rome murder attempt on Bernardo Leighton. Townley worked in producing chemical weapons for DINA which would be used against Pinochet regime political opponents, along with Colonel Gerardo Huber and the DINA biochemist Eugenio Berríos. He has long maintained status as a protected witness.

== Early life ==
Townley was born on December 5, 1942, in Waterloo, Iowa. In 1957, he moved to Chile with his father, Vernon Townley, who became head of the Ford Motor Company in Chile. He worked as a salesman of mutual fund stocks. In 1967, he moved to Miami with his family and worked as a mechanic in Miami's Little Havana, where he became friends with anti-Castro exiles.

In 1970, Townley moved his family back to Chile. Townley later testified that, before leaving the US, he contacted the CIA to offer his services in Chile, however Townley said he never worked for the CIA. Back in Chile, Townley ran a clandestine anti-Allende radio station and worked with violent opposition groups. He fled Chile in the months before the 1973 coup which overthrew Allende. Townley then returned to Chile and was recruited by the DINA.

== 1974 assassination of Carlos Prats ==
Michael Townley was responsible for the assassination of General Carlos Prats, who served as a minister in Salvador Allende's government while Commander-in-chief of the Chilean Army. Immediately after the 1973 coup, Prats went into exile in Argentina.

According to some sources, DINA chief Manuel Contreras gave Townley the task of assassinating Prats, Contreras later claimed that Townley was a CIA agent instead. Townley spent three weeks in Buenos Aires monitoring Prats and planning. On September 30, 1974, Prats and his wife Sofia were killed outside their apartment in Buenos Aires by a radio-controlled car bomb. Debris reached the ninth-floor balcony of the building across the street. In 1983, Townley entered a plea deal which would grant him immunity from prosecution.

== 1975 Bernardo Leighton assassination attempt ==
In March 1993, Townley was convicted and sentenced in absentia in Italy to an 18-year prison sentence, with two years remission, over his role as an intermediary between the DINA and Italian neo-fascist terrorist organizations, including Avanguardia Nazionale. However, he was still a member of the United States witness protection; at the time of Enrique Arancibia Clavel's arrest in May 2000 for murder of Carlos Prats, it was acknowledged that Townley was left as a member of witness protection following the Orlando Letelier case.

Michael Townley also stated that Arancibia had traveled to California in the autumn of 1977 on banking business for ALFA, alias Stefano Delle Chiaie. Enrique Arancibia is a former DINA agent who resided in unofficial exile in Buenos Aires after the assassination of Chilean Army Chief of Staff René Schneider on October 25, 1970. Arancibia was arrested by Argentine intelligence officers shortly after the extradition of Townley to the US and charged with espionage.

Townley accused Raúl Iturriaga Neumann of being responsible for the attempted assassination of Christian Democrat Bernardo Leighton in Rome on 6 October 1975, during which Leighton and his wife were shot by Italian neo-fascists associated with Stefano Delle Chiaie outside the apartment building where they lived. However, Iturriaga has challenged Townley's account, which led to his conviction by the Italian courts, arguing that it is not "supported by concrete evidence" and that Townley is the only person to have implicated him. He also stated that prior to the attack he had never met the individuals with whom he is accused of having collaborated unlawfully on behalf of the DINA. Furthermore, he emphasized the circumstances under which Townley cooperated with authorities, noting that the testimony was obtained after Townley had already been convicted.

== 1976 assassination of Orlando Letelier ==
Townley was convicted in the United States of the 1976 murder of Orlando Letelier in Washington, D.C. During his trial, he said that Pinochet was responsible for planning the murder. Manuel Contreras, head of the DINA, also stated that Pinochet planned the assassination of both Prats and Letelier. Townley served 62 months in prison for the murder.

Townley confessed that he had hired five anti-Castro Cuban exiles to booby-trap Letelier's car. According to Jean-Guy Allard, after consultations with the leadership of the anti-Castro Cuban organization Coordinación de Organizaciones Revolutionarias Unidas (CORU), including Luis Posada Carriles and Orlando Bosch, those chosen to carry out the murder were Cuban-Americans José Dionisio Suárez, Virgilio Paz Romero, Alvin Ross Díaz, and brothers Guillermo and Ignacio Novo Sampol. According to the Miami Herald, Luis Posada Carriles was also at this meeting, which decided on Letelier's death and also about the Cubana Flight 455 bombing. Townley was the prosecution's chief witness at the trial for Ross and the Novo brothers.

Michael Townley in 1978.

In March 1978, Michael Townley sent a letter to Manuel Contreras in which he said

I accept that there are things to do and it's better not to inform higher ups. But in my judgement, the physical elimination abroad, with all its risks and possible consequences, especially in the U.S., where there is perhaps the best police force in the world, is not one of them. [...] In my judgement the greatest error has been not informing his Excellency, the truth and real magnitude of this problem. Without this, his Excellency was unable to act or give someone the necessary authority to act [...] So, I support: 1- That if his Excellency is presented with the truth, it is possible and probable that you will be removed from every position, where the Government can be protected. 2- The way that this problem has gone and is going, the Government will fall beyond help as a result of the F.B.I. discovering the truth, by the anger of the Cubans, by the U.S. breaking relations, by the opposition group here discovering the truth, etc., etc. (There are not enough fingers to cover the hole, that the dike has). So, I ask you: 1- To tell his Excellency the truth of this situation, so that he can use his authority as he can.

— "Dear don Manuel" letter, Michael Townley, 1978.

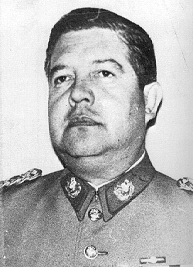
Manuel Contreras, DINA chief.

In April 1978, Chile agreed to extradite Townley to the United States, in order to reduce the tension resulting from Orlando Letelier's murder. Generals Manuel Contreras and Odlanier Mena met with the Junta to resolve the matter of Townley’s extradition to the U.S., and it was stated in the meeting that neither the Junta nor Pinochet himself knew of Townley’s existence. General Contreras lied and assured them he had no connection to Townley, something he also denied three times in 1976 and claimed that Townley had never worked for the Chilean intelligence and that, in the worst-case scenario, he might have acted as an informant. Based on those assurances, he was handed over to the U.S. Since Townley also participated in the assassination attempts on Prats and Leighton, and Pinochet was accused by the U.S. justice system of the attack on Orlando Letelier. The U.S. intelligence believed the attack on Letelier was ordered by Pinochet, without knowing the details of the Dina-Junta meetings.

However, his departure from Chile did not undergo a standard extradition process and was regarded as an expulsion. In addition, Townley also sought protection from Manuel Contreras and Pedro Espinoza. He arrived in the United States on April 8, 1978. He made an agreement with the U.S. government on April 17, 1978, which required that he only provide information relevant to violations of U.S. law or offenses committed in U.S. jurisdiction. Based on that argument, he refused to provide any information concerning DINA during the trial of the three Cuban defendants in Washington, D.C. in early 1979 concerning Letelier's assassination. Townley was then freed under an unofficial Witness Protection Program. The United States is still waiting for Pedro Espinoza Bravo, a former Chilean military and DINA operative also involved in the assassination of Letelier, to be extradited. DINA chief Manuel Contreras died in Santiago in 2015, without having been extradited.

In an interview with authorities on October 20, 1981, Townley declared that Castro opponent Virgilio Paz Romero brought with him a Colt .45 caliber automatic pistol when he visited Chile in the spring of 1976. According to Townley, Romero said that the weapon had recently been used in a "hit" by the Cuban Nationalist Movement and that his purpose in Chile was to use it again. Townley then said that Romero had broken the weapon in pieces and scattered the pieces throughout Santiago.

In 2005, DINA chief Manuel Contreras also told the Chilean judge responsible for trying the case that Townley had been supported for Letelier's assassination by CIA agents, as well as the Cuban Nationalist Movement and members of the Venezuela's National Directorate of Intelligence and Prevention Services (DISIP), for which Luis Posada Carriles worked. General Vernon Walters, CIA deputy director from 1972 to 1976, informed Pinochet that Letelier represented a threat to the U.S. and was preparing a Chilean government in exile, according to Contreras. Contreras wrote in the document that "the Chilean President disposed in personal, exclusive and direct manner of the action of CIA agent Michael Townley against Mr. Orlando Letelier".

Contreras also stated that Chile's National Information Center (CNI) handed out monthly payments between 1978 and 1990 to the persons who had worked with Townley in Chile, all members of Patria y Libertad: Mariana Callejas (Townley's wife), Francisco Oyarzún, Gustavo Etchepare and Eugenio Berríos. Assassinated in 1992, Berríos worked with drug traffickers and DEA agents.

According to the family of Manuel Contreras:

In the United States, Michael Townley, facing two life sentences, said and declared everything he was told to say, precisely with the objective of implicating my father (Manuel Contreras) and General Pinochet.

In December 2016, a Chilean court ruled that both Townley and former Chilean Major General Armando Fernandez Larios could be tried in Chile for these murders.

Raúl Iturriaga Neumann and Manuel Contreras alleged that Michael Townley was a CIA agent and holds him, together with the intelligence agency alone, responsible for the assassination of General Carlos Prats and his wife in Buenos Aires, as well as that of Orlando Letelier and his secretary in the United States. a thesis that Townley anticipated and explicitly denied in his private confessions.

Investigations into the CIA's alleged role in the assassination in both the US and Chile have found no proof of CIA involvement. Letelier's son Juan Pablo told the BBC that "There is no evidence that the CIA was involved".

Once Townley was convicted by the United States justice system, he received a light sentence in a protected facility and was later given a house in Boca Raton, Florida, where many CIA agents retire.

== Investigations ==
In 2003, Argentine Federal Judge María Servini de Cubría asked Chile for the extradition of Townley's wife, Mariana Callejas, who was accused of involvement in Carlos Prats' murder. But, in July 2005, Chilean judge Nibaldo Segura of the Court of Appeals stated that the case cannot proceed, arguing that Callejas was already being tried in Chile.

Questioned in March 2005 by Judge Alejandro Madrid about former Chilean Christian Democrat President Eduardo Frei Montalva's death, Michael Townley acknowledged links between Colonia Dignidad, led by Paul Schäfer and DINA on one side and the Laboratorio de Guerra Bacteriológica del Ejército (Bacteriological Warfare Laboratory of the Army) on the other. It is suspected the toxin that supposedly killed Frei Montalva in a Santa Maria clinic in 1982 was created there. This new laboratory in Colonia Dignidad would have been, according to him, the continuation of the laboratory the DINA had in Via Naranja de lo Curro where he worked with DINA biochemist Eugenio Berríos; despite this claim, Townley previous acknowledged that the laboratory where he based his production of toxins was located in the basement of his home. Townley would also have testified on biological experiments made upon prisoners in Colonia Dignidad with the help of the two above mentioned laboratories. However, the allegation that Montalva was a murder victim was later dismissed in Chilean court.

In 1992, Townley testified that the Spanish diplomat Carmelo Soria, assassinated in 1976, had been detained at his home on Via Naranja in the sector of Lo Curro. There he was tortured and, since he did not speak, subjected to sarin (which had been made by Berríos). Soria was then detained and tortured again in the Villa Grimaldi and his case was included in Spanish magistrate Baltasar Garzon's indictment of Pinochet.

In May 2016, Chile's Supreme Court asked the United States to extradite Chilean Armando Fernandez Larios, Townley and Cuban Virgilio Paz, all three of whom were linked to the September 21, 1976, car-bombing murders in Washington, D.C. In November 2002, Soria's widow, Laura Gonzalez-Vera, along with the personal representative of Soria's estate, sued Townley seeking damages for Soria's torture and killing. When Townley defaulted, the district court entered a $7 million judgment against him.

The Supreme Court unanimously ruled that the foreign ministry of Chile should file an extradition request to the United States for Michael Townley and Armando Fernández Larios.

In May 2016, the Supreme Court of Chile asked for the extradition of Townley, Virgilio, and Armando Fernández Larios for their alleged roles in the murder of Soria in 1976. As of 2015, Townley remained in the U.S. Witness Protection Program and his whereabouts were unknown. In August 2023, however, it was reported that a recent conviction which was given to six former DINA agents and two former army officers would be the "final conviction" issued by the Supreme Court of Chile for Soria's murder.

=== 2023 confessions publication ===
On November 22, 2023, Townley's confessions about his four-year career as a DINA assassin were "reproduced in full and published together" for the first time by the National Security Archive. Despite this, the National Security Archive's website also acknowledged that "Over the years, references to Townley's confession have appeared in books and articles as researchers and reporters gained access to Chile's judicial files." In his first "confession" letter dated March 13, 1978, Townley described himself as taking part in numerous missions on behalf of DINA and "following orders from Gen. Contreras." In another "confession," dated March 14, 1978, Townley detailed how he was recruited by DINA officials in 1974 and how he served DINA's lead international assassin. He would be given a mansion in the upper-class Lo Curro neighborhood of Santiago, be instructed to build a chemical warfare laboratory in his basement, and get appointed to lead a special DINA unit called the “Agrupación Avispa”—the Wasp Group—which operated under DINA's Mulchén Brigade and was “dedicated to elimination” of opponents of the Pinochet regime. He also confessed to the murders of two Chileans, - real estate conservator Renato León Zenteno (1976) and Army corporal and DINA agent Manuel Leyton (1977)- using sarin nerve gas that he manufactured in the chemical laboratory in his home. In a U.S. Department of Justice affidavit dated August 23, 1991, U.S. Justice Department attorney Eric B. Marcy noted how the United States obtained the documents from his wife between 1982 and 1990, stating, among other things, that the confessions “were prepared by Townley prior to his expulsion from Chile in order to protect him from the fugitives Manuel Contreras and Pedro Espinoza and to protect his expulsion from Chile." The aliases which Townley used while he was a DINA agent included Juan Andres Wilson; Hans Peterson Silva; Kenneth William Enyart; and Pablo Andres Simpon Valle.

In a letter from March 14, 1976, Townley noted how he received the order to assassinate Orlando Letelier from Pedro Espinoza. When updating the letter after the assassination of Letelier was carried out on September 21, 1976, Townley noted how he recruited the team of American-based Cuban exiles after traveling to the United States after obtained phony visas in Paraguay. Townley also claimed he received assistance from a network of individual Southern Cone secret polices known as Red Condor.

=== Alleged role in Pablo Neruda's death ===
In 2011, an investigation was launched into the death of Pablo Neruda, partially on the strength of a statement from his driver that he was injected with a poison by a man calling himself "Dr. Price" whose description closely matched that of Townley. Police examined this link while Neruda's body was exhumed and tested for possible toxins.

On November 8, 2013, the test results were released, with head of Chile's medical legal service Patricio Bustos stating that "No relevant chemical substances have been found that could be linked to Mr. Neruda's death". However, Carroza said that he is waiting for the results of the last scientific test conducted in May 2015, which found that Neruda was infected with the Staphylococcus aureus bacterium, which can be highly toxic and result in death if modified.

The Chilean government suggested in 2015 that it was "highly probable that a third party" was responsible for Neruda's death, and a forensics test taken through samples of Neruda's remains in 2017 rejected Neruda's "official cause of death," which had been listed as prostate cancer.

However, scientists who exhumed Neruda's body in 2013 had backed claims that he was suffering from prostate cancer. It was also acknowledged that Neruda's driver was the one who claimed he was poisoned.

== In literature ==
In Roberto Bolaño's novel By Night in Chile (2000), the character Jimmy Thompson, an American who has been deputized by the Chilean secret police to torture opponents of the regime, is based on Michael Townley.
