= Stefano Delle Chiaie =

Italian far-right activist (1936–2019)

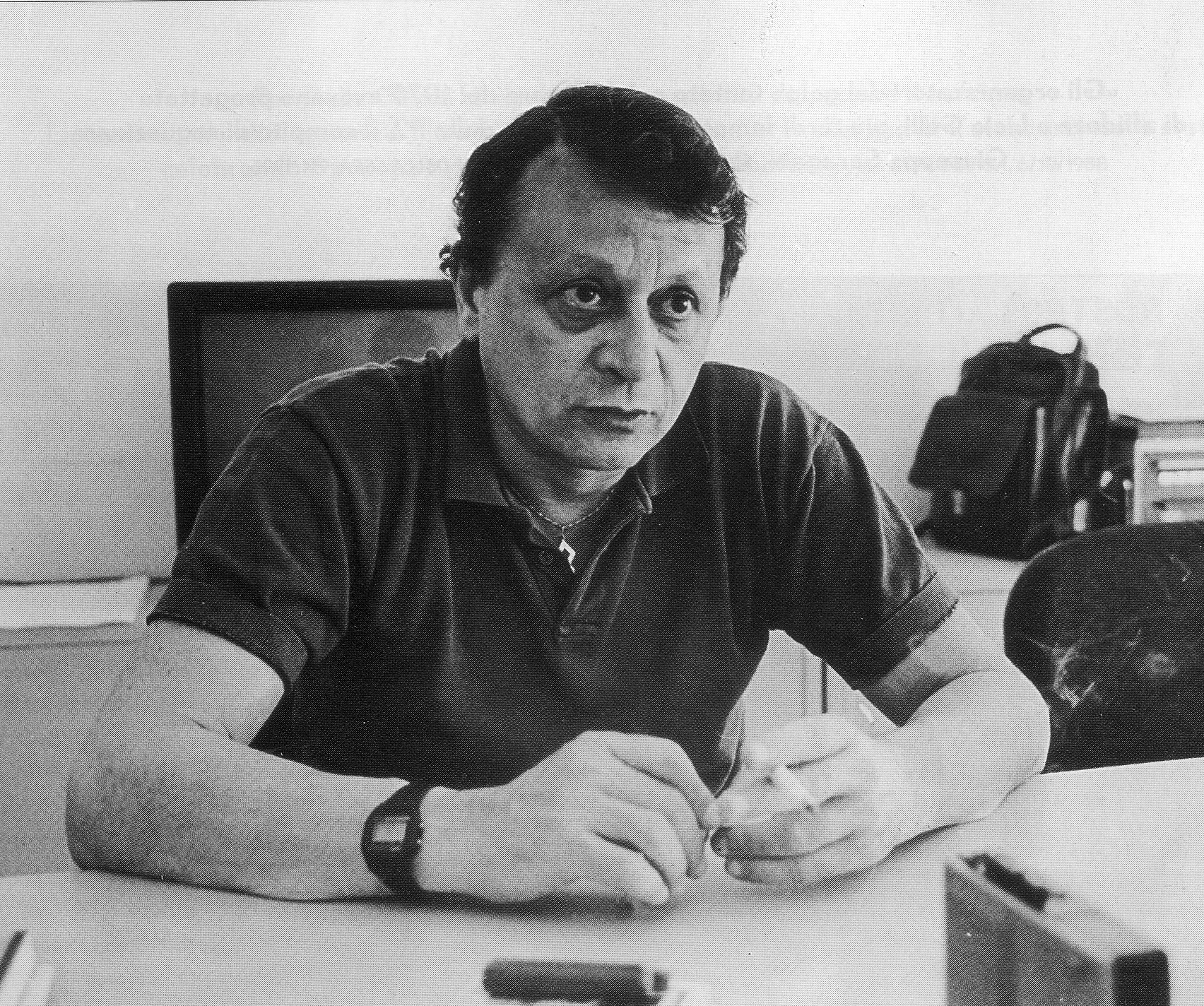
- Stefano Delle Chiaie in 1975
- Born: 13 September 1936; Caserta, Italy
- Died: 10 September 2019 (aged 82); Rome, Italy
- Organizations: Avanguardia Nazionale (National Vanguard); Ordine Nuovo (New Order); Paladin Group
- Known for: Strategy of tension
- Political party: Movimento Sociale Italiano (Italian Social Movement)

Stefano Delle Chiaie (13 September 1936 – 10 September 2019) was an Italian neo-fascist terrorist. He was the founder of Avanguardia Nazionale, a member of Ordine Nuovo, and founder of Lega nazionalpopolare. He went on to become a wanted man worldwide, suspected of involvement in Italy's strategy of tension, but was acquitted. He was a friend of Licio Gelli, grandmaster of P2 masonic lodge. He was suspected of involvement in South America's Operation Condor, but was acquitted. He was known by his nickname "il caccola" (Roman slang for "shorty") as he was just over five feet tall - although he stated that originally, the nickname came from his very young involvement, at age 14, in the Italian Social Movement (MSI), a neo-fascist political party established after the war.

== Activity in Italy ==
=== Founder of Avanguardia Nazionale in 1960 ===
Delle Chiaie began as a member of the Italian Social Movement (MSI), a neo-fascist party. However, he rejected the participation of the MSI in elections, preferring to take the battle to the streets. He left the MSI in 1958. After participating in the foundation of the Centri Studi Ordine Nuovo with members of the MSI, he created the small Gruppi di Azione Rivoluzionari (GAR) at the end of the 1950s. Involved in various political actions, such as protesting against Eisenhower's visit to Italy or fighting against Italian Communist Party members, he already maintained close international links, notably with the Austrian Konrad Windisch, leader of the neo-Nazi Kameradschaftsring Nationaler Jugendverbände (KNJ). He then formed, in 1960, the National Vanguard ("Avanguardia Nazionale") as a street-fighting group. Around this time, he also became a member of the secret P2 Masonic Lodge, which later led him to be accused of being ordered by Gelli to conduct bombings.

From 1962 to 1964 he was employed by the Servizio informazioni forze armate tasked with infiltrating in and breaking up left-wing demonstrations.

In May 1974, Delle Chiaie’s last known forwarding address was discovered by investigators from the Portuguese Armed Forces Movement when they raided the Lisbon HQ of Aginter Press and its political wing, "Order and Tradition." The address was: Apartado 1682, El Salvador.

Delle Chiaie soon became a close ally of Junio Valerio Borghese and was suspected with him in the Golpe Borghese, but was acquitted because at the time he was in Barcelona.

Delle Chiaie was arrested in Caracas, Venezuela on 27 March 1987 and extradited to Italy to stand trial for his role in the Strage di Piazza Fontana bombing of Milan on 12 December 1969, when 17 people were killed and 88 wounded. Delle Chiaie was acquitted by the Assize Court in Catanzaro in 1989, along with fellow accused Massimiliano Fachini. On 20 February 1989 he was declared not guilty. On 5 July 1991 on appeal was acquitted of the case and for participation in subversive association.

He was also charged with subversive association in relationship to the 1980 Bologna railway station bombing but was acquitted on appeals.

=== Founder of Lega Nazionalpopolare (1991) ===
In October 1991 he founded Lega Nazionalpopolare. The movement had limited success at the national parliamentary election in 1992 in Italy.

== Activity in France ==
Delle Chiaie started a neo-fascist transnational magazine entitled Confidentiel in Paris, France, in 1979. The magazine was also published in Italy, Spain and France and folded in 1981.

== Activity in South America ==
Delle Chiaie was described by the CIA as being the most wanted rightist terrorist in 1983, was suspected of a lot of irregular activity, but was always acquitted on appeal.

In the course of his activities, Delle Chiaie was also known by a number of aliases, including Er Caccola, Alfa, Topigigio and Alfredo Di Stéfano, after the celebrated footballer of the same name. Delle Chiaie has since spent most of his time working in Latin America. Delle Chiaie took part in Yves Guérin-Sérac's "Aginter Press" founded in António de Oliveira Salazar's Portugal in 1965.

As cited in The Fourth Reich: Klaus Barbie and the Neo-Fascist Connection, by Magnus Linklater, Isabel Hilton, and Neal Ascherson, Delle Chiaie was one of the orchestrators of the "Cocaine Coup" in Bolivia, along with the German war criminal Klaus Barbie, that brought General Luis García Meza to power in the early 1980s.

His international activities started early. He first took part in Yves Guérin-Sérac's "Aginter Press", founded in Salazar's Portugal in 1965. After assisting Borghese during his 1970 attempted coup in Italy, he escaped to Francoist Spain — as would Vincenzo Vinciguerra — and met with future members of the GAL paramilitary group. He was then present at the Ezeiza massacre in Argentina on 20 June 1973, and then met with US-born DINA agent Michael Townley in 1975 to prepare Chilean Christian Democrat Bernardo Leighton's failed assassination. In 1976, he participated in the Montejurra Incidents against left-wing Carlists in Spain, before leaving for Latin America.

In South America, he took part in the 'Cocaine Coup' of Luis García Meza Tejada, when a notoriously corrupt military regime forced its way to power in Bolivia in 1980, with assistance from the Argentine SIDE which had been called on for 70 foreign agents. He later worked for the new government in training its soldiers. Delle Chiaie later declared in a 1983 interview to a Spanish reporter:

I was decided to give my hand to the creation of an international revolutionary movement... Therefore, when the opportunity of a national revolution appeared in Bolivia, we were there to shoulder our comrades. We were neither repressors nor narco-terrorists, but political militants.

Judge Baltazar Garzón's investigations demonstrated that he had worked both for Pinochet's political police, the DINA, for the Argentine Anticommunist Alliance (Triple A) and for Hugo Banzer's dictatorship in Bolivia.

Delle Chiaie had met in Madrid with Pinochet during Franco's funeral in 1975, beginning his involvement with the Chilean regime and his part in Operation Condor. According to lawyer Alun Jones, representative of the Spanish justice during Spain's request to Great Britain for the extradition of Augusto Pinochet, Pinochet met with Delle Chiaie in Madrid to plan an attack against Carlos Altamirano, the leader of the Chilean Socialist Party. The plan failed, either because of Altamirano's awareness and personal caution, or because some intelligence agency — it is not known from which country — may have made him aware of the threats on his personal life.

According to Le Monde diplomatique, Delle Chiaie met with Abdullah Çatlı in Latin America and during a visit of the Turkish "Grey Wolves" member in Miami in September 1982. Abdullah Çatlı "is reckoned to have been one of the main perpetrators of underground operations carried out by the Turkish branch of the Gladio organisation and had played a key role in the bloody events of the period 1976-80 which paved the way for the military coup d'état of September 1980.

During a 1997 hearing before the Commission on Terrorism headed by senator Giovanni Pellegrino, Stefano Delle Chiaie went on speaking about a "black fascist International" and his hopes of creating the conditions of an "international revolution." He talked about the World Anticommunist League, but said that after attending a meeting in Paraguay, he left it. He claimed that the latter was a front for the CIA. He only admitted having taken part in the New European Order (NOE) organization, and denied having worked with the International Anticommunist Alliance around 1974.

According to CIA documents, in Madrid, Delle Chiaie also met with Michael Townley, a DINA agent, and Virgilio Paz Romero, a Cuban based in Miami, with connections in Chile, to prepare, with the help of Franco's secret police, the murder of Bernardo Leighton, a Chilean Christian Democrat. On 6 October 1975 Leighton and his wife were severely injured by gunshots while in exile in Rome. While Townley insisted that DINA head Manuel Contreras gave him the order to carry out the assassination attempt, Vinciguerra alleged that Dell Chiaie gave him information that Chilean leader Augusto Pinochet directly ordered it. Delle Chiaie would be acquitted, while Townley would be convicted and sentenced to 18 years in absentia in March 1993.

Delle Chiaie, along with fellow neo-fascist Vincenzo Vinciguerra, also testified in Rome in December 1995 before judge María Servini de Cubría that Enrique Arancibia Clavel (a former Chilean secret police agent prosecuted for crimes against humanity in 2004) and Michael Townley were directly involved in the Carlos Prats assassination.

Michael Townley has claimed that DINA agent Enrique Arancibia Clavel, convicted in Argentina for the 1974 assassination of General Carlos Prats, had travelled to California in the autumn of 1977 on banking business for ALFA, alias Stefano Delle Chiaie.

== See also ==
- Operation Gladio
- Years of Lead (Italy)
- Yves Guérin-Sérac
- Armed, far-right organizations in Italy
