= Eugenio Berríos =

Chilean biochemist

- Born: Eugenio Berríos Sagred; 14 November 1947; Santiago, Chile
- Disappeared: 15 November 1992; Seccional Policial N° 24, Parque del Plata, Uruguay
- Died: c. November 1992 (aged 45)
- Cause of death: Homicide
- Body discovered: April 1995; El Pinar, Uruguay
- Other name: Hermes
- Education: University of Chile
- Occupation: Biochemist
- Organization: Dirección de Inteligencia Nacional
- Political party: Fatherland and Liberty

Eugenio Berríos Sagredo (14 November 1947 –c. November 1992) was a Chilean biochemist and member of the Dirección de Inteligencia Nacional (DINA), who produced sarin as part of Proyecto Andrea. Berríos also produced the biochemical weapons anthrax and botulism for the DINA.

Aided by La Cofradía (the successor of Operation Condor), Berríos fled to Uruguay in October 1991 to avoid testifying about the assassination of Orlando Letelier. On 15 November 1992, Berríos was disappeared and subsequently murdered by Chilean and Uruguayan intelligence agencies. Berríos' remains were found at a beach in El Pinar in April 1995.

== DINA agent ==
Known in the DINA under his alias "Hermes", for which he began to work in 1974, Berríos was connected to the creation of the explosive used for Orlando Letelier's car-bombing assassination in Washington, D.C. in 1976. In April 1976, Berríos synthesized sarin. He was also suspected, along with DINA agent Michael Townley, of the torture and assassination of the Spanish citizen Carmelo Soria.

In the late 1970s at the height of the Beagle Crisis between Chile and Argentina, Berríos is reported to have worked on a plan to poison the water supply of Buenos Aires.

In 1978, Townley, in a sworn but confidential declaration, stated that sarin gas was produced by the DINA under Berríos' direction. He added that it was used to assassinate the real state archives custodian Renato León Zenteno and the Chilean Army Corporal Manuel Leyton.

Berríos also allegedly produced cocaine for Pinochet, who then sold it to Europe and the United States.

Former head of DINA Manuel Contreras declared to Chilean justice officials in 2005 that the CNI, successor of DINA, handed out monthly payments between 1978 and 1990 to the persons who had worked with Townley in Chile, all members of the far-right group Patria y Libertad: Mariana Callejas (Townley's wife), Francisco Oyarzún, Gustavo Etchepare and Berríos. According to La Nación, Berríos also worked with drug traffickers and Drug Enforcement Administration agents.

== Frei Montalva ==
Questioned in March 2005 by Judge Alejandro Madrid about ex-Chilean Christian Democrat President Eduardo Frei Montalva's death, DINA agent Michael Townley acknowledged links between Colonia Dignidad, led by alleged ex-Nazi Paul Schäfer, and DINA on one hand, and the Laboratorio de Guerra Bacteriológica del Ejército (Army Biological Warfare Laboratory) on the other hand. It is suspected that the toxin that supposedly killed Frei Montalva in Santiago's Santa Maria clinic in 1982 was created there. This new laboratory in Colonia Dignidad would have been, according to him, the continuation of the laboratory that the DINA had in Via Naranja de lo Curro, where he worked with Eugenio Berríos in the clandestine unit Quetropillán. Townley would also have testified on biological experiments made upon the prisoners in Colonia Dignidad with the help of the two above-mentioned laboratories. However, Townley, who answered personally to DINA head Manuel Contreras, left Chile in April 1978 after he agreed to surrender to U.S. authorities for his role in the Orlando Letelier-Ronnie Monfitt assassination that occurred on U.S. soil. though he would be released from prison in 1981, Townley remained in U.S. custody as a member of the U.S. Witness Protection Program. Townley also previously acknowledged in a secret "confession" letter in 1978 that the laboratory where he personally produced the toxins which he used when he carried out some assassinations on behalf of DINA was in fact in the basement at his mansion in the upper-class Lo Curro neighborhood of Santiago. In 2019, six people were convicted for allegedly murdering Frei Montalva. However, the convictions were overturned in 2021, as it was determined that Frei Montalva's death was not a homicide.

== Escape, death and trial ==
On October 26, 1991, a year before the "terror archives" were found in Paraguay, Eugenio Berríos was escorted from Chile to Uruguay by the Special Unity of the DINE (Direccion de Inteligencia del Ejército, Army's Intelligence agency), in order to avoid him testifying before the Chilean court regarding the Letelier case and the case concerning the 1976 assassination of the Spanish diplomat and CEPAL civil servant Carmelo Soria. He had just been indicted by the magistrate Adolfo Bañados in charge of the Letelier case.

"Operación Silencio" started in April 1991, in order to hinder the investigations of the Chilean legal system regarding crimes committed during Pinochet's dictatorship, and the spiriting away of Arturo Sanhueza Ross, linked to the murder of MIR leader Jecar Neghme in 1989. According to the Rettig Report, Jecar Neghme's death was carried out by Chilean intelligence agents. In September of that same year Carlos Herrera Jiménez, who killed trade-unionist Tucapel Jiménez, left the country. Berríos followed in October 1991, using passports from four different countries: Argentina, Uruguay, Paraguay and Brazil, raising concerns about Operation Condor still being in place. In Uruguay, he was protected by members of the Chilean and Uruguayan military intelligence as part of La cofradia, alleged to be the direct heir of Operation Condor.

In Uruguay, Berríos was hidden at one of Uruguayan Colonel Eduardo Radaelli's family estates at Parque del Plata, using the alias "Tulio Orellana". Berríos, however, escaped imprisonment on November 15, 1992, asking for sanctuary next door at a retired navy officer's residence who, along with his wife, decided to escort him to the closest police station, Seccional 24 Parque del Plata. There, Berríos claimed that he had been kidnapped by Chilean and Uruguayan military officials, that Gen. Pinochet intended to kill him and asking to be taken into custody since he had entered the country using fake documentation. Radaelli arrived shortly after, demanding the police officers to hand over Berríos since he was "[...] out of his mind, delirious, and in need of treatment". Police officer Elbio Hernández was uncertain but later, Uruguayan military officer Tomás Casella arrived at the station also demanding the policemen to hand over Berríos. After receiving a phone call from his superior, Hernández surrendered Berríos to the Uruguayan officers, and he was never seen again alive.

In February 1993, Pinochet travelled to Uruguay, and officer Casella was appointed as his aide-de-camp. In June, 1993, an anonymous letter sent to various Uruguayan deputies denounced Berríos' presence in the country, leading them to request of President Luis Alberto Lacalle's government immediate investigations. On June 6, 1993, Lacalle immediately dismissed the police chief of Canelones, Ramón Rivas, on charges of not having informed him of what had occurred. Three days later official investigations were initiated concerning the Berríos case. On June 9, 1993, 14 Army Generals met with the Minister of Defence Mariano Brito, and two days later, General Mario Aguerrondo was dismissed. That same June, after the details of the facts surrounding Berríos' murder leaked, Casella, Radaelli and Wellington Sarli (another Uruguayan military officer) travelled to Chile to allegedly attend an Intelligence course which, according to Casella, was later cancelled since intelligence officers from several other countries were unable to attend. They spent a day in Santiago, and were later flown to Osorno so they could spend some days at the Termas de Puyehue, with all expends covered. In a 2007 interview, Casella stated that he had first entered into contact with Berríos in March 1992 under the requests of a Chilean intelligence officer, and that he had immediately informed General Mario Aguerrondo, then head of the SID Uruguayan military intelligence agency (now retired), who allegedly ordered him to remain in contact with the Chileans.

Finally, a corpse, identified by the Uruguayan justice as that of Berríos, was found in April 1995 in a beach of El Pinar, near Montevideo, with two gunshots to the head. His hands and feet were tied together, and forensic examinations declared that after his execution he was put inside a burlap sack, which was in turn tied closed with a rope. Forensic dentistry immediately led to his identification as Berríos. Furthermore, DNA fingerprinting was also done several years later.

According to the daughter of Carmelo Soria, the Spanish diplomat assassinated in 1976, Chilean Eduardo Aldunate Hermann, second-in-command of the MINUSTAH United Nations force in Haiti, was also involved in the assassination of Eugenio Berríos.

Three Uruguayan military officers (Tomas Casella, Washington Sarli and Eduardo Radaelli) have been extradited in April 2006 to Chile and were detained there, before being released on bail in September 2006. In October 2006, the Court of Appeal of Santiago stripped Pinochet's parliamentary immunity (who was, in 1992, head of the Chilean military), opening up the way for his judgment concerning the homicide of Berríos. Furthermore, the former directors of the DINE, Hernán Ramírez Rurange and Eugenio Covarrubias, have been charged of obstruction to justice in this case. Ramírez Rurange, several other Chilean militaries and one civilian, and the three Uruguayan officers have also been charged of kidnapping, while Eugenio Covarrubias was charged with kidnapping and homicide. Emilio Rojas Gómez, the former Chilean cultural attaché in Montevideo, was also charged with obstruction of justice.

On August 11, 2015, all 14 defendants were found guilty by the Supreme Court and sentenced to between five and twenty years in prison. Hernán Ramírez Rurange, sentenced to twenty years, shot and killed himself two days later.

== Allegations concerning Berríos' disappearance ==
In July 2006, after having denounced Augusto Pinochet's involvement in the cocaine trade, former DINA director Manuel Contreras asserted in a judicial document handed to Judge Claudio Pavez, presiding over the investigation concerning the 1992 assassination of Colonel Gerardo Huber, that Berríos was in fact alive and now worked for the DEA. Contreras' lawyer, Fidel Reyes, alleged that the corpse discovered in El Pinar belonged in reality to a foreigner, and that Berríos allegedly had in 2004 attended the funeral, in Chile, of one of his close relative. According to Contreras' deposition, the cocaine (which was "black cocaine" especially made to be undetectable) was produced by Berríos in a military installation in Talagante, and both Pinochet's son, Marco Antonio Pinochet, and the businessman Edgardo Bathich were involved in the drug trade. The money from the trade was allegedly directly put in Pinochet's bank accounts abroad.

Manuel Contreras' allegations concerning Berríos' alleged survival have been flatly denied by the Uruguayan judge in charge of investigating his assassination, who claims that she is "99% sure" of the identification of the corpse found in 1995, and added that DNA analysis had been made a few years later.

== Film ==
The Uruguayan film director Esteban Schroeder produced a movie, Matar a todos, loosely based on Berríos' murder. The movie was adapted from the book 99 por ciento asesinado written by the Uruguayan writer Pablo Vierci, and was presented in the San Sebastián International Film Festival.

== See also ==
- Augusto Pinochet's arrest and trial
- Chilean transition to democracy
- Chile under Pinochet
- Enrique Arancibia Clavel
- List of solved missing person cases: 1950–1999
