= Carlos Prats =

Chilean Army officer and politician, assassinated

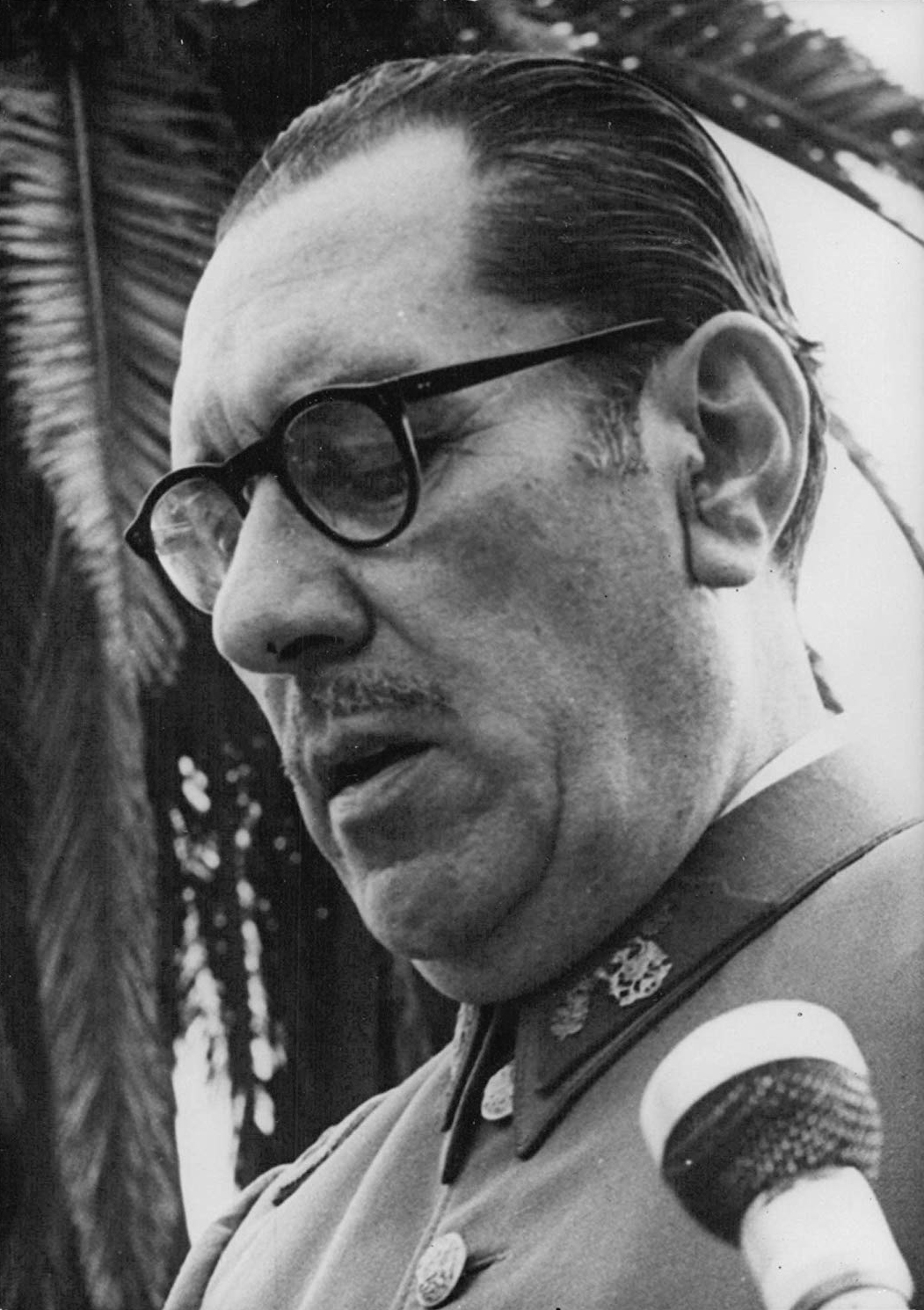

Commander-in-chief of the Chilean Army
- In office October 27, 1970 – August 23, 1973
- President: Salvador Allende
- Preceded by: René Schneider
- Succeeded by: Augusto Pinochet

Chilean Minister of the Interior
- In office November 2, 1972 – March 27, 1973
- President: Salvador Allende
- Preceded by: Jaime Suárez Bastidas
- Succeeded by: Gerardo Espinoza Carrillo

Chilean Minister of National Defense
- In office August 9, 1973 – August 23, 1973
- President: Salvador Allende
- Preceded by: Clodomiro Almeyda
- Succeeded by: Orlando Letelier

Personal details
- Born: February 24, 1915 Talcahuano, Chile
- Died: September 30, 1974 (aged 59) Buenos Aires, Argentina
- Cause of death: Assassination (car bomb)
- Party: Independent
- Spouse: Sofía Cuthbert (m. 1944–1974): died with her husband
- Children: 3
- Profession: Military officer
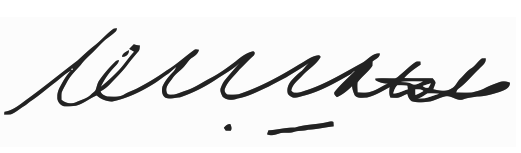
- Signature

Carlos Prats González (Spanish: [ˈkaɾlos ˈpɾats]; February 24, 1915 – September 30, 1974) was a Chilean Army officer and politician. He served as a minister in Salvador Allende's government while Commander-in-chief of the Chilean Army. He resigned in August 1973 amid growing national discontent. Immediately after General Augusto Pinochet's September 11, 1973 coup, Prats went into voluntary exile in Argentina. The following year, he and his wife, Sofía Cuthbert, were assassinated in Buenos Aires by a car bomb planted by the Dirección de Inteligencia Nacional (DINA).

== Background ==
Carlos Prats González was born in Talcahuano, a port city in southern Central Chile, in 1915, the oldest son of Carlos Prats Risopatrón and Hilda González Suárez. He joined the Army in 1931 and graduated at the top of his class.

In 1935, he was commissioned as an artillery officer. Three years later he became a Sub-lieutenant. Soon he returned to the Military Academy, this time as a teacher. He taught there and at the War Academy until 1954. In 1944, he married Sofia Cuthbert Chiarleoni, with whom he had three daughters.

In 1954, Prats González was promoted to Major and sent to the military mission to the United States as adjunct military attaché, where he served until 1958. That year he was promoted to Lieutenant Colonel and returned to the War Academy as a teacher. In 1961, he became commander of the Artillery Regiment Nº3 “Chorrillos”, and in 1963, became commander of the Regiment Nº1 “Tacna”.

In 1964, Prats González was promoted to Colonel and sent as military attaché to Argentina. He returned to Chile in 1967 as commander of the III Army Division. In 1968, he was promoted to Brigade General and Chief of the General Staff. The following year he was promoted to Division General.

== Public role during the Allende years ==
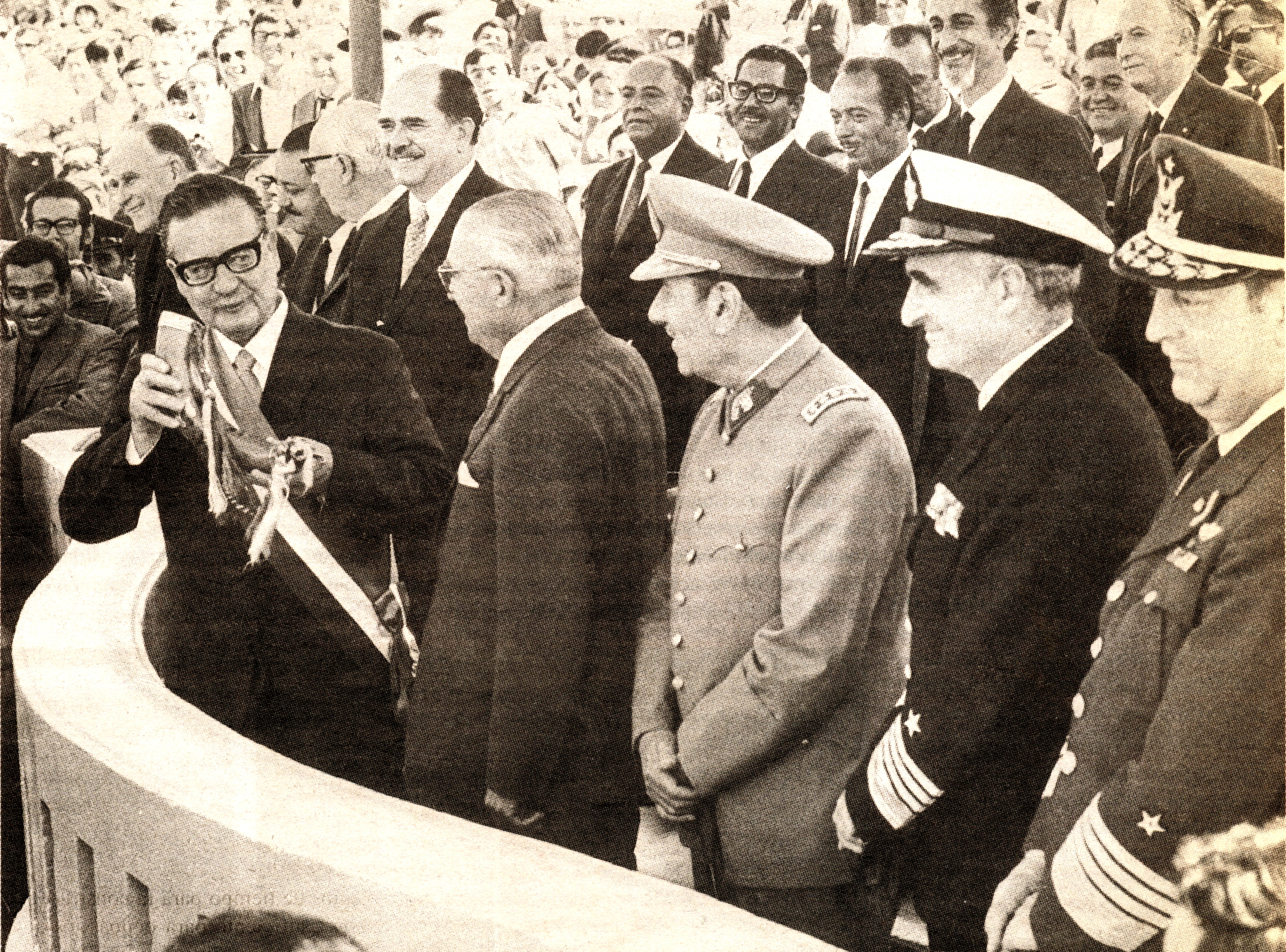
Salvador Allende with Carlos Prats and other commanders of the armed forces of Chile during the Military parade.

Salvador Allende was elected in the 1970 Chilean presidential election. General Prats became the head of the "constitutionalists", members of the armed forces who supported the Schneider Doctrine. With time, he became the army's strongest supporter of President Allende, and was appointed several times as a member of his cabinet. Allende appointed him Vice-President in 1972 (The Chilean Constitution does not have a standing vice-presidential office; rather, the sitting Minister of the Interior, as the senior cabinet minister, is temporarily designated "vice president" during the President's absence on formal State visits abroad).

Prats' reputation was significantly damaged in the Alejandrina Cox incident of June 1973, in which he became involved in an altercation with members of the public and fired a shot at their car. He immediately tendered his resignation, but Allende refused to accept it. Days later, an attempted coup known as the Tanquetazo took place; Prats' rapid response helped to defeat the coup and somewhat restored his public standing.

=== Resignation ===
On August 22, 1973, the wives of Prats' generals and officers staged a rally in front of his home, calling him a coward for not restoring civil order in Chile. This event convinced Prats that he had lost support of his fellow officers. The next day he resigned his positions as Interior minister and as Commander in Chief of the Army. The only two other generals in favor of a constitutional solution to the political crisis, Generals Mario Sepulveda Squella and Guillermo Pickering (both in key troop command positions), also presented their resignations in a show of support for him. General Augusto Pinochet, previously second in command and thought to be loyal to Allende, was appointed Commander in Chief of the Army, taking over the position on August 23, 1973. Prats had personally recommended to Allende to appoint Pinochet to the position.

Prats' retirement removed the last real obstacle to a military coup, which took place less than three weeks later, on September 11, 1973. Immediately after the coup, on September 15, 1973, Prats voluntarily went into exile with his wife in Argentina.

== Death ==
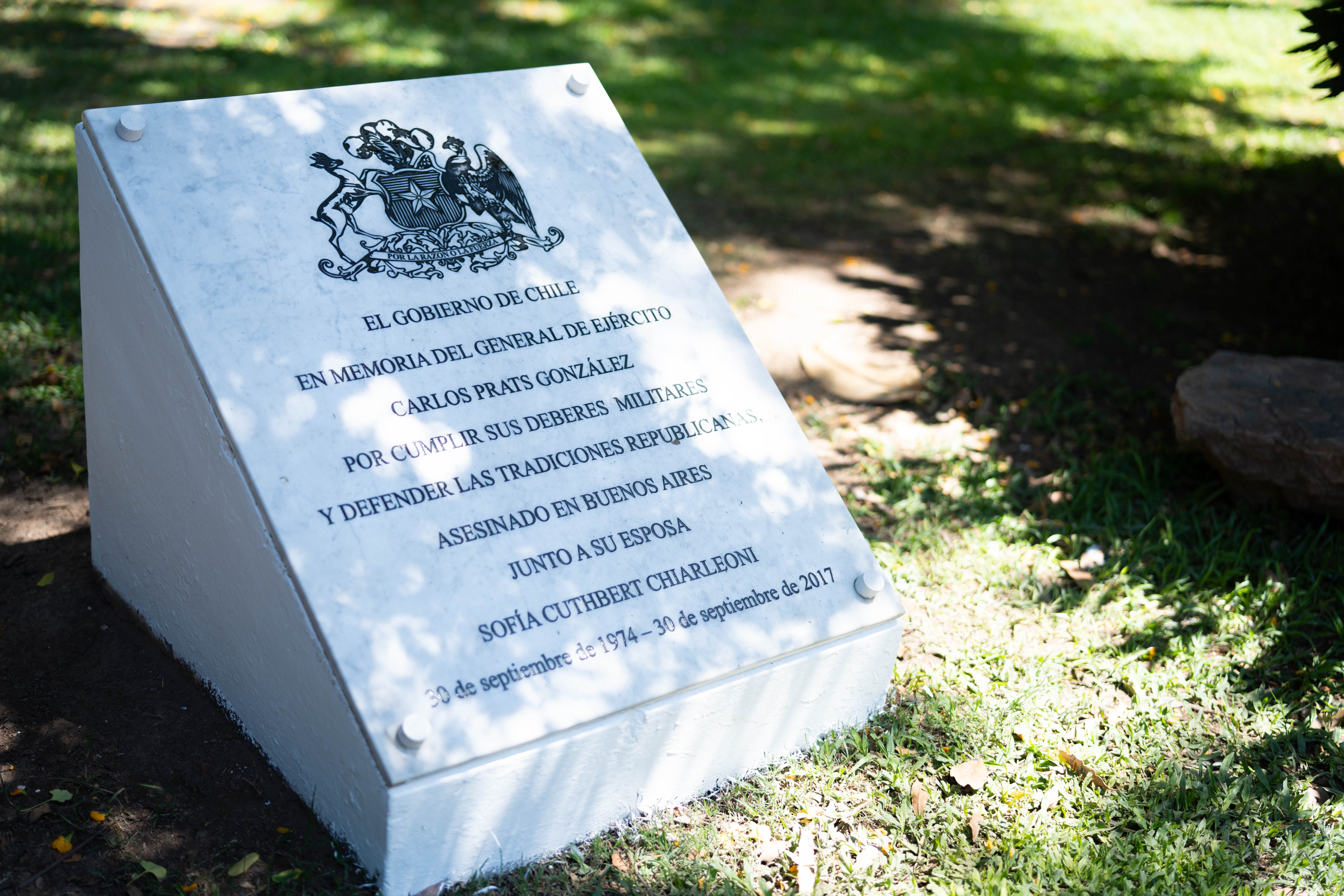
Memorial plaque to Prats and Sofía Cuthbert in Buenos Aires.

On September 30, 1974, in Buenos Aires, Prats and his wife Sofia were killed outside their apartment by a radio-controlled car bomb. Debris reached the ninth-floor balcony of the building across the street.

=== Legal aftermath and investigations ===
In 1983, Michael Townley admitted to his role in carrying out the assassination of Prats on behalf of DINA officials, but was granted immunity from prosecution after entering a plea deal. The former leaders of DINA, including chief Manuel Contreras, ex-chief of operation, and retired general Raúl Iturriaga, his brother Roger Iturriaga, and ex-brigadiers Pedro Espinoza and Jose Zara, were charged in 2003 in Chile with Prats' assassination, and were later convicted. The Chilean judge investigating the case, Alejandro Solis, exempted Pinochet from prosecution after the Chilean Supreme court rejected a request in January 2005 to lift the ex-dictator's immunity.

In Argentina, DINA civil agent Enrique Arancibia was convicted and sentenced to life imprisonment in 2004 for Prats' murder. In 2000, SIDE agent Juan Martín Siga Correa was detained by Argentine officials on the orders of federal judge María Servini de Cubría. Martín Siga Correa was DINA's main connection with the SIDE and with Intelligence Battalion 601, and was also a member of the Tacuara Nationalist Movement.

In 2003, Argentine federal judge María Servini de Cubría asked Chile for the extradition of Mariana Callejas, who was Michael Townley's wife, and Cristoph Willikie Fleent, a retired colonel from the Chilean army; the three together were charged with Prat's murder. But Chilean Appeals court judge Nibaldo Segura refused extradition in July 2005, arguing that the three had already been prosecuted in Chile.

Italian terrorist Stefano Delle Chiaie was reportedly also involved in the murder of Prats. Along with fellow extremist Vincenzo Vinciguerra, Delle Chiaie testified in Rome in December 1995 before Judge Servini that Enrique Arancibia Clavel (a former DINA agent prosecuted for crimes against humanity in 2004) and Michael Townley were directly involved in this assassination.

== See also ==
- Chile under Allende

Political offices
Preceded by Jaime Suárez	Minister of the Interior; 1972-1973	Succeeded by Gerardo Espinoza
Preceded by Clodomiro Almeyda	Minister of Defense; 1973	Succeeded by Orlando Letelier
Military offices
Preceded by René Schneider	Army Commander-in-chief; 1970-1973	Succeeded by Augusto Pinochet
