= Bernardo Leighton =

Chilean politician (1909–1995)

The Honorable Bernardo Leighton
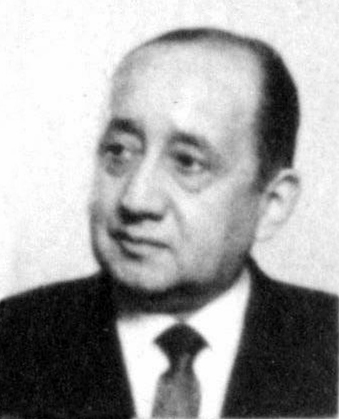
- Leighton in the early 1970s.

Chilean Minister of the Interior
- In office November 3, 1964 – February 5, 1968
- President: Eduardo Frei Montalva
- Preceded by: Sótero del Río
- Succeeded by: Edmundo Pérez Zujovic

Chilean Minister of Education
- In office February 27, 1950 – February 4, 1952
- President: Gabriel González Videla
- Preceded by: Manuel Rodríguez Valenzuela
- Succeeded by: Eliodoro Domínguez

Chilean Minister of Labor
- In office May 24, 1937 – March 12, 1938
- President: Arturo Alessandri
- Preceded by: Roberto Vergara Donoso
- Succeeded by: Juan José Hidalgo

Member of the Chilean Chamber
- In office May 15, 1969 – September 21, 1973
- Constituency: Santiago
- In office May 15, 1945 – May 15, 1949
- Constituency: Antofagasta

Personal details
- Born: Bernardo Leighton Guzmán; August 16, 1909 Negrete, Chile
- Died: January 26, 1995 (aged 85) Santiago, Chile
- Resting place: Parque del Recuerdo
- Party: National Falange (1938–1957); Christian Democratic Party (1957–1978)
- Spouse(s): Ana María Fresno Ovalle (m. 1940–1995); his death
- Parent(s): Bernardino Leighton Gajardo and Sinforosa Guzmán Gallegos
- Education: Pontifical Catholic University of Chile
- Profession: Lawyer
- Website: www.corpbleighton.cl

Bernardo Leighton Guzmán (Note: In this Spanish name, the first or paternal surname is Leighton and the second or maternal family name is Guzmán.) (August 16, 1909, Negrete, Bío Bío Province – January 26, 1995, Santiago) was a Chilean Christian Democratic Party politician and lawyer. He served as minister of state under three presidents over a 36-year career. Exiled as a critic of Augusto Pinochet's dictatorship, he was targeted for assassination by Operation Condor.

== Biography ==
=== Early life ===
Bernardo Leighton was the son of Judge Bernardino Leighton Gajardo and Sinforosa Guzmán Gallegos. He grew up with admiration for his father, a reputed "justice man". Leighton spent his childhood in Los Angeles, Chile, in the Province of Bío Bío. In 1921, Leighton moved to Concepción for studies and an apprenticeship in the lay section of a seminary. In 1922, he moved to Santiago to work in the local Jesuit school, St. Ignacio.

=== Political life ===
As the student leader at the Pontifical Catholic University of Chile, he participated in the 1927 riots against Carlos Ibáñez del Campo's dictatorship, which was deposed in 1931. During the same year, Leighton was sent by the Minister Marcial Mora to Coquimbo to placate the local military riots supported by the population. In 1933, he graduated as a lawyer with a thesis on rural works.

In 1937, Leighton was appointed Minister of Labor by Arturo Alessandri Palma. During this time he founded – along with his friends and associates, Eduardo Frei Montalva, Radomiro Tomic, and José Ignacio Palma – the National Falange which merged with the Christian Democratic Party in 1957. At various times, he served as the party's vice-president.

In 1945, he was elected a deputy in the Chamber of Deputies, for an Antofagasta constituency. Leighton also served as Minister of Education in the Videla Government (1946–1952), and as Minister of the Interior in the Montalva Government (1964–1970).

He was re-elected in 1969, and served as legislator until the Chilean coup d'état of 1973.

=== Exile and assassination attempt ===
Leighton's criticism of the military dictatorship resulted in his exile from Chile. In February 1974, he and his wife fled to Rome, Italy, where he started a campaign against Augusto Pinochet's junta.

According to CIA documents released by the National Security Archive, Italian terrorist and neo-fascist sympathizer Stefano Delle Chiaie met with DINA agent Michael Townley and Cuban Virgilio Paz Romero in Madrid in 1975 to prepare for the murder of Bernardo Leighton with the help of Francisco Franco's secret police. On October 6, 1975, at 8:20 p.m., Leighton and his wife were shot and severely injured. In 1993, A Rome court sentenced Michael Vernon Townley to 18 years imprisonment for attempted murder. Townley had admitted commissioning the murder attempt on behalf of DINA by members of National Vanguard, an Italian right-wing terrorist group. Three members of the group including its leader Stefano Delle Chiaie have been tried for the attack in 1987 and acquitted. Townley's status as a member of witness protection following a previous murder conviction also hindered future cases against him as well.

The day after the attack, Leighton's brain was operated on in an attempt to prevent loss of speech; however, his brain was severely damaged. This event brought about the end of his pacification intentions to reunite the various groups opposing Pinochet, including the leftists.

In 1978, the Chilean government allowed Leighton to return to Chile from Italy, and he retired to private life. He died on January 26, 1995, in Santiago, Chile.

== Personal life ==
On August 15, 1940, Leighton married Ana María Fresno Ovalle, a relative of Juan Francisco Fresno. Ana Maria became a paraplegic due to the murder attempt on the couple in October 1975 and died in 2011. The couple had no children.

== Sources ==
- Carta de Eduardo Frei Montalva a Bernardo Leighton May 22, 1975
- Carta de Bernardo Leighton a Eduardo Frei Montalva June 26, 1975
- "La Tercera" biography
- National Security Archive
