= Villa Grimaldi =

Former political prison in Chile

- Prison camp used during the military dictatorship of Chile
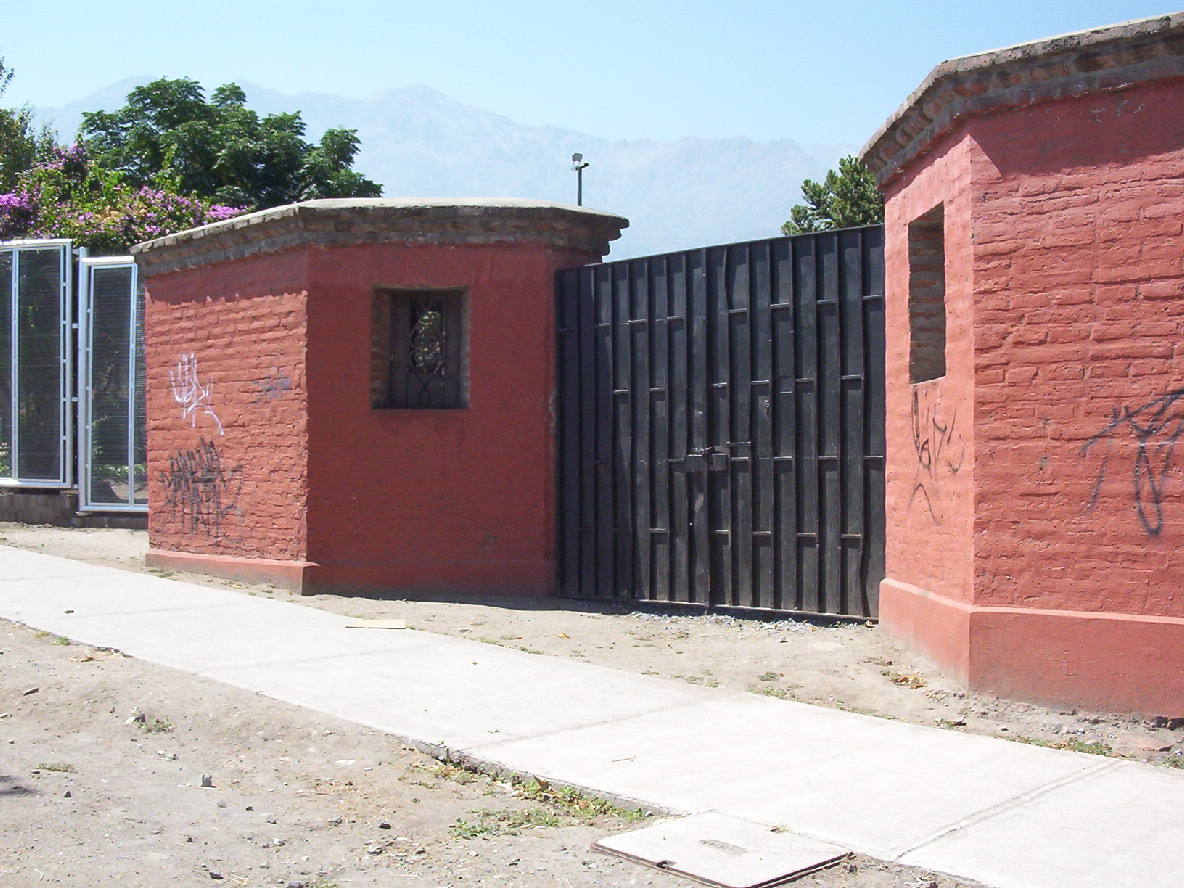
- Old gate entrance to Villa Grimaldi

- Location of Villa Grimaldi in contemporary Chile
- Coordinates: 33°27′49.5″S 70°32′33.5″W
- Known for: Internment of Pinochet's dissidents during his military dictatorship
- Location: Santiago
- Operated by: DINA (when the estate acted as a prison)
- First built: 19th century
- Operational: 1974-1978
- Inmates: Pinochet's dissidents
- Number of inmates: 4500 people
- Killed: At least 226 people
- Notable inmates: Michelle Bachelet; Sheila Cassidy
- Website: http://villagrimaldi.cl/

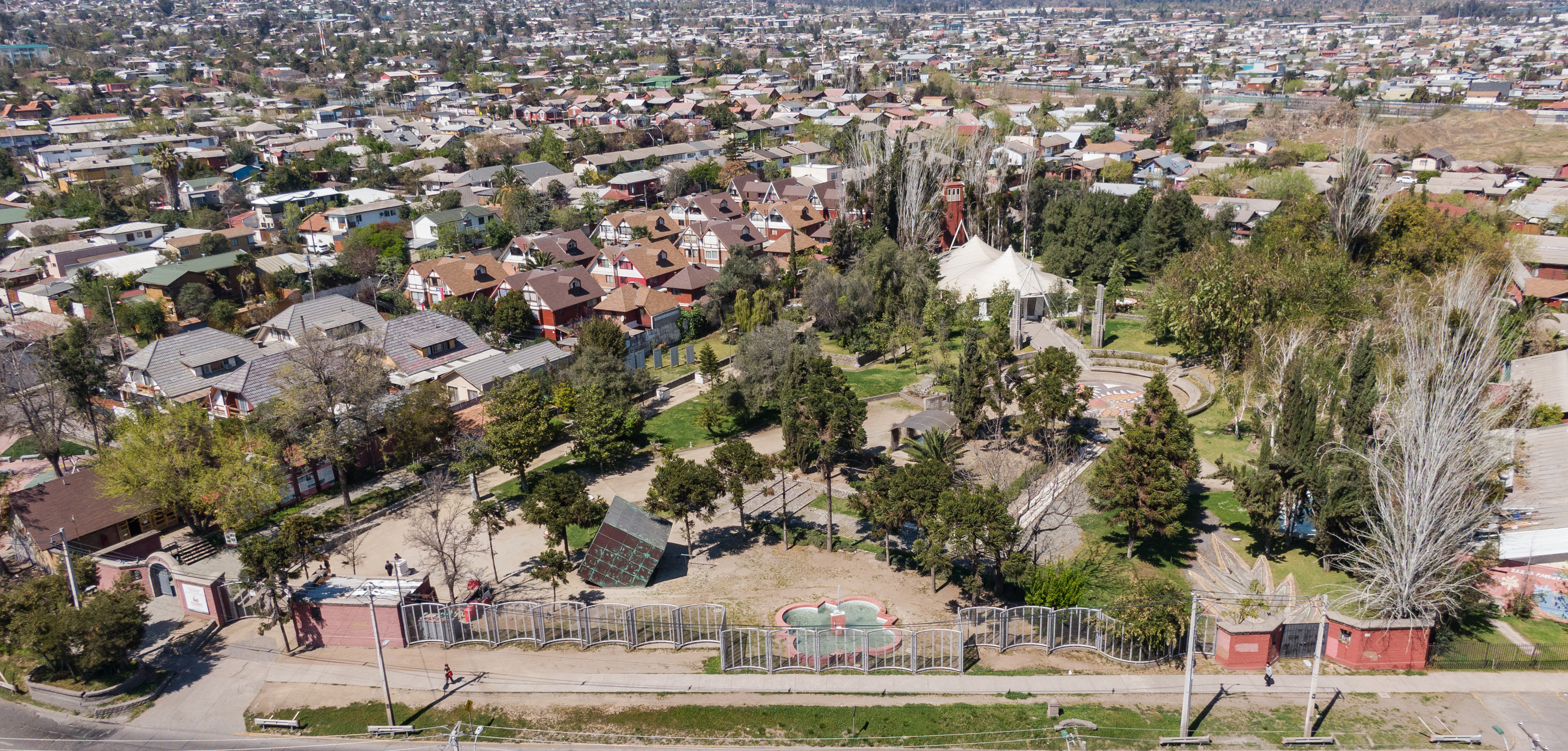
Villa Grimaldi Peace Park

Villa Grimaldi is considered the most important of DINA's many complexes that were used for the interrogation and torture of political prisoners during the governance of Augusto Pinochet. It is located at Avenida José Arrieta 8200 (now 8401) in Peñalolén, on the outskirts of Santiago, and was in operation from mid-1974 to mid-1978. About 4,500 detainees were brought to Villa Grimaldi during this time, at least 240 of whom "disappeared" or were killed by DINA. It was also the location of the headquarters of the Metropolitan Intelligence Brigade (BIM). The head of Villa Grimaldi during the Pinochet dictatorship, Marcelo Moren Brito, was later convicted of crimes against humanity and sentenced to more than 300 years in prison.

== History ==
For most of the 19th and 20th centuries, the three-acre estate was a gathering place for many of Chile's artists and intellectuals. Over the years Villa Grimaldi's various owners hosted parties and cultural events. The structures included meeting rooms, entertainment halls, and a theater, as well as a school that was open to the entire community. It was a gathering place for many left-wing and progressive cultural and political figures during the Popular Unity years, the period associated with the election of Salvador Allende, a Socialist, to Chile's presidency in 1970.

This liberal atmosphere changed suddenly when General Augusto Pinochet seized power in a military coup d'etat on September 11, 1973. Chile's wealthy oligarchy, the Nixon administration, and the Central Intelligence Agency, were among the supporters of Allende's overthrow. The owner of Villa Grimaldi at the time of the coup, Emile Vassallo, was pressured to sell the estate to the new government to protect his family. This is one of the first examples of the state of siege that was enforced under Pinochet for the next 17 years. His regime began to detain thousands of political activists, students, workers, trade unionists, and any other subversive individuals who spoke out against his military government.

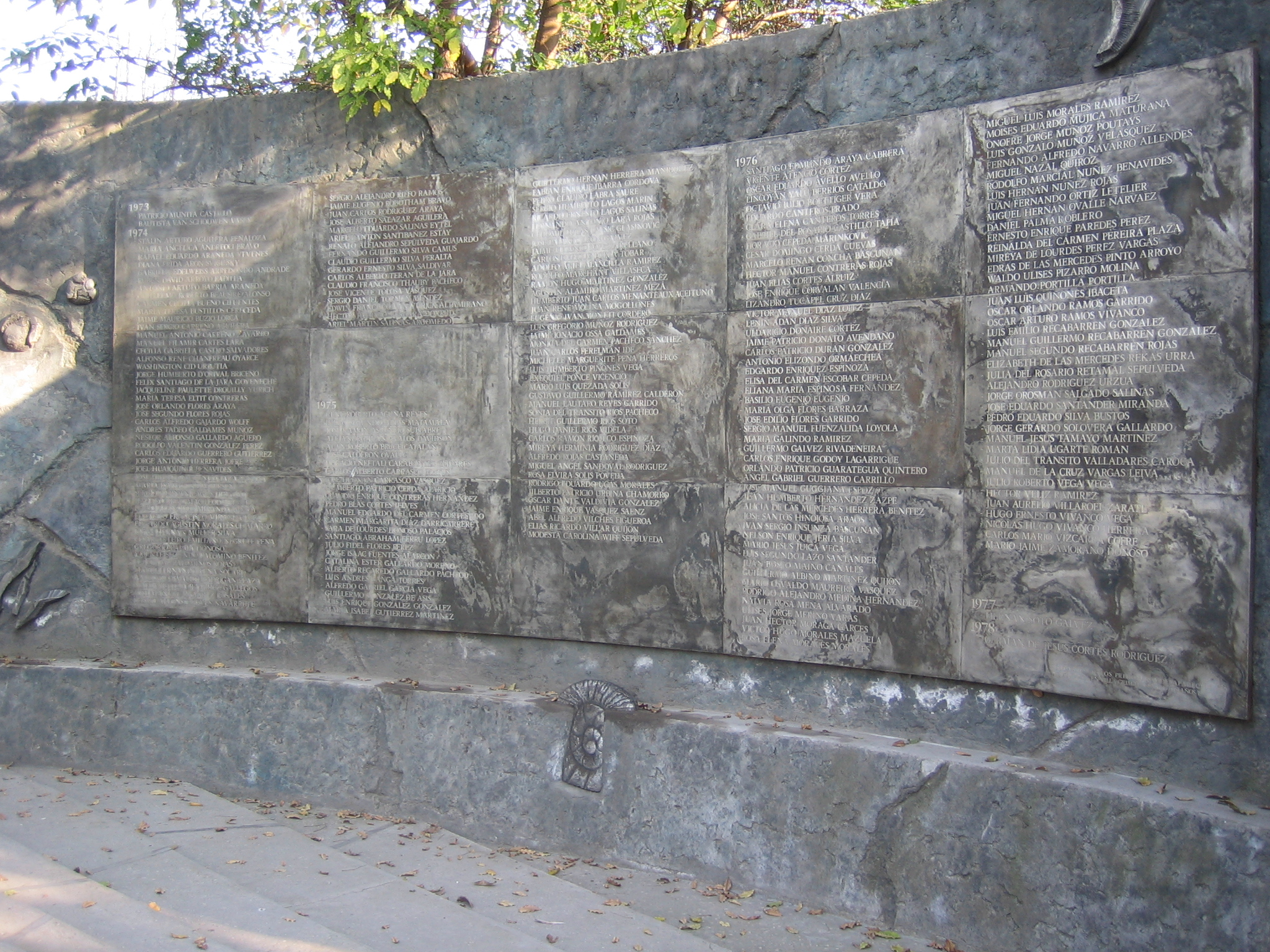
Plaque at Villa Grimaldi with the names of hundreds of people either missing from or killed there by Pinochet's secret police.

Villa Grimaldi was taken over by the DINA, Pinochet's secret police, under Colonel Manuel Contreras and became an interrogation center under the cover of an electrical utility company. It was referred to by the government as Cuartel Terranova but continued to be referred to as Villa Grimaldi by the greater population.

An estimated 4,500 people were detained at Villa Grimaldi, and of those at least 226 "disappeared" forever. Victims included Carlos Lorca, the British physician Sheila Cassidy, the MAPU leader Juan Maino, the CEPAL diplomat Carmelo Soria, and future Chilean President Michelle Bachelet, who was tortured with her mother. Prisoners were supposedly detained for interrogation but their detention usually lasted for long periods of time without explanation and many prisoners were subject to torture. According to the Rettig Report, they were kept in several different living situations: The tower, a tall structure containing ten narrow spaces measuring 70 x 70 centimetres and two metres high in which multiple prisoners were held. The tower also contained a torture chamber. Apparently, people brought to the tower were detainees considered to be of some importance and whose stage of intense interrogation had finished. Many prisoners who went to the tower were never seen again. Chile houses were wooden structures designed for solitary confinement. They consisted of vertical sections similar to closets in which the person had to remain standing in darkness for several days (standing cells). Corvi houses were small wooden rooms built inside a larger room, each containing a bunkbed. This was supposedly where prisoners stayed while they were undergoing intense interrogation and torture.

The forced voyeurism exercised at Villa Grimaldi has been likened to places like Abu Ghraib. Electric shock was the most common form of torture used by agents at Villa Grimaldi. Agents tied naked prisoners to a bare metal bed known as la parrilla, or the grill, and shock devices were attached to sensitive parts of the body such as the lips or genitals. Other torture methods included hanging, underwater asphyxiation, beatings, burning, verbal abuse and general degradation. Detainees were sometimes drugged and hypnotized during interrogations.

By 1978, Villa Grimaldi was no longer a detention center. It was sold to a construction company which demolished the buildings with the intention of redeveloping the estate into a housing complex. La Asamblea Permanente por los Derechos Humanos de Peñalolén y La Reina (The Permanent Assembly for Human Rights of Peñalolen and La Reina) was a community led movement that found out about these plans and initiated a campaign to redevelop the land into a memorial of the lives lost there in the name of human rights and the preservation of historical memory.

Villa Grimaldi as a memorial site was first opened to the community on December 10, 1994. The Villa Grimaldi Peace Park was subsequently opened in March 1997.

Carmen Rojas, a Chilean female revolutionary, is one prisoner whose detention records provide insight into the torture experienced by women at Villa Grimaldi. Sexual torture was used as a mechanism of terror, in which "male torturers threatened women prisoners with rape and humiliated them on the basis of their bodily functions". Torture was used as tool for both emasculation of male subjects and for humiliating female revolutionaries. One instance documented in Rojas's narratives describes an interaction between her and male torturers, who force her to undress, then laugh as they electrocute her and menstrual blood drips down her legs.

== Architecture ==
The property that houses Villa Grimaldi was once privately owned, featuring a main estate and several smaller buildings, including a water tower, barracks for domestic help, and a pool. In its current state, many of the historic features have been removed, but the remnants have been incorporated into the construction of the peace park. Visitors to the current site note being struck by the design's open space. A new building has been reconstructed to resemble The Tower, a multi-tier fifty-foot oak building containing replicas of a series of torture spots, including isolation cells smaller than 91 centimetres (36 in) by 210 centimetres (83 in) in size. These holding areas are even smaller than the quarters for solitary confinement, referred to as las perras (kennels) that were used for prisoners who did not "collaborate enough".

Features of the peace park are oriented in a "+" shape, dividing the park into four corners. In the center there is a water fountain. A path connects the tower to the prison cells, creating a path between torture sites. The other portions of the divided layout connect the entrance of the park to wall of names memorial area. Scholars suggest that the use of the "+" shape branching out from the center is employed to symbolize freedom and purification. Another potential connection is with the slogan "nunca +" (never again, no more), popularly used by the human rights movement during the military dictatorship.

Other elements of the park include el Muro de los Nombres (Wall of Names) and the Memory Room. The wall of names is situated at the far end of the park and expresses a sentiment of privacy and reverence for those who have disappeared. The piece includes names, in addition to dates of birth and death, of prisoners detained at Villa Grimaldi between 1974-1977 and then disappeared by the military. There is seating directly in front of the site wall, situated intentionally to provoke an understanding of the "different affective space this memorial produces as a place of contemplation with no barriers, in private, in solace". Another feature of the park is the Memory Room, which contains mementos, black and white photos, childhood toys, journal entries and other personal items of the individual lives whose last known locations were being detained in Villa Grimaldi.

== See also ==
- Forced disappearance
- Operation Condor
