= Assassination of Carmelo Soria =

1976 murder in Santiago de Chile, Chile

Carmelo Soria (Madrid, 5 November 1921 – Santiago de Chile, 16 July 1976) was a Spanish-Chilean United Nations diplomat. A member of the CEPAL (United Nations Economic Commission for Latin America and the Caribbean) in the 1970s, he was assassinated by Chile's DINA agents as a part of Operation Condor. Augusto Pinochet was later personally indicted over this case.

== Life ==
Carmelo Soria was the nephew of the Spanish urban planner Arturo Soria y Mata. He had three children with his wife Laura González Vera.

After the Spanish Civil War (1936–39), Carmelo Soria, who was a member of the Communist Party of Spain (PCE), exiled himself to Chile, where he obtained double citizenship. He became a UN civil servant in the 1960s. Between 1971 and 1973, during Salvador Allende's rule, Soria temporarily abandoned his functions to become an advisor to the Popular Unity government. In September 1973, after Augusto Pinochet's coup, he re-joined the UN. He then used his diplomatic immunity status to protect opponents of Pinochet by granting them political asylum in various embassies, thus making him a target for the DINA secret police.

On 14 July 1976, he was abducted and his corpse found two days later in a car sunk in the Canal del Carmen in the Pirámide sector of Santiago de Chile. Soria was first detained in the Vía Naranja house in the sector of Lo Curro, shared by DINA agent Michael Townley and where Eugenio Berrios also worked. There, he was tortured and subjected to sarin. Soria was then detained and tortured again in the Villa Grimaldi.

On 18 July 1976, notices of Carmelo Soria's death began to be announced on European radio stations, while it was censored in Chile.

On 4 August 1976, another member of Soria's family, Carlos Godoy Lagarrigue, the son of the ex-rector of the University of Chile and former Minister of Education Pedro Godoy, also "disappeared".

On 15 December 1976, The Washington Post published an article confirming that Soria's death had been caused by torture at the hands of the Chilean authorities, and not a car crash, as pretended by the latter. Despite requests from UN secretary-general Kurt Waldheim made in 1976, the Chilean justice apparatus refused to open new investigations on the case. The Washington Post's informations were confirmed in 1992 by the testimony of DINA agent Michael Townley. Soria's assassination at the hands of the DINA was confirmed by the Rettig Report at the beginning of the Chilean transition to democracy.

== Chilean transition and trials ==
In 1991, during the beginning of the Chilean transition to democracy, the DINA biochemist Eugenio Berríos, already involved in the Letelier case, escaped to Uruguay in order to avoid testifying in both the Letelier case and the Soria case.

In 1994, Carmen Soria, the daughter of the assassinated diplomat, presented a complaint for "assassination" of her father. She then received anonymous calls informing her that the investigations would lead nowhere as the corpse had disappeared from the cemetery. On May 24, 1995, the Supreme Court of Chile would convict both Guillermo Salinas Torres and Ríos San Martín for their roles in Soria's murder. Torres, a former army colonel, was deemed to be a principal perpetrator while Torres, a former sergeant, was deemed to be an accomplice. However, a federal judge vacated the convictions on June 4, 1996, applying the country's April 1978 Amnesty Law. On August 23, 1996, the Supreme Court of Chile affirmed the lower court ruling and closed the case. This led Carmen Soria to present the following year a complaint against Chile before the Inter-American Commission on Human Rights (CIDH), charging it with "denigration of justice." The CIDH thereafter requested Chile to open new investigations and to insure Carmelo Soria's family financial compensation for his murder.

Furthermore, Soria's widow deposed a complaint to the Spanish judge Baltasar Garzón. On 4 May 2001, Garzón ordered the provisional detention of former Chilean Minister of Defence Hernán Julio Brady Roche (1975–1978) on charges of genocide, terrorism and torture in relation to Soria's assassination, and requested his extradition. Brady subsequently denied any knowledge concerning Soria's murder. However, the Audiencia Nacional (high court) archived the case on 31 May 2001, arguing that the Spanish justice was not entitled to pursue the Soria case, despite the universal jurisdiction principle, as it had refused a short time before to pursue Arnaldo Otegi (leader of Batasuna) for an alleged act of "apology of terrorism" committed in France. However, prosecution against Roche and numerous other defendants would get underway in Chile by May 2008. Roche later died in Santiago at the age of 92 in May 2011 while still being prosecuted.

In May 2002, Soria's corpse was exhumed on orders of the magistrate Andrés Contreras, in order to verify his identity. Soria's family had presented a complaint two weeks before concerning "illegal inhumation", alleging that during the transfer of Soria's corpse in 1983, a substitution had been made in order to dispose of his corpse. However the corpse's identity was confirmed in July 2002.

In January 2004, Chilean foreign minister Soledad Alvear signed an agreement with Carmen Soria which promised that a law would be voted concerning the funding of US$1.5 million to Soria's family in reparations of Carmelo Soria's death. Alvear then signed it again in March 2004 before the UN. In July 2007, the Senate ratified this agreement with the UN, by 16 votes for against 14. It had beforehand refused this same agreement, in November 2005.

In October 2005, the family's lawyer, Alfonso Insunza, presented a request before the Chilean justice demanding that the General Eduardo Aldunate Herman, second-in-command of the United Nations Stabilization Mission in Haiti (MINUSTAH), be heard in the Soria case. According to former DINA agent Carlos Labarca Sanhueza's judicial testimony, General Herman was part of the Brigada Mulchén special DINA unit involved in Soria's assassination. The Brigada Mulchén, ultimately placed under the orders of Augusto Pinochet, was found responsible of Soria's assassination by a Chilean Court of Appeal in 1992. Carmen Soria alleged that General Herman was also involved in Eugenio Berríos' assassination at the beginnings of the 1990s as well.

In August 2006, the magistrate Alejandro Madrid, charged with the Soria case, stated that one of the key participant to Soria's assassination, the military officer José Remigio Ríos San Martín, had been detained in 1993 by BIE agents (Batallón de Inteligencia del Ejército, military intelligence agency) in order to convince him to change his judicial testimony. In this statement, Ríos San Martín had accused the Brigadier Jaime Lepe, secretary-general of the Army and a close contact of Augusto Pinochet, and other DINA agents, of being responsible of Soria's death. According to the judge Madrid, the order to detain Ríos San Martín was directly issued by the Brigadier Jaime Lepe, whose promotion to General was blocked in 1997 by the former President Eduardo Frei Ruiz-Tagle in 1997 following denunciations by Carmen Soria. Martin and a co-defendant were previously convicted in 1995, only to then have their convictions dropped the next year due to the country's amnesty law.

According to Ríos San Martín' testimony, the Brigada Mulchén was headed by the then Captain Guillermo Salinas Torre, who ordered Soria's kidnapping. The DINA then believed that Carmelo Soria was a member of the Chilean Communist Party. Ríos San Martín' testimony relaunched the Soria case by confirming previous statements made by Michael Townley at the end of 1992 concerning Soria's abduction.

At behest of one of Soria's relatives, Spanish High Court Judge Pablo Ruz began prosecution proceedings against seven agents of DINA, six Chileans and one US citizen, for genocide and murder charges. It was determined that the crime of genocide may have occurred because the murder of Soria was perpetrated as part of the ‘process of systematic repression and elimination of opponents of the military regime’ undertaken by Pinochet. Ruz argued that Chile's 1978 Amnesty Law was an "obstacle making the effective prosecution of the crime where it took place impossible." In 2009, Spain started prosecution for some of Soria's accused murders. International arrest warrants would be issued for all seven of the genocide and murder suspects in October 2012. All had been members of Mulchen Brigade. However, all of the seven genocide and murder suspects undergoing prosecution under Spanish jurisdiction- Juan Guillermo Contreras Sepúlveda, José Remigio Ríos San Martín, Jaime Lepe Orellana, Guillermo Humberto Salinas Torres, Pablo Blemar Labbe, Patricio Quilhot and Michael Townley- were not extradited from Chile and remained fugitives.

In May 2016, the Chilean Supreme Court asked for the extradition of American Michael Townley, Cuban Virgilio Paz, and Chilean Armando Fernandez Larios for their alleged roles the murder of Soria.

In August 2023, the Supreme Court of Chile affirmed convictions for six former agents of the National Intelligence Directorate and two Army officers for Soria's murder. Among those convicted included Pedro Espinoza Bravo and Raúl Eduardo Iturriaga Neumann. This ruling was regarded as the Supreme Court of Chile's "final conviction" with regards to Soria's murder.

== See also ==
- Augusto Pinochet's arrest and trial
