= Sofía Cuthbert =

Chilean terrorism victim (1918–1974)

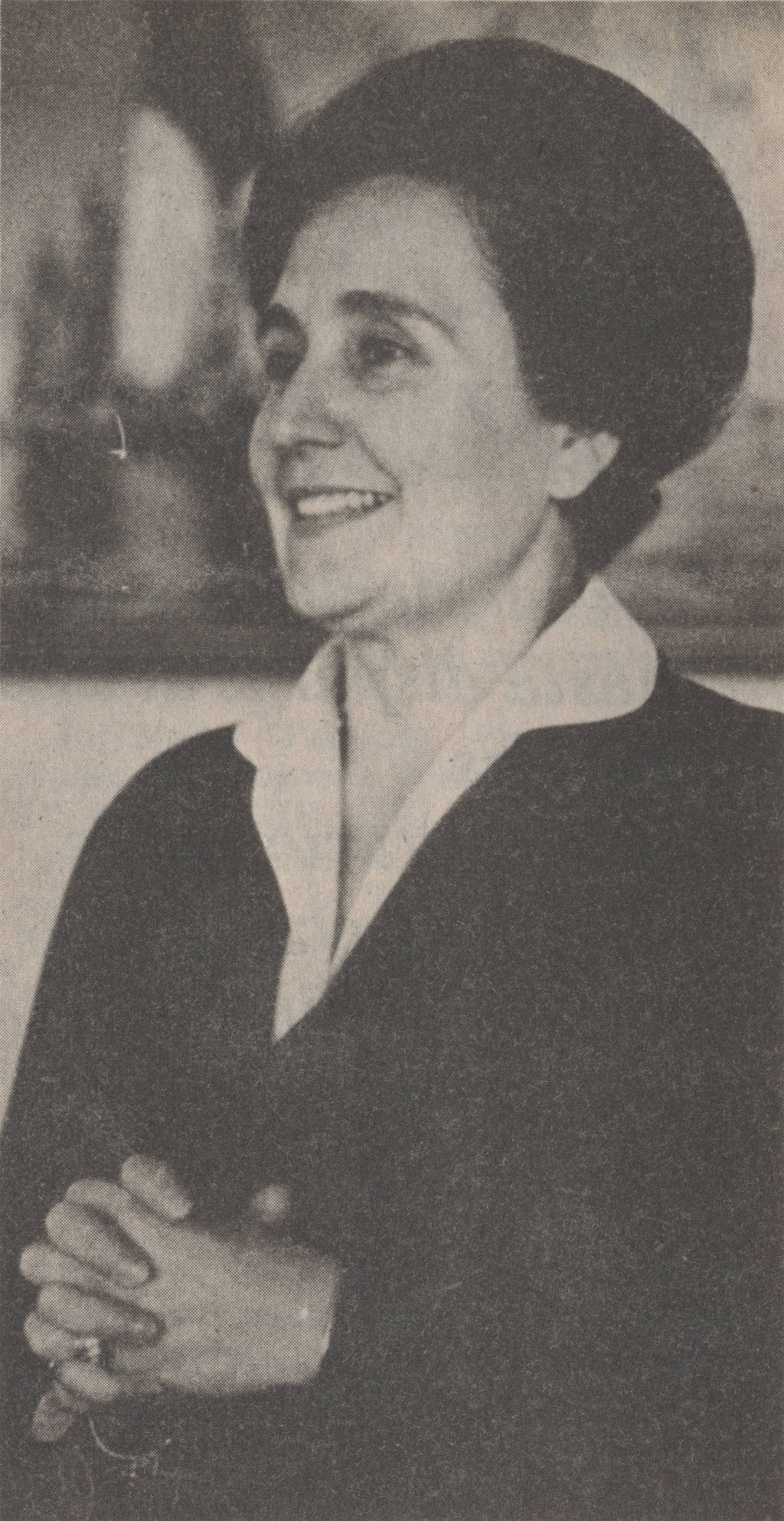
- Cuthbert in 1969
- Born: Sofía Ester Cuthbert Chiarleoni; 28 November 1918; Iquique, Chile
- Died: 30 September 1974 (aged 55); Buenos Aires, Argentina
- Cause of death: Homicide
- Education: Iquique English College
- Spouse: Carlos Prats (m. 1944)
- Children: 3, including Sofía Prats Cuthbert

Sofía Ester Cuthbert Chiarleoni (Iquique, 28 November 1918 – Buenos Aires, 30 September 1974) was the wife of the Chilean General Carlos Prats, murdered along with him in Argentina by the Chilean secret police DINA, Dirección de Inteligencia Nacional, within the framework of Operation Condor.

== Biography ==
Cuthbert was the daughter of William Cuthbert Lister and Sofía Chiarleoni Méndez. She completed her studies at the Iquique English College where she graduated with the title of Executive Bilingual Secretary. Cuthbert was born in Iquique, a large harbour city in the far north, she married there Carlos Prats on 19 January 1944. They have three daughters- Sofía Ester, who has been ambassador of Chile to Greece, María Angélica and Hilda Cecilia. In 1973, the day before the 1973 Chilean coup d'etat, a crowd of wives of many Chilean Army officers visited her house and gave Cuthbert a letter imploring her to push for Prats to resign as the Minister of National Defence "for the sake of so many women who weep".

Cuthbert was murdered alongside her husband by a car bomb in Buenos Aires, where they lived in exile, on 30 September 1974. Prior to her murder, the Dirección de Inteligencia Nacional (the Chilean secret police), had been carrying out surveillance of Cuthbert with them noting down her home and workplace address. For several years, Pinochet could not be tried for the murders under presidential immunity however in 2004, the Santiago Court of Appeal ruled that the immunity should be lifted. However the Supreme Court of Chile reversed this and upheld the immunity.
