= Odlanier Mena =

Chilean general (1926–2013)

Odlanier Rafael Mena Salinas (2 April 1926 – 28 September 2013) was a Chilean general during the military dictatorship of Chile. He was director of the Central Nacional de Informaciones (CNI), a Chilean intelligence agency, between 1977 and 1980. He was convicted for three murders related to the Caravan of Death and was sentenced to six years imprisonment in 2009. From June 2011 onwards he was allowed to stay weekends at his own home. In September 2013 Chilean President, Sebastián Piñera, announced to closure of the Cordillera prison where Mena had been housed. The luxurious conditions at the jail had been criticized, amongst others by former Chilean presidents. According to his lawyer, Mena was worried about moving to a new jail due to a lack of medical attention possibilities. Mena shot himself at his home on 28 September 2013, at the age of 87. His lawyer blamed the suicide on the upcoming relocation of prisoners detained at Cordillera.

Before late 1975 Mena had been head of the Army Intelligence Unit (SIM), when he fell out with Manuel Contreras. In 1975 he retired from the Army. Mena was subsequently made ambassador to Panama and eventually Uruguay. During his time in Uruguay he was recalled to Chile to become head of the CNI. From 1983 to 1985 Mena was ambassador to Paraguay.
