= Tucapel Jiménez =

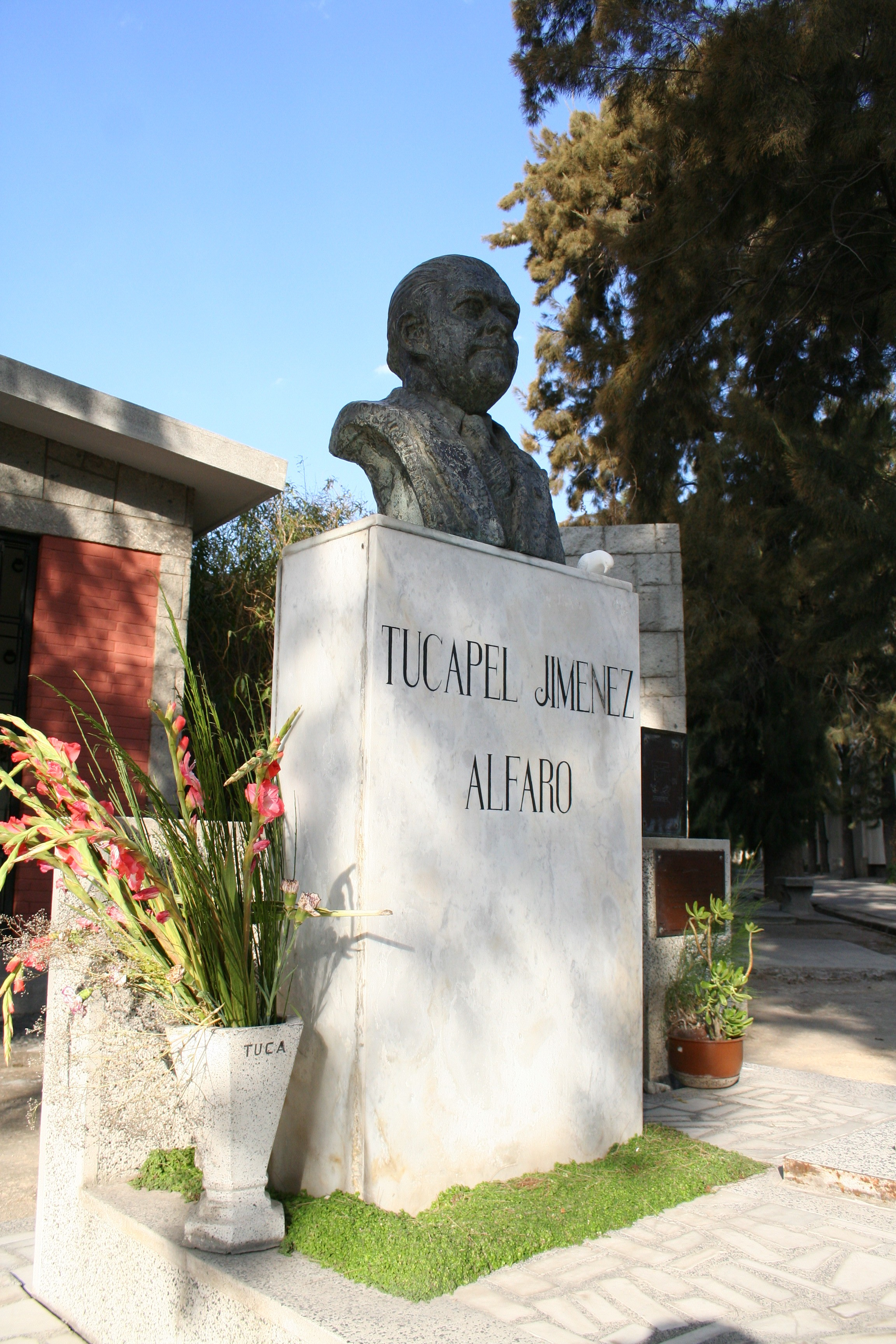
A memorial to Jiménez at the Museum of Memory and Human Rights in Santiago.

Tucapel Francisco Jiménez Alfaro (4 August 1921 – 25 February 1982) was a Chilean trade union leader. Head of the National Grouping of Public Employees (ANEF), he was murdered on 25 February 1982 by the military dictatorship of Augusto Pinochet in the suburbs of Chile's capital, Santiago. His body was mutilated and found by a roadside. His murder was condemned by the International Labour Organization following an investigation. In 2009, 11 Chilean military officials and one civilian were convicted in Jimenez's murder.
