= Virgilio Paz Romero =

Cuban terrorist

Virgilio Pablo Paz Romero (born November 20, 1951) is a Cuban exile and militant who was involved in the 1976 assassination of former Chilean ambassador Orlando Letelier in Washington, D.C. Paz Romero was one of two people accused of detonating a remote-controlled car bomb that killed Letelier and a colleague in Washington's Sheridan Circle.

== Early life ==
Paz's family left Santa Clara, Cuba, in the mid-1960s when he was 14. In 1966 while his family was in Mexico City awaiting papers to emigrate to the United States, Paz's father died. He settled in a Cuban community in New Jersey with his mother. When he was 16, Paz was the youngest member of the Cuban Nationalist Movement.

== Assassination of Orlando Letelier ==
On September 21, 1976, Orlando Letelier drove colleagues Michael and Ronni Moffitt to work at the Institute for Policy Studies in his Chevrolet Chevelle. Paz and Jose Dionisio Suarez Esquivel followed in a sedan. Paz detonated a bomb placed under Letelier's car as it reached Sheridan Circle on Washington's Embassy Row. The blast killed Letelier and Ronni Moffit.

=== Capture ===
Paz Romero, his wife, a son and a daughter lived under assumed names in the area of West Palm Beach, Florida since 1980. Taking the name "Francisco Luis (Frank) Baez", Paz Romero was active in the community and owned a landscaping business in Boynton Beach, Florida since 1985. On April 24, 1991, he was captured without incident while driving to work a few days after he was profiled on an episode of America's Most Wanted. The segment featured an age progressed portrait of Paz Romero drawn by forensic artist Karen T. Taylor.

=== Sentencing and imprisonment ===
In July 1991, Paz Romero pleaded guilty in the conspiracy to assassinate Letelier, and on September 13, 1991, he was sentenced to 12 years in prison. He was paroled after serving half of his sentence, and an immigration judge ordered him deported. Given that the United States did not have a deportation agreement with Cuba, he was placed into indefinite custody of the Immigration and Naturalization Service. In July 2001 after the Supreme Court of the United States ruled that indefinite detentions were unconstitutional, Paul Huck of the United States District Court for the Southern District of Florida ordered Paz Romero released.

=== Deportation proceedings ===
In January 2026, Paz Romero was detained as a result of the second Trump administration's efforts to deport "noncitizen immigrants convicted of felonies", according to The Washington Post. He was held in an immigrant detention center in Miami, and as of September 2026, is awaiting deportation.

== Alleged involvement in murder of Carmelo Soria ==
In May 2016, the Supreme Court of Chile voted unanimously to request that the United States extradite Paz, Chilean Armando Fernandez Larios, and American Michael Townley who were wanted for the July 1976 detention, torture, and murder of Carmelo Soria, a Spanish-Chilean citizen and United Nations diplomat. The three men were former agents of Augusto Pinochet's secret police Dirección de Inteligencia Nacional. By August 2023, however, it was reported that a recent conviction which was given to six former DINA agents and two former army officers would be the "final conviction" issued by the Supreme Court of Chile for Soria's murder.
