= María Romilda Servini =

Argentine lawyer and judge (born 1936)

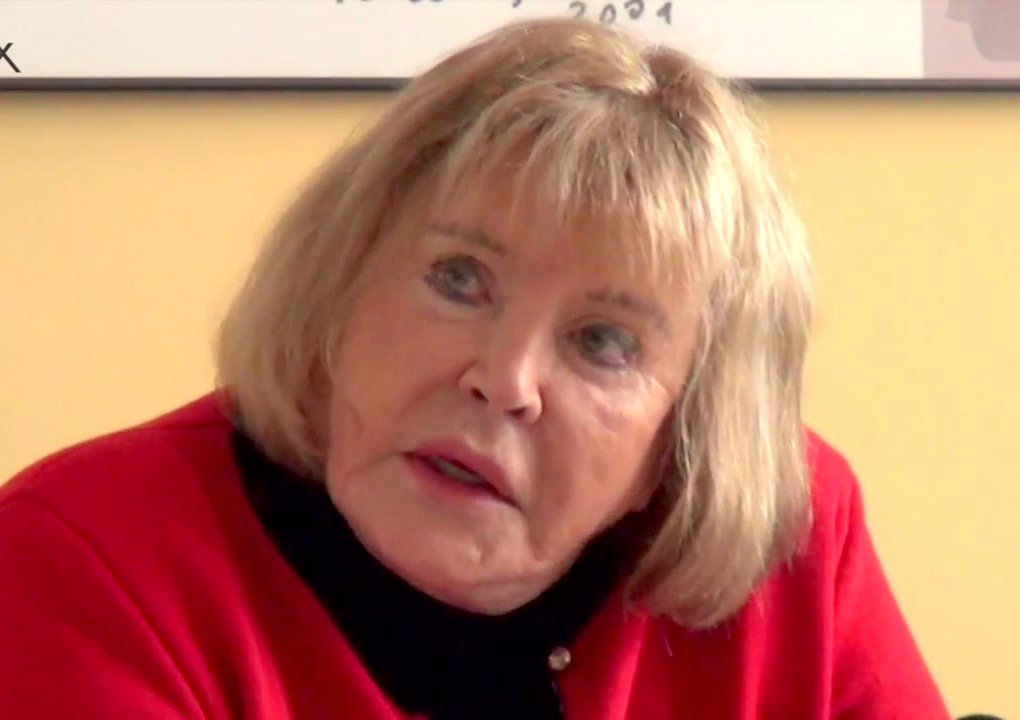

Federal Judge of Argentina for Court No. 1 of Buenos Aires
- Incumbent
- Assumed office 19 November 1990
- Nominated by: Carlos Menem

Personal details
- Born: 1 December 1936 (age 89) San Nicolás de los Arroyos, Argentina
- Spouse: Juan Tomás Cubría
- Education: University of Buenos Aires
- Occupation: Judge, lawyer

María Romilda Servini de Cubría (born 1 December 1936) is an Argentine lawyer and judge who presides over Federal Court No. 1 of Buenos Aires.

== Early life ==
María Romilda Servini was born in the city of San Nicolás de los Arroyos, in the extreme north of Buenos Aires Province, to an upper middle class family. As a child, she was nicknamed "Chuchi".

She studied law at the University of Buenos Aires, where she met Juan Tomás Cubría in 1958. One year later they were married, had a son, and he was appointed military attaché in Rio de Janeiro, where the couple lived for two years.

== Judicial career ==
When they returned to Argentina, Servini de Cubría finished her studies as a clerk and worked in this capacity during 1966 in the offices of Buenos Aires Province. When she had her second child, she decided to finish law school with her brother, who was also attending.

She began her judicial career, working her way up from the lowest position to that of "official defender". In that position she had her first prominent case, in which she had to defend former President Isabel Perón, who had been arrested and prosecuted on several criminal counts by the National Reorganization Process that was in power at the time. After Perón was overthrown by the dictatorship, her husband, who was a captain of the Air Force, was forced into retirement by the decision of General Ramón Agosti.

Later she was named "judge of minors", and there she took charge of several cases of appropriation of children, being the first to return children to families of the disappeared. She was later investigated for having designated minors for adoption in an irregular manner, similar to that which caused fellow judge Gustavo Mitchell to resign in November 2011. Servini disputed the allegations and questioned the impartiality of Judge Norberto Mario Oyarbide.

In the 1980s, she was subrogated judge in a court of higher education. There, she presided over the Puccio family's case.

=== Yomagate ===
On 19 November 1990, then-President Carlos Menem appointed her a national judge in Criminal and Correctional Court No. 1 with electoral jurisdiction. She presided over the case known as Yomagate, which accused Amira Yoma – the President's sister-in-law – of laundering money from drug trafficking.

In 1992 she filed a judicial appeal to censor the comedian Tato Bores for a satirical sketch he was about to perform on his television program. A civil court ruled in her favor, and the order not to use her name was applied to the well-known humorist. In response, a chorus of celebrities (including Mariano Grondona, Alejandro Dolina, Susana Giménez, China Zorrilla, Magdalena Ruiz Guiñazú, Luis Alberto Spinetta, Ricardo Darín, and Víctor Hugo Morales) dedicated a song with the refrain "Judge Baru Budu Budía is the greatest there is."

=== Assassination of Chilean General Carlos Prats ===
On 9 November 1999, Servini de Cubría questioned Michael Townley, a former member of the Dirección de Inteligencia Nacional (DINA). For the first time he not only confessed how General Carlos Prats and his wife were murdered, but also how he fled Chile in 1973 to avoid arrest after the murder of a worker in the facilities of the TV channel of the Catholic University in Concepción. The latter deed earned him admittance to immediately join the DINA's secret squads.

=== December 2001 riots ===
Judge Servini de Cubría issued orders to police during the 20 December 2001 demonstrations in the Plaza de Mayo. She later initiated the prosecution of Secretary of Security Enrique Mathov, Federal Police chief Rubén Santos, and police commissioners Jorge "El Fino" Palacios, Raúl Andreozzi, and Norberto Gaudiero on five counts of "culpable homicide", accusing them of "propitiating through their ineptitude the episodes of generalized violence that went on in those days."

=== Demand to Google and Yahoo! ===
In 2008, the judge filed an appeal to block access to any information and images of herself existing in the search engines Google and Yahoo! that did not have her consent. However, the National Chamber of Civil and Commercial Appeals decided to withdraw the request.

=== 2013 judicial reform ===
In June 2013 Judge Servini de Cubría issued the "Rizzo" ruling which declared unconstitutional the reform of the magistracy council, called "democratization of justice" by the ruling party. The decision was later confirmed by the Supreme Court.

=== Franco era court actions ===
In the 2010s an Argentine court accused Antonio González Pacheco, a former police inspector, of committing criminal acts in Francoist Spain. He was sought for extradition in 2014, by Servini. The request for extradition was refused by the Spanish High Court on the basis that the statute of limitations had run out on the accusation against him.

In September 2013, Servini de Cubría opened a case to investigate the alleged "baby theft" that occurred, according to the complainants, in Francoist Spain. On 31 January 2014, the first complaints of Spanish residents were received after the authorization of the Argentine consulate in Madrid.

=== 2015 transfer of power ===
In December 2015, Servini de Cubría, as a result of an action initiated by the Cambiemos alliance, issued a declaratory sentence that established a time for the end of the term of President Cristina Fernández de Kirchner, and the beginning of that of Mauricio Macri.

=== Resignation ===
On 26 December 2017 María Romilda Servini de Cubría resigned from her position on the federal court with electoral jurisdiction in Buenos Aires Province, citing "strictly personal reasons".

== Personal life ==
In September 2016 Servini de Cubría underwent coronary angioplasty for a thrombosis at the Argentine Diagnostic and Treatment Institute.

She and her husband Juan Tomás Cubría have two children, Eduardo Cubría and Juan Carlos Cubría.

In April 2021, she tested positive for COVID-19 and was admitted to the intensive care unit at the Sanatorium Otamendi in Buenos Aires. She had previously received her first dose of the COVID-19 vaccine Sputnik V and was critical of President Alberto Fernández over the handling of the vaccination program.

== See also ==
- Carmen Argibay
- Elena Highton de Nolasco
