= Manuel Contreras =

Chilean general (1929–2015)

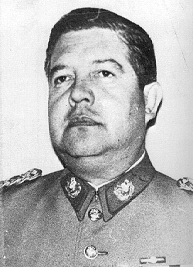
- Manuel Contreras
- Born: Juan Manuel Guillermo Contreras Sepúlveda; 4 May 1929; Santiago, Chile
- Died: 7 August 2015 (aged 86); Santiago, Chile
- Other name: El Mamo
- Known for: Head of secret police
- Status: Deceased
- Conviction: Crimes against humanity
- Penalty: 529 years imprisonment

Juan Manuel "Mamo" Guillermo Contreras Sepúlveda (4 May 1929 – 7 August 2015) was a Chilean Army officer and the former head of the National Intelligence Directorate (DINA), Chile's secret police during the dictatorship of General Augusto Pinochet. In 1995, he was convicted of the murder of Chilean diplomat Orlando Letelier in Washington, D.C., and sentenced to seven years in prison, which he served until 2001. At the time of his death, Contreras was serving 59 unappealable sentences totaling 529 years in prison for kidnapping, forced disappearance, and assassination.

== Early life ==
Contreras was the son of Manuel Contreras Morales and Aída Sepúlveda Cubillos. His parents died when he was six or seven years old. He completed his primary studies at the English Institute of Macul in Santiago. Afterward, his father relocated to Osorno, where he enrolled in the Lyceum of that city.

== Career ==
Contreras enrolled in the Military School in 1944 and graduated with top honors on 23 December 1947. In 1952, after achieving the rank of lieutenant, Contreras returned to the Military School, this time joining the Company of Engineers as a sapper instructor.

In 1953, Contreras married María Teresa Valdebenito Stevenson. During the same year, he became part of the newly-established San Antonio School of Engineers.

In 1960, Contreras enrolled in the War Academy to undertake the General Staff Officer course. It was there that he met Captain Augusto Pinochet, who served as the deputy director of the academy and taught strategy classes. Pinochet's lectures were often centered around his concerns about the success of the Cuban Revolution.

Contreras successfully completed the General Staff Officer course at the War Academy in 1962, ranking first in his class. He was also appointed as a professor at the academy, teaching intelligence and logistics. In 1966, he returned to the academy, this time as a professor of intelligence.

== Under Allende's government ==
In 1967, Contreras completed a Postgraduate Course as a General Staff Officer at the School of the Americas in Fort Gulick, located in the Panama Canal Zone. During his time there, Contreras became familiar with the repressive tactics employed against opposition groups.

Upon returning to Chile in 1969 with a major's degree, Contreras assumed the role of an intelligence instructor at the Tejas Verdes School of Engineers. In 1970, he was appointed Secretary of the Army General Staff, and in 1971, he became the director of the Engineer Regiment No. 4 Arauco in the city of Osorno. It was during this period that he, along with a group of colonels and captains, began gathering information and devising an intelligence apparatus capable of infiltrating and dismantling leftist organizations.

Contreras established a network of informants in Chile, which included individuals affiliated with right-wing parties and groups like the Nationalist Front Fatherland and Liberty (Frente Nacionalista Patria y Libertad, FNPL). Simultaneously, he maintained contacts with agents from the CIA and the Naval Intelligence Office in Valparaíso and San Antonio, who were active in Chile at the time. These contacts provided him with manuals utilized by the secret police of various countries, such as the KCIA of South Korea, the SAVAK of Iran, and the National Information Service of Brazil.

A significant portion of Contreras's focus revolved around formulating strategies to neutralize or undermine the industrial unions in which the Movement of the Revolutionary Left (MIR), the Socialist Party, and to a lesser extent, the MAPU, wielded considerable political influence.

By the end of 1972, Contreras was not only overseeing the Tejas Verdes School of Engineers but also instructing at the War Academy.

== Dirección de Inteligencia Nacional (DINA) atrocities ==
In part of his legal confessions, American-born Dirección de Inteligencia Nacional (DINA) operative Michael Townley described Contreras as the "intellectual author" behind the atrocities committed by DINA. In his March 13, 1978 "confession," Townley detailed how his many missions for DINA, which even included Operation Condor operations in Europe and the assassinations of Orlando Letelier and Ronnie Moffitt, were carried out "following orders from Gen. Contreras.” In a letter which Townley wrote to Contreras on March 1, 1978 under the alias J. Andres Wilson, he referred to him as "Don Manuel" and even indicated his belief that Contreras had not “let his Excellency [Pinochet] know the truth about this case” when he discussed the Letelier-Moffitt assassination.

In March 1978, Michael Townley sent a letter to Manuel Contreras in which he said

I accept that there are things to do and it's better not to inform higher ups. But in my judgement, the physical elimination abroad, with all its risks and possible consequences, especially in the U.S., where there is perhaps the best police force in the world, is not one of them. [...] In my judgement the greatest error has been not informing his Excellency, the truth and real magnitude of this problem. Without this, his Excellency was unable to act or give someone the necessary authority to act [...] So, I support: 1- That if his Excellency is presented with the truth, it is possible and probable that you will be removed from every position, where the Government can be protected. 2- The way that this problem has gone and is going, the Government will fall beyond help as a result of the F.B.I. discovering the truth, by the anger of the Cubans, by the U.S. breaking relations, by the opposition group here discovering the truth, etc., etc. (There are not enough fingers to cover the hole, that the dike has). So, I ask you: 1- To tell his Excellency the truth of this situation, so that he can use his authority as he can.

— "Dear don Manuel" letter, Michael Townley, 1978.

In April 1978, Generals Manuel Contreras and Odlanier Mena met with the Junta to resolve the matter of Townley’s extradition to the U.S., and it was stated in the meeting that neither the Junta nor Pinochet himself knew of Townley’s existence. General Contreras lied and assured them he had no connection to Townley, something he also denied three times in 1976 and claimed that Townley had never worked for the Chilean intelligence and that, in the worst-case scenario, he might have acted as an informant. Based on those assurances, he was handed over to the U.S. Since Townley also participated in the assassination attempts on Prats and Leighton, and Pinochet was accused by the U.S. justice system of the attack on Orlando Letelier. The U.S. intelligence believed the attack on Letelier was ordered by Pinochet, without knowing the details of the Dina-Junta meetings.

In the Michael Townley trial, and interviews, attributed responsibility for the orders to the DINA. In contrast, Chilean military officers Raúl Iturriaga Neumann and Manuel Contreras claimed that the assassination orders received by Townley in the various Chile-related cases came exclusively from the CIA, questioning his account and accusing him of lying to implicate the DINA and Pinochet, a thesis that Townley anticipated and explicitly denied in his private confessions.

== Operation Condor ==
From 1973 to 1977, Contreras led the agency in an international pursuit to locate and eliminate political opponents of the Junta, specifically targeting members of the Communist and Socialist Parties, as well as the former guerrilla group and political party MIR. On November 25, 1975, during Pinochet's 60th birthday, leaders of the military intelligence services of Argentina, Bolivia, Chile, Paraguay, and Uruguay convened with Contreras in Santiago de Chile to establish the Plan Condor officially. The report "CIA activities in Chile," released on September 19, 2000, reveals that despite Contreras's involvement in human rights abuses, the US government policy community authorized the CIA's engagement with him from 1974 to 1977 to fulfill their mission in Chile. By 1975, American intelligence reports had identified Contreras as the main obstacle to implementing a rational human rights policy within the Pinochet government. However, the CIA received instructions to maintain its association with Contreras and even provided him with a one-time payment in 1975. The CIA became troubled by Contreras's alleged role in the assassination of Orlando Letelier, a former Allende cabinet member and ambassador to Washington, as well as his American assistant, Ronni Karpen Moffit, in Washington, D.C., on September 21, 1976. Although the CIA reportedly obtained specific and detailed intelligence suggesting Contreras's involvement in ordering the Letelier assassination, this material remains classified and has been withheld at the request of the US Department of Justice (CIA, 2000). The CIA continued its contacts with Contreras until 1977.

It took me four years to pacify this country.

— Manuel Contreras, 10 September 2013

After the assassination of Orlando Letelier, tensions between Contreras and Pinochet escalated during Contreras' tenure. As a result, the Dirección de Inteligencia Nacional (DINA) was shut down in 1977, and a new organization called the National Informations Center (CNI) took its place.

In 1976, Contreras, along with Gerhard Mertins, Sergio Arredondo, and an unidentified Brazilian general, traveled to Tehran. Their purpose was to propose a collaboration with the Shah regime to eliminate Carlos the Jackal. The exact details of the meetings and their outcomes remain unknown.

In 1978, Michael Townley agreed to an extradition to the United States in large part to seek protection from Contreras and Pedro Espinoza.

By 1979, Contreras had retired from the army, holding the rank of general until his death.

== Prison sentences and court investigations ==
On 13 November 1993, a Chilean court sentenced Contreras to seven years of prison for the Letelier assassination. He was freed on bail following the conviction, but the Supreme Court of Chile confirmed the sentence on 30 March 1995. Contreras rebelled against the sentence by fleeing to Southern Chile, and then to a military regiment and later a military hospital. After two months, seeing his support from the army vanish, he resigned and was sent to a military prison, where he completed his sentence on 24 January 2001 and was freed.

In May 2002, Contreras was convicted as the mastermind of the 1974 abduction and forced disappearance of the Socialist Party leader Victor Olea Alegria. He received 15 years in prison on 15 April 2003 for the disappearance of the tailor and MIR member Miguel Ángel Sandoval in 1975, but the sentence was reduced on appeal to 12 years. Also in 2003, he was sentenced to 15 years of prison for the 1974 disappearance of journalist Diana Frida Aron Svigilsky. He was amnestied in 2005, but the Supreme Court overturned that decision and confirmed the judgment against Contreras on 30 May 2006. He received another 15-year prison sentence on 18 April 2008 for the disappearance of the political dissident Marcelo Salinas Eytel.

Contreras was also convicted by an Argentine court in connection with the assassination of the former Chilean army chief Carlos Prats and his wife, Sofía Cuthbert in Buenos Aires, in 1974. An extradition request by Argentina was denied by Chile, but on 30 June 2008, a Chilean court gave Contreras two life sentences for the assassination of Prats and his wife, along with a 20-year sentence for conspiracy.

Contreras was sentenced on 23 September 2008 to seven years of prison in connection with the disappearance of the Spanish priest Antonio Llidó Mengual. He was ordered to pay 50 million pesos to compensate for the 1974 abduction of Felix Vargas Fernandez and received another 15 years of prison at a March 2009 sentencing. On 6 July 2012, he received an additional 10 years in prison over the detention and disappearance of the ex-militants José Hipólito Jara Castro and Alfonso Domingo Diaz Briones in 1974. In total, his sentences over the years totaled more than 500 years in prison.

In September 2013, under the orders of President Sebastián Piñera, the luxurious Penal Cordillera, in eastern Santiago, was closed, and Contreras was transferred back to Punta Peuco in Tiltil, north of the capital.

=== Accusing Pinochet ===
On 13 May 2005, Contreras submitted to Chile's Supreme Court a 32-page document that claimed to list the whereabouts of about 580 people who disappeared during Pinochet's rule. Human rights groups immediately questioned the information and its source and cited Contreras's years of deception and denials of responsibility for human rights abuses. Many of the details he provided were previously known, and some contradicted the findings of commissions that have investigated the disappearances. In the document, he wrote that Pinochet had personally ordered the repressive measures. During the same May 2005 hearing to the Supreme Court, Contreras directly accused the CIA and the Cuban terrorist Luis Posada Carriles in the 1976 assassination of Orlando Letelier.

Contreras accused Pinochet of having given the order to assassinate Orlando Letelier and Carlos Prats. He also declared to Chilean justice in 2005 that the CNI, the successor of DINA, handed out monthly payments between 1978 and 1990 to the persons who had worked with DINA agent Michael Townley in Chile, all members of Patria y Libertad, the far-right movement that had been involved in the Tanquetazo : Mariana Callejas (Townley's wife), Francisco Oyarzún, Gustavo Etchepare and Eugenio Berríos. Assassinated in 1992, Berríos, who worked as a chemist for the DINA in Colonia Dignidad, also worked with drug traffickers and DEA agents.

Pinochet died at the age of 91 on 10 December 2006, before any court could convict the former dictator of crimes related to his military rule.

== Illness and death ==
During his final years, Contreras underwent thrice-weekly dialysis sessions at Santiago's Military Hospital. On August 25, 2014, he was admitted to the hospital due to kidney problems and remained hospitalized. As his condition deteriorated, he was eventually transferred to the intensive care unit. On August 7, 2015, Contreras died at the hospital. His cause of death was not disclosed by the hospital authorities. Following the announcement of his demise, a demonstration of several dozen people took place in front of the hospital, where they chanted "Murderer!" and raised toasts to his death with champagne. Hundreds of people gathered at Plaza Italia, a central square in Downtown Santiago, to celebrate the news.
