= Human rights abuses in Chile under Augusto Pinochet =

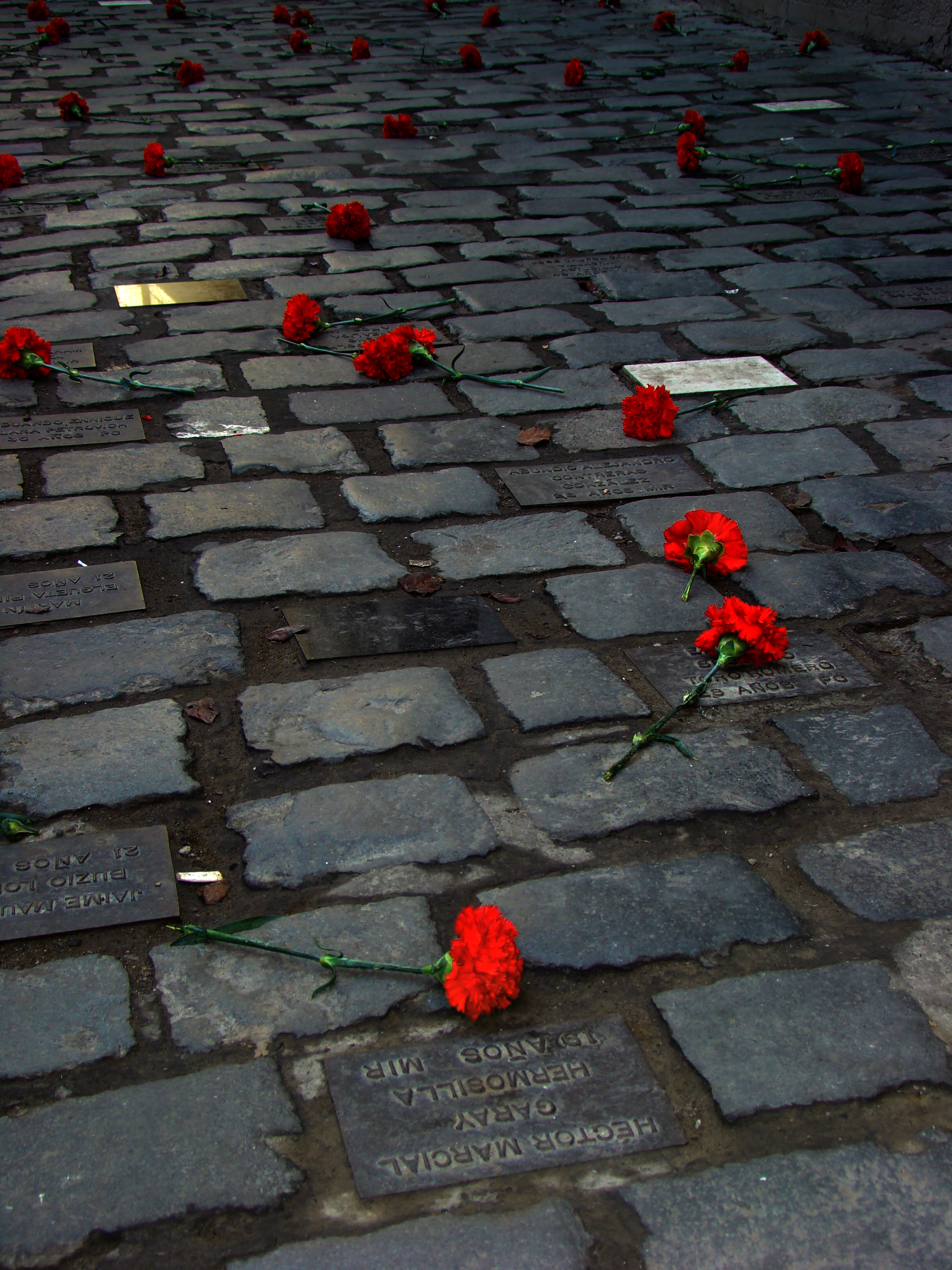
Commemoration and homage to the victims and survivors of the Pinochet regime. The enclosure that can be seen in the image corresponds to Londres 38, the clandestine detention and torture center of DINA, the regime's secret police.

Human rights abuses in Chile under Augusto Pinochet were the crimes against humanity, persecution of opponents, political repression, and state terrorism committed by the Chilean Armed Forces, members of Carabineros de Chile and civil repressive agents (members of a secret police), during the military dictatorship of Chile under General Augusto Pinochet from 1973 to 1990.

According to the Commission of Truth and Reconciliation (Rettig Commission) and the National Commission on Political Imprisonment and Torture (Valech Commission), the number of direct victims of human rights violations in Chile accounts for around 30,000 people: 27,255 tortured and 2,279 executed. In addition, some 200,000 people suffered exile and an unknown number went through clandestine centers and illegal detention.

The systematic human rights violations that were committed by the military dictatorship of Chile, under General Augusto Pinochet, included gruesome acts of physical and sexual abuse, as well as psychological damage. From 1973 to 1990, Chilean armed forces, the police and all those aligned with the military junta were involved in institutionalizing fear and terror in Chile.

The most prevalent forms of state-sponsored torture that Chilean prisoners endured were electric shocks, waterboarding, beatings, and sexual abuse. Another common mechanism of torture employed was "disappearing" those who were deemed to be potentially subversive because they adhered to leftist political doctrines. The tactic of "disappearing" the enemies of the Pinochet regime was systematically carried out during the first four years of military rule. The "disappeared" were held in secret, subjected to torture and were often never seen again. Both the National Commission on Political Imprisonment and Torture (Valech Report) and the Commission of Truth and Reconciliation (Rettig Report) approximate that there were around 30,000 victims of human rights abuses in Chile, with 40,018 incidents of torture and 2,279 executed. The following people have been identified, along with many others, as victims of the Pinochet regime:

- Diana Aron, journalist
- Miguel Enriquez, political activist
- Victor Jara, singer-songwriter and poet
- Jose Liendo, left-wing militant
- Carlos Lorca, political activist
- Reinalda Pereira, doctor and trade unionist
- Arsenio Poupin, politician
- Elizabeth Rekas, social worker
- Alfredo Rojas, engineer and politician
- Bautista van Schouwen, doctor and political activist
- Franco Teruggi, writer and trade unionist

== History ==
He shut down parliament, suffocated political life, banned trade unions, and made Chile his sultanate. His government disappeared 3,200 opponents, arrested 30,000 (torturing thousands of them) ... Pinochet's name will forever be linked to the Desaparecidos, the Caravan of Death, and the institutionalized torture that took place in the Villa Grimaldi complex.

— Thor Halvorssen, president of the Human Rights Foundation, National Review

The military rule was characterized by systematic suppression of all political dissidence, which led some to speak of a "politicide" (or "political genocide"). Steve J. Stern spoke of a politicide to describe "a systematic project to destroy an entire way of doing and understanding politics and governance."

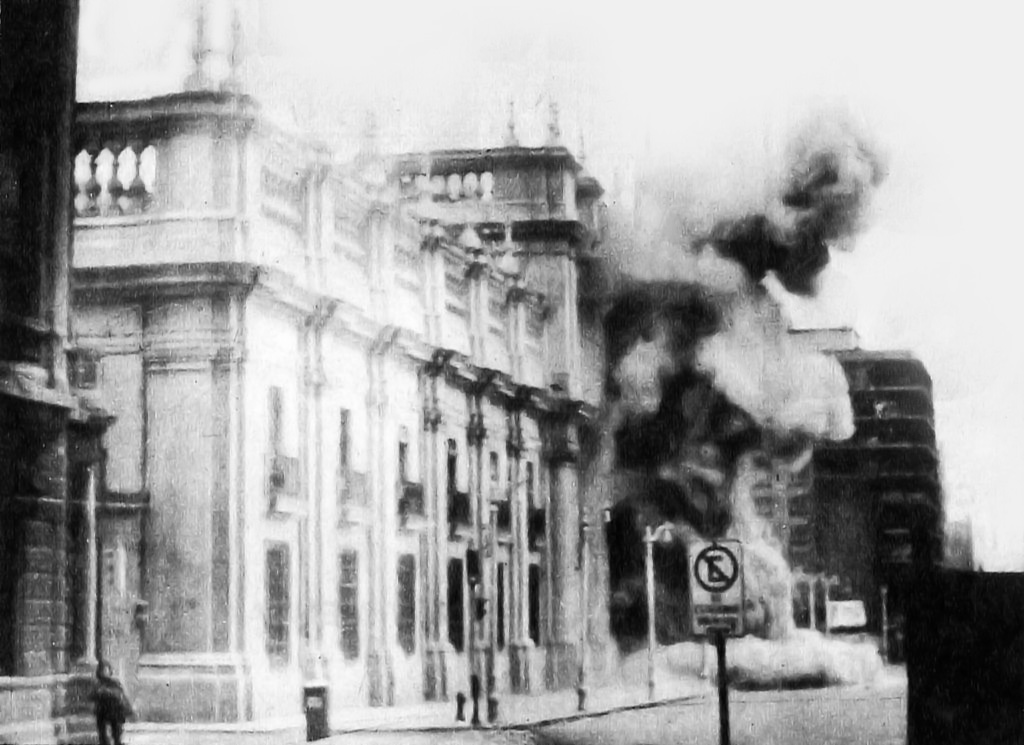
Bombing of the La Moneda Palace during the 1973 coup d'état.

The worst violence occurred in the first three months of the coup's aftermath, with the number of suspected leftists killed or "disappeared" (desaparecidos) soon reaching into the thousands. In the days immediately following the coup, the Assistant Secretary of State for Inter-American Affairs informed Henry Kissinger that the National Stadium was being used to hold 5,000 prisoners, and as late as 1975, the CIA was reporting that up to 3,811 prisoners were still being held in the Stadium. Amnesty International reported that as many as 7,000 political prisoners in the National Stadium had been counted on 22 September 1973. Nevertheless, it is often quoted in the press that some 40,000 prisoners were detained in the Stadium. Some of the most famous cases of "desaparecidos" are Charles Horman, a U.S. citizen who was killed during the coup itself, Chilean songwriter Víctor Jara, and the October 1973 Caravan of Death (Caravana de la Muerte) where at least 70 persons were killed. Other operations include Operation Colombo during which hundreds of left-wing activists were murdered and Operation Condor, carried out with the security services of other Latin American dictatorships and the aid of the CIA.

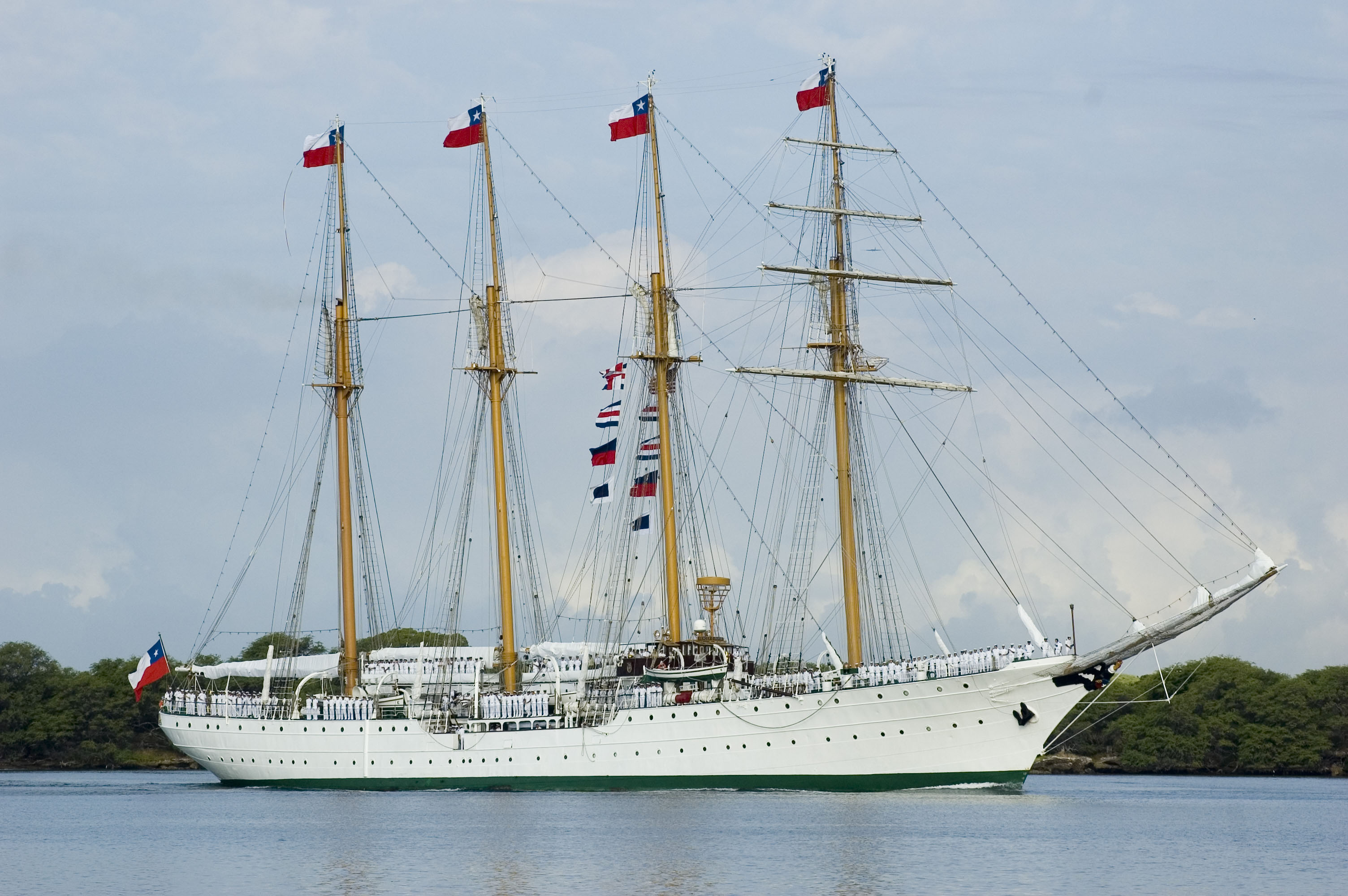
Training ship Esmeralda, used in 1973 as a detention and torture center.

Following Pinochet's defeat in the 1988 plebiscite, the 1991 Rettig Commission, a multipartisan effort from the Aylwin administration to discover the truth about the human rights violations, listed a number of torture and detention centers (such as Colonia Dignidad, the ship Esmeralda or Víctor Jara Stadium), and found that at least 3,200 people were killed or disappeared by the regime.

A later report, the Valech Report (published in November 2004), confirmed the figure of 3,200 deaths but dramatically reduced the alleged cases of disappearances. It tells of some 28,000 arrests in which the majority of those detained were incarcerated and in a great many cases tortured. Some 30,000 Chileans were exiled and received abroad, in particular in Argentina, as political refugees; however, they were followed in their exile by the DINA secret police, in the frame of Operation Condor which linked South-American dictatorships together against political opponents. Some 20,000–40,000 Chilean exiles were holders of passports stamped with the letter "L" (which stood for lista nacional), identifying them as persona non grata and had to seek permission before entering the country. Nevertheless, Chilean human rights groups maintain several hundred thousand were forced into exile.

According to the Latin American Institute on Mental Health and Human Rights (ILAS), "situations of extreme trauma" affected about 200,000 persons; this figure includes individuals killed, tortured (following the UN definition of torture), or exiled and their immediate relatives. While more radical groups such as the Movement of the Revolutionary Left (MIR) were staunch advocates of a Marxist revolution, it is currently accepted that the junta deliberately targeted nonviolent political opponents as well.

A court in Chile sentenced, on 19 March 2008, 24 former police officers in cases of kidnapping, torture and murder that happened just after a U.S.-backed coup overthrew socialist President Salvador Allende on 11 September 1973.

== Bureaucratic authoritarianism ==
The concept of bureaucratic authoritarianism characterizes the military regimes that rose to power in South America between the 1960s and 1980s, specifically in the Southern Cone regions of Argentina, Chile, Paraguay, and Uruguay. These regimes had a technocratic approach to policy-making and were accompanied by substantial repression. Guillermo O'Donnell—a prominent Argentine political scientist— labeled these regimes as "bureaucratic authoritarian" in order to "distinguish them from oligarchical and populist forms of the authoritarian rule found in less modernized countries".

From its inception on 11 September 1973, the Chilean bureaucratic authoritarian regime's ultimate agenda was to repress political dissidents—which some have classified as "politicide" (or "political genocide"). General Pinochet's assumption of power through a violent and bloody military coup d'état foreshadowed the brutal conditions that many innocent people would endure over the next 17 years. Pinochet genuinely feared the supporters of the Popular Unity Party (PU) and its leader Salvador Allende, who had been the first Marxist to become President of a Latin American region through open elections. General Pinochet lived in a state of paranoia, and constantly feared being assassinated or losing power. Thus, he set out to destroy those who were not in unity with his policies, particularly those who had once served the PU.

As Pinochet's suspicions grew, the military dictator targeted anyone who was in some way associated with the "leftists", which even included the mothers, wives, and children of the potential subversives. In order to legitimize control of the country, Pinochet created institutions that were seemingly democratic. He organized a plebiscite, held on 11 September 1980, which approved a new Constitution that went into effect on 21 October 1980, and that validated the legal system he had established by decree. The Constitution proscribed an eight-year election period, permitted reelections and gave the President of the Republic an immense amount of power. Laws were passed to criminalize acts of terror and limit the use of habeas corpus. A crucial aspect of the Pinochet regime was how unified the military was. Another was the disarray of civilian society, which created an atmosphere that was conducive to repressing all those who supposedly supported the PU, other leftist organizations, and even centrist institutions like the Christian Democratic Party.

== Instilling a sense of fear ==
=== Caravan of Death ===
From the moment Pinochet assumed power, he wanted to instill a sense of fear in the Chilean population. These fears manifested with his authorization of the "Caravan of Death". Following the coup on 11 September, Pinochet ordered this Chilean Army death squad to target the leaders of the PU by any means necessary. The Caravan of Death, under the leadership of Sergio Arellano Stark, killed 68 people within three days, by stabbing, beating, and shooting them. The establishment of the Caravan of Death served three main purposes: 1) silence dissent through murder, 2) weed out military officials who were not aligned with Pinochet's regime and 3) establish fear within leadership ranks. The Caravan of Death resulted in the institutionalization of a state-sponsored system of terror.

=== DINA ===
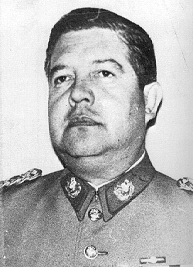
Manuel Contreras, director of the National Intelligence Directorate (DINA).

On 14 June 1974, Junta Decree 521 mandated the creation of the National Intelligence Directorate (DINA). There were thousands of people working in this agency. DINA was instituted to "produce the intelligence necessary to formulate policies and planning, and to adopt measures to procure the safeguarding of National Security and development of the country". DINA established interrogation and detention camps, in which former members of Allende's Marxist government and the Leftist movements like the Movimiento de Izquierda Revolucionaria were incarcerated and brutally tortured. Pinochet's goal was to annihilate all forms of opposition. He therefore greatly supported Military Decree 1697, which outlawed the formation of any political party. A large proportion of the Chilean population was vulnerable to surveillance. Chile's churches, universities, businesses, and neighborhoods were all under intense scrutiny.

=== Joint Command ===
The Joint Command operated as a de facto institution from late 1975 until late 1976 and was based primarily in Santiago, Chile. Like DINA, this institution coordinated intelligence activities and political repression, with the Air Force having a major role in carrying out its agendas. The Joint Command was responsible for "disappearing" approximately 30 people during the bureaucratic authoritarian era.

== State-sponsored torture and repression ==
From 1974 to 1977, DINA and other agencies such as the Joint Command were the main institutions responsible for committing most acts of repression. It was during this period when most of the forced disappearances took place. While these agencies committed barbaric acts of physical and sexual torture, they also caused an immense amount of psychological pain and suffering.

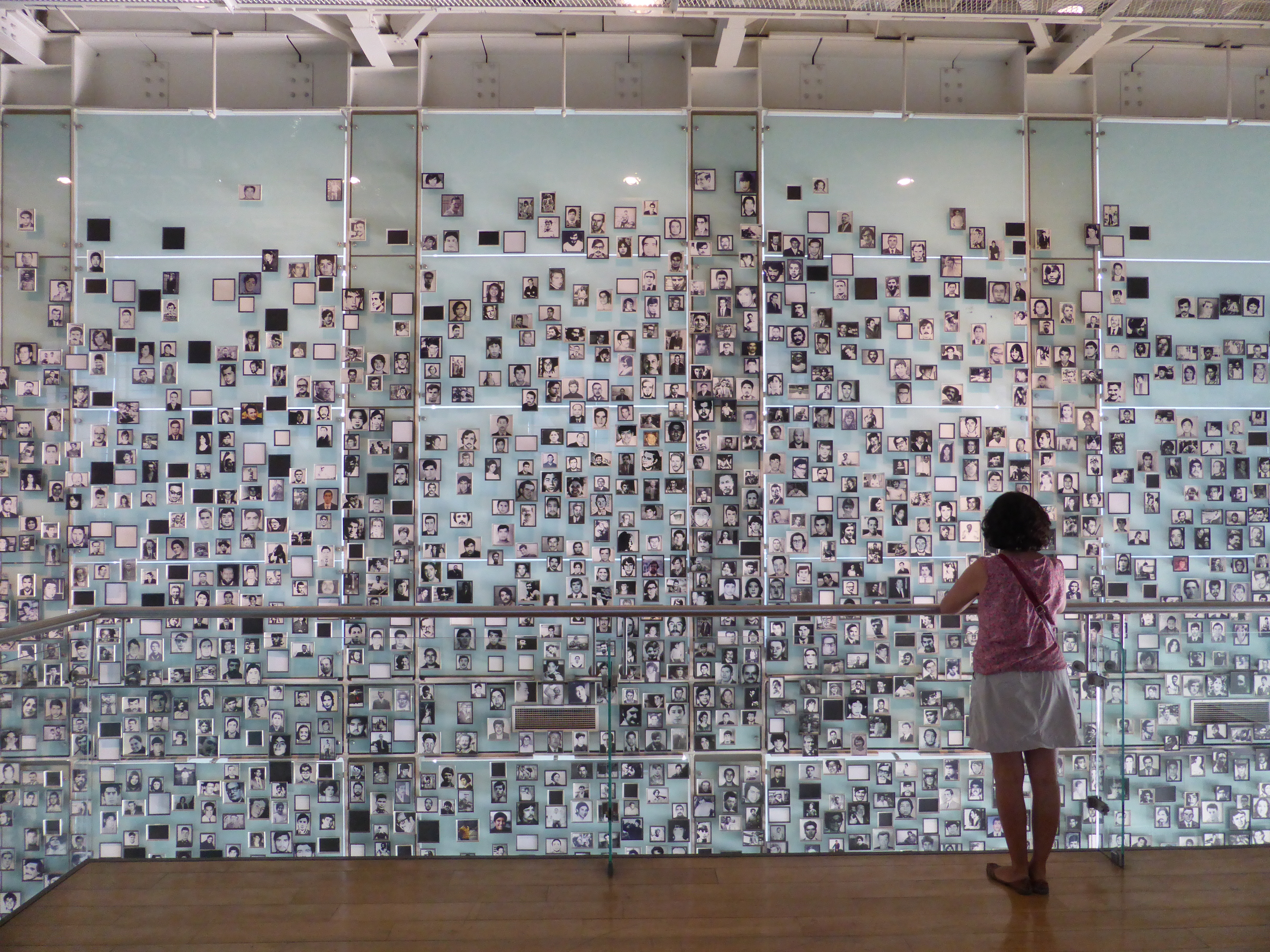
Photographs of victims of Pinochet's regime.

=== Detentions and torture centers ===
Intelligence agencies under Pinochet's regime instituted secret detention and torture sites to conduct political repression. In total, Chile had 17 torture centers. On occasion, prisoners were released after being confined and tortured. However, many detainees were also killed and "disappeared".

==== Cuatro Álamos ====
Cuatro Álamos was a detention center to which no one outside the DINA had access, except personnel from other intelligence agencies. It was established in 1973, during the earliest phase of the regime. Life in Cuatro Álamos was relatively easier than in other detention sites. It consisted of twelve small cells, one large cell, and staff offices. There were very few instances of torture within the walls of the prison.

==== Londres 38 ====
Londres 38 was a secret detention center located in downtown Santiago, where DINA members operated from 1973 until the end of 1974. This was one of the many sites previously owned by leftist organizations. Prisoners at Londres No. 38 endured lengthy interrogation periods and continual humiliating treatment. Captors preferred to torture detainees by electrocuting them. Not only were the suspects incarcerated, but their relatives were also arrested. Family members underwent sexual abuse in the presence of their loved ones. However, during the initial period, prisoners were still permitted to interact with each other and share information.

==== Villa Grimaldi ====
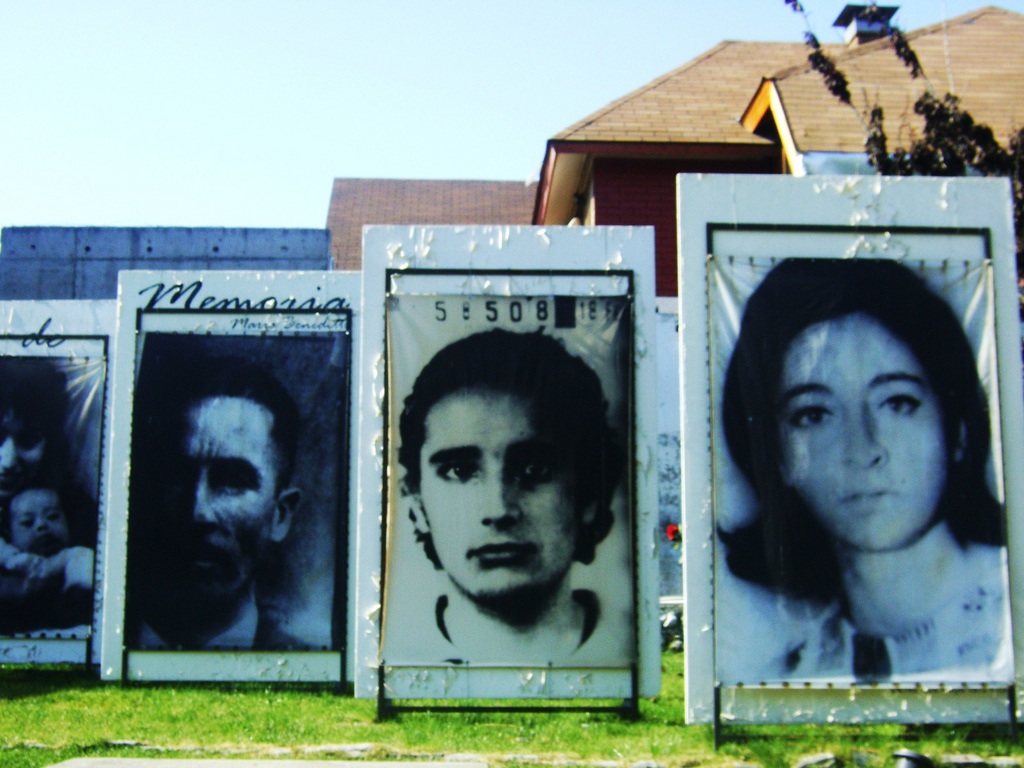
Disappeared people in art at Parque por la Paz at Villa Grimaldi in Santiago de Chile.

Villa Grimaldi, located in Santiago, was DINA's most important torture center, which began operating in 1974. Prisoners endured long periods of interrogation. As more people were incarcerated on a massive scale, new places were reconditioned to hold them. The "tower" was designated as a holding center for political prisoners. On the top floor of the building, there was a water tank that included ten tight spaces where prisoners were held. These spaces were so small that victims had to enter them by crawling on their knees. The tower also housed a torture chamber, where prisoners were kept in isolation. Many of them were never seen again. Food was scarce, and the conditions were extremely unsanitary.

=== Physical torture ===
One commonly used torture method was the "grill" or "La Parrilla." In this method, electricity was supplied from a standard wall outlet through a control box into two wires, each terminating in electrodes. The control box allowed the torturers to adjust the voltage administered to the prisoner. The naked prisoner would be stretched out, strapped onto a metal bedframe or a set of bedsprings, and securely fastened. They were then subjected to electrical shocks on various parts of the body, particularly sensitive areas like the genitals and open wounds.

The Valech Report includes the testimony of a Chilean man who was interrogated by prison captors. They removed his clothes and attached electrodes to his chest and testicles. They also placed something in his mouth to prevent him from biting his tongue while they administered shocks. In another variation of this method, one wire would be attached to the prisoner, typically to the victim's genitalia, while another wire could be applied to different parts of the body. This created an electric current passing through the victim's body, with the strength inversely proportional to the distance between the two electrodes. A smaller distance between the electrodes resulted in a stronger current and therefore more intense pain for the prisoner.

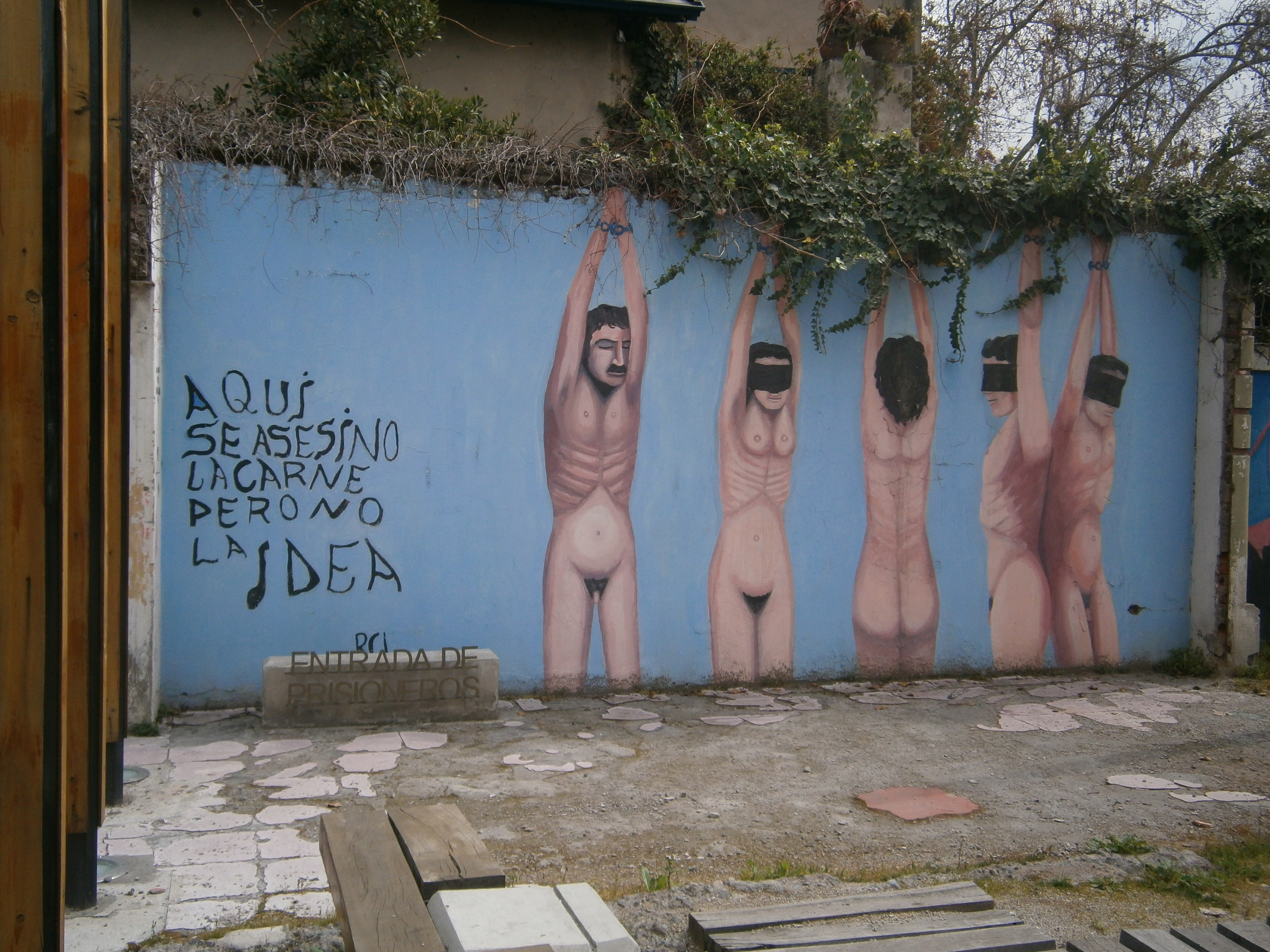
DINA's torture center at José Domingo Cañas 1367.

A particularly brutal version of the "grill" involved the use of a metal bunk bed; the victim would be placed on the bottom bunk while a relative or friend was simultaneously tortured on the top bunk. Most prisoners endured severe beatings, and some had their limbs broken or amputated.

At Villa Grimaldi, DINA forced non-compliant prisoners to lie down on the ground. The captors would then run over their legs with a large vehicle, crushing the prisoners' bones. The assailants also beat prisoners in the ears until they became deaf and unconscious; this torture method was known as the "telephone". Most of these acts of punishment were intended to humiliate the prisoners severely.

At the Pisagua Concentration Camp, captors intimidated prisoners by forcing them to crawl on the ground and lick the dirt off the floors. If prisoners complained or even collapsed from exhaustion, they were promptly executed. Prisoners were also immersed in vats of excrement and occasionally forced to ingest it.

=== Sexual abuse ===
Pinochet's regime perpetrated numerous gruesome and horrific acts of sexual abuse against its victims. Several detention sites were established solely for the purpose of sexually tormenting and humiliating the prisoners. One such facility was the Discothèque (or Venda Sexy), which served as one of DINA's primary secret detention centers. Many of those who "disappeared" were initially held in this prison, where prison guards frequently subjected both men and women to sexual assault. This prison also served as the central hub for internal repression operations.

Women were the primary targets of these gruesome acts of sexual abuse. According to the Valech Commission, almost every single female prisoner fell victim to repeated rape. Military personnel not only raped women but also employed foreign objects and even animals to inflict additional pain and suffering. Women, and occasionally men, reported incidents where spiders and live rats were implanted on their genitals. One woman testified that she had been "raped and sexually assaulted with trained dogs and live rats" and was forced to engage in sexual acts with her father and brother, who were also detained.

In the words of Alejandra Matus, detained women endured a double punishment: first for being labeled as "leftists" and second for not conforming to the military's ideal of women, often being derogatorily referred to as perra ("bitch").

=== Psychological repression ===
The military junta often framed leftist individuals and groups in order to justify its agenda to target and torture political dissidents. The junta fostered fear of leftists by staging arsenal captures and portraying leftist extremists in an extremely negative light. The regime falsely accused leftists of stealing dangerous weapons from weapons stores to justify the illegal capture of dissidents. Such fake portrayals of "the revolutionary threat" resulted in the legitimization of the Pinochet regime. The junta commissioned the Chilean public to report the actions of any suspected leftists and proceeded to turn them in. Pinochet also authorized DINA to stage the bombing of a Chilean safe house, placing the blame on leftist extremists to demonstrate the danger they posed to society. Essentially, the military junta made use of brainwashing propaganda to portray the leftists as the enemies.

Psychological torture was used to destroy a prisoner's will, dignity, morale, and physical resolve in order to extract pertinent information from the victim. Members of intelligence agencies like DINA and the Joint Command attempted to extract information from victims by threatening their children and loved ones. Many mothers who were incarcerated in illegal detention centers had to choose between saving themselves or their children's lives. On 21 August 1989, military personnel seized Jessica Antonia Liberona Niñoles and detained her in a dark, solitary room. She was stripped naked, forced to lie down on an uncomfortable prison cot, and was not permitted to sleep for five days during the interrogation period. The captors constantly threatened to kidnap her nine-year-old daughter from school if she failed to cooperate.

According to the Valech Commission, waterboarding was one of the torture methods most commonly recorded by victims of imprisonment and torture. The captors poured water over a cloth that covered the victims' faces and breathing passages, causing individuals to experience a drowning sensation and a near-death experience. Waterboarding caused detainees to asphyxiate, while their heads were submerged into the water several times in a row. Often, prisoners were hung upside-down with ropes, and they were dropped into a tank of water, headfirst. The water was contaminated and filled with debris. Waterboarding was employed to cause both physical and psychological pain; however, victims found that the mental suffering they endured was far worse than the physical pain. They attested that even 30 years after being "waterboarded", they still suffered from the devastating effects of psychological torture. Many victims reported suffering from post-traumatic stress disorder, humiliation, worthlessness, shame, anxiety, and hopelessness. The Valech Commission Report describes the testimony of a man who experienced waterboarding in September 1973:

They put cotton on both eyes, then taped them and tightened a hood around my neck. They tied my hands and legs, submerged me in a 250-liter tank that had ammonia, urine, excrement, and seawater. They submerged me until I could not breathe anymore. They repeated it over and over, while beating me and asking me questions. That is what they called the submarine.

=== Disappearances ===
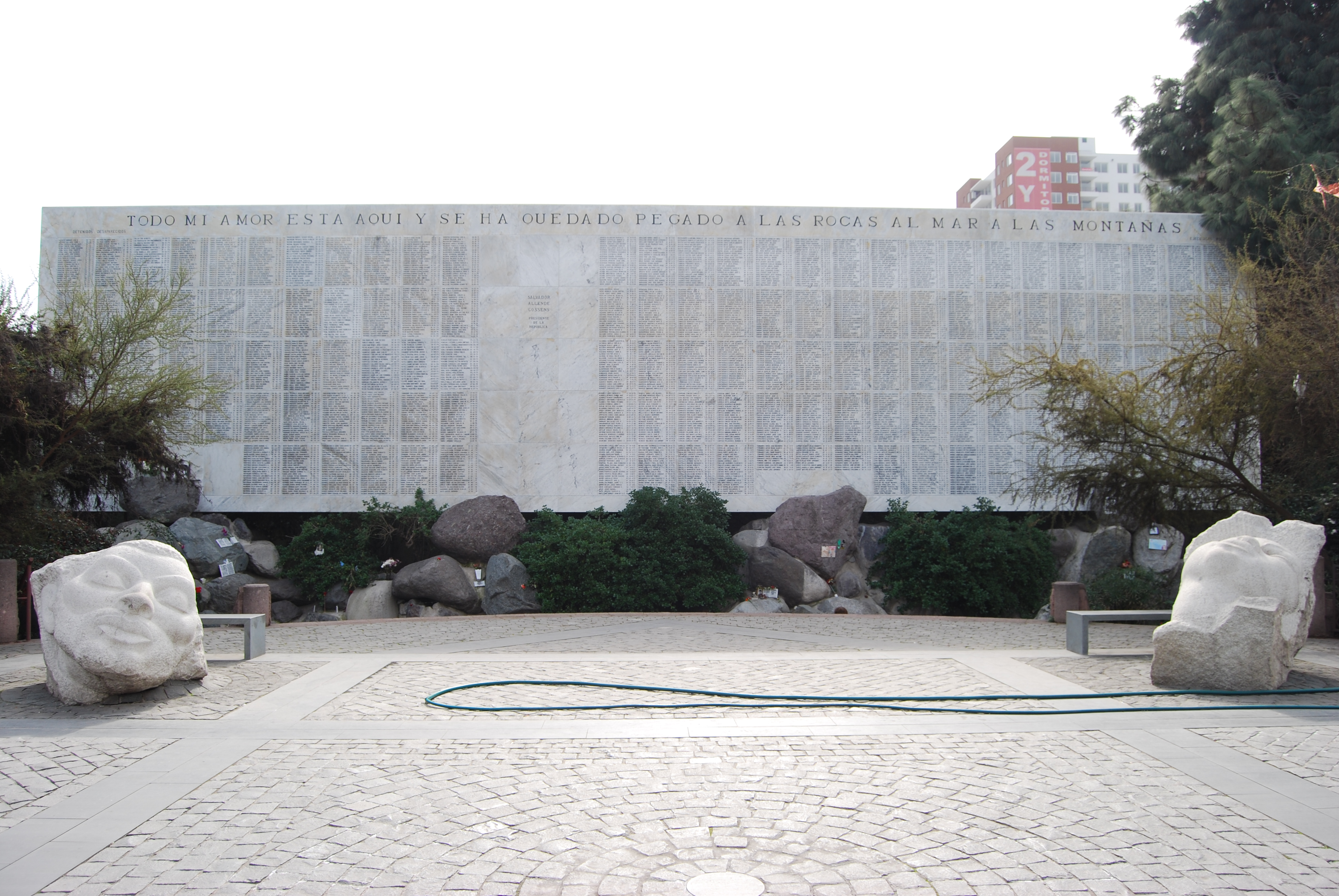
Memorial to the people that were "disappeared" during the Pinochet's regime.

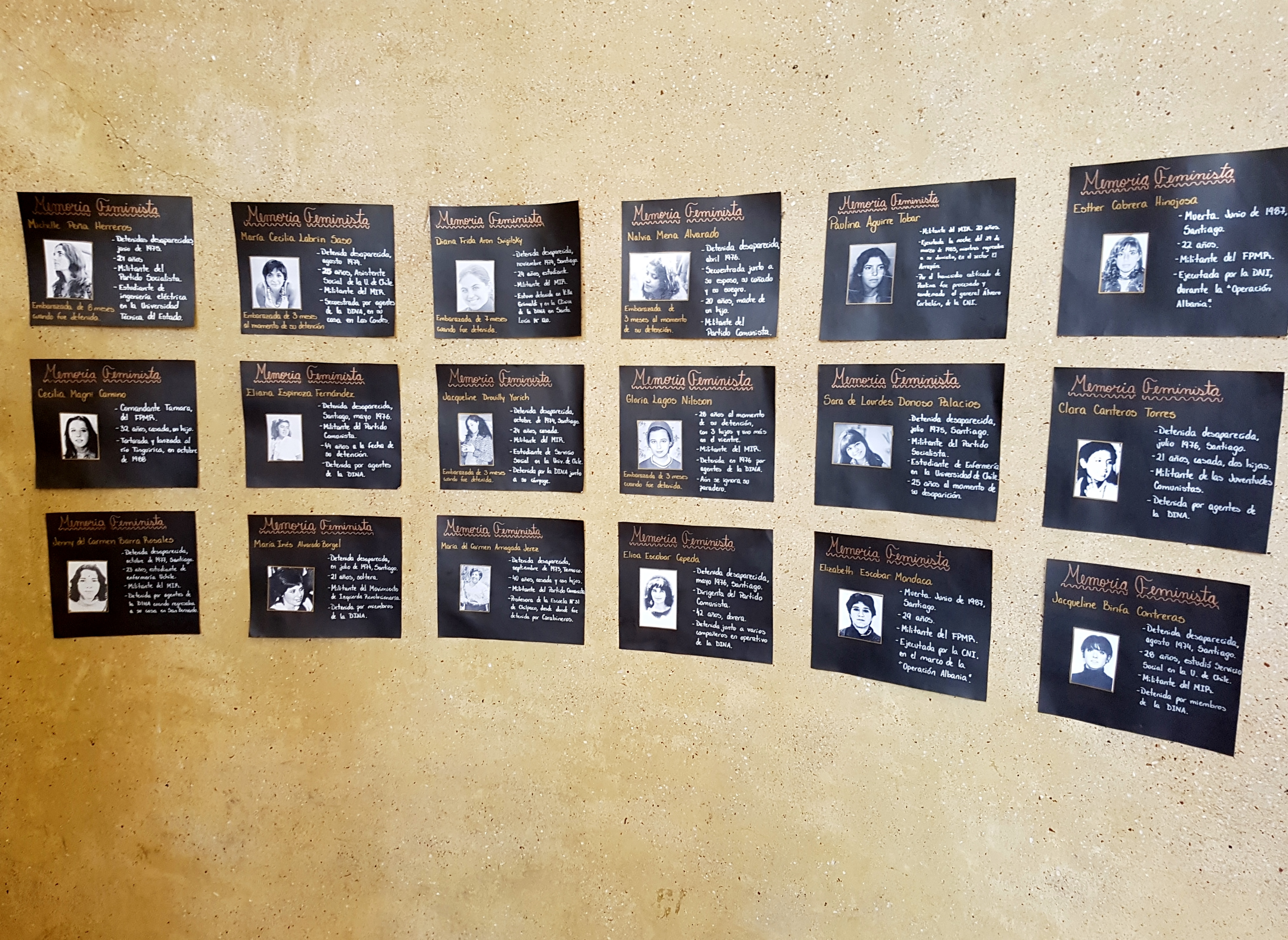
The disappeared students and professors; School of Law of the University of Chile.

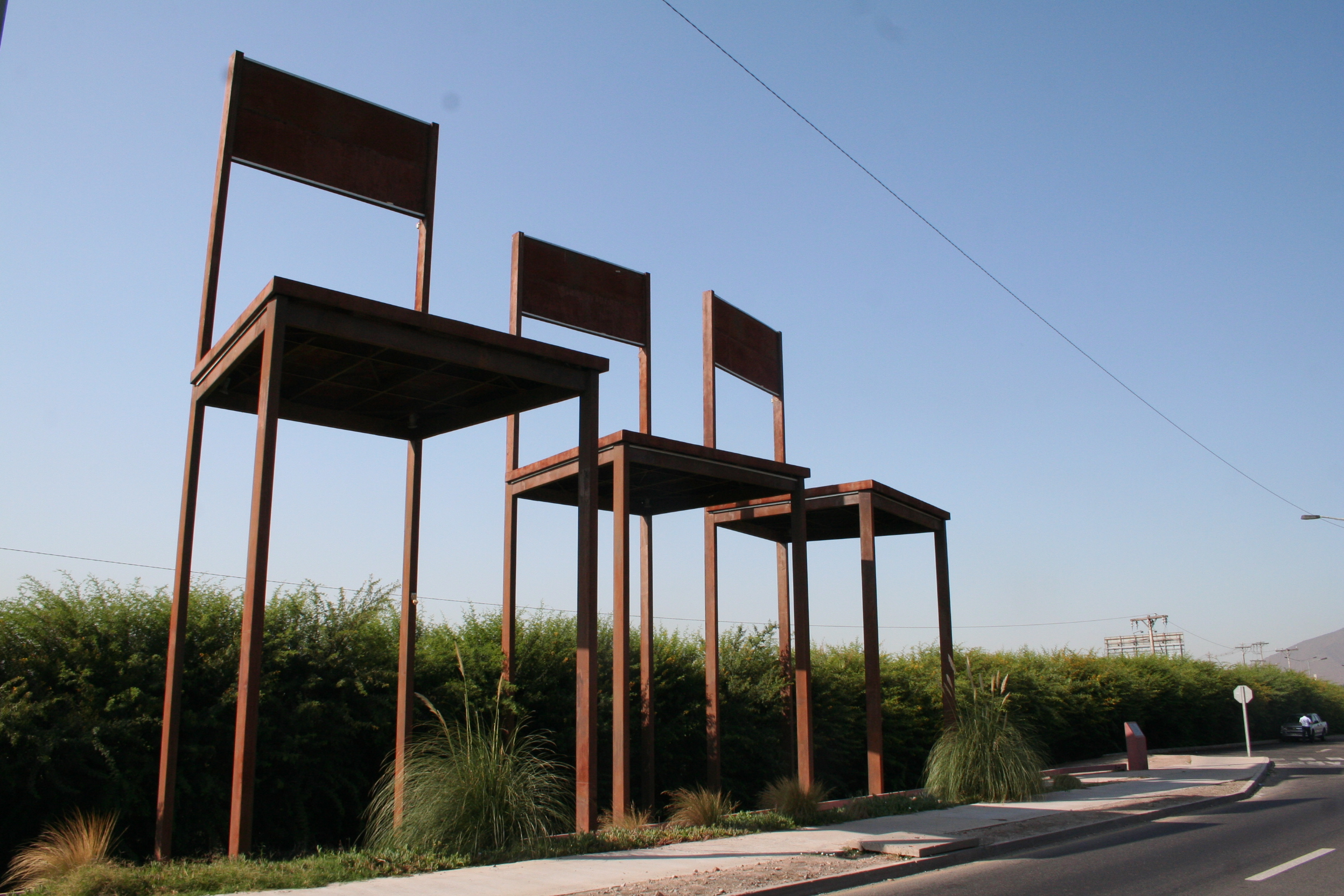
Memorial to the victims of the Caso Degollados in Chile.

While "disappearing subversives" was the central instrument of state terror administered by the Argentine military regime from the 1960s to the 1980s, it was also extremely widespread and prevalent in Chile. According to the Rettig Report, 1,248 people were "disappeared" by the Pinochet Regime. However, this number still remains a source of contention, as hundreds of bodies have yet to be discovered. Several different approximations have been made for the number of people who were "disappeared" by the military regime. Many of those who "disappeared" were not given the chance to escape or seek asylum elsewhere. Their bodies were deliberately hidden in undisclosed locations.

Only seven days after Pinochet seized power, he ordered the military to round up approximately 10,000 students, workers, and political activists and jammed them into Santiago's National Stadium on 18 September 1973. This stadium, which symbolized Chile's greatest pastime, turned into a concentration camp within a few days. Many were tortured and gunned down, and several hundred bodies were shuttled into secret mass graves. These were victims of a well-organized program of official, yet clandestine, torture and murder.

Many people were last seen in the detention and torture centers established by the intelligence agencies of the military regime. Following Pinochet's arrest in 1998, Chile made a renewed effort to uncover the atrocities of the past. For the first time in several decades, human rights lawyers and members of the armed forces wanted to investigate where the bodies of the "disappeared" were buried. On 7 January 2000, President Ricardo Lagos made a 15-minute nationwide address, revealing that the armed forces had uncovered information about the fate of approximately 180 people who had disappeared. According to Lagos, the bodies of at least 150 of these people were thrown into lakes, rivers, and the Pacific Ocean. The whereabouts of hundreds more bodies remain unknown.

== Institutionalized terrorism ==
The dictatorship under Pinochet erected a complex web of legal instruments that it used to repress anyone deemed "subversive". Pinochet was extremely tactical in his attempts to camouflage the human rights violations committed by the state. He called for a National Plebiscite in 1980 to approve the 1980 Political Constitution of the Republic of Chile—a seemingly democratic motive. Pinochet promised to cut back inflation, which was around 30-35% in 1978; he was intent on restructuring both the economic and political institutions of the region. These agendas were part of a broader scheme to garner approval from the state, making it more feasible to prosecute, imprison, and execute civilians suspected of subversion. The military and armed personnel, under Pinochet, were able to operate offensively without restrictions, as the Chilean Government had been restructured to Pinochet's liking. Even the Constitution was drafted to give Pinochet impunity. The military dictatorship utilized its own justice system to adjudicate the regime's enemies.

Additionally, the Amnesty Law decreed in 1978 by Pinochet guaranteed impunity to those responsible for the "systematic and widespread human rights violations" and was a major obstacle to bringing Pinochet to justice in Chile. Even today, "the Amnesty Law is still in force. It was recently applied by the Chilean Supreme Court in December 2007." While Pinochet was detained under house arrest on 30 October 30 2006, over "charges including murder, torture, and kidnapping" in the years following his 1973 coup, he was never formally convicted. He died before the investigation process reached a conclusion. Pinochet's Amnesty Law effectively insulated the military regime from retribution for even the most brutal and horrific human rights violations.

=== Repressive agencies ===
The National Intelligence Directorate (DINA), was the Chilean secret police during the government of Pinochet. DINA was established in November 1973 as a Chilean Army intelligence unit, with General Manuel Contreras as its head and Raúl Iturriaga as its vice-director, who fled from justice in 2007. It became an independent administrative unit in June 1974 under the auspices of decree #521.

DINA continued to exist until 1977 when it was renamed the National Information Center (CNI).

== Main violators of human rights ==
Since human rights violations during the military regime corresponded to state policy, the number of people involved in these acts as authors, accomplices, or accessories is high. While it is difficult to determine their exact number, it is estimated to exceed several hundred. Approximately 60 individuals have been convicted by Chilean courts.

- Sergio Arellano Stark
- Víctor Barría
- Patricio Carranza Saavedra
- Manuel Contreras
- Álvaro Corbalán Castilla
- Patricio Díaz Araneda
- Pedro Espinoza Bravo
- Armando Fernández Larios
- Humberto Gordon
- Carlos Herrera Jiménez
- Raúl Iturriaga Neumann
- Mario Jahn Barrera
- Miguel Krassnoff Martchenko
- Roberto Lawrence Mires
- Gustavo Leigh
- José Toribio Merino
- Marcelo Moren Brito
- Augusto Pinochet
- Alfonso Podlech
- Osvaldo Romo
- Arturo Ureta Sire
- Nelson Valdés Cornejo
- Raúl Quintana Salazar
- David Miranda Monardes
- Klaudio Kosiel Honing
- Vittorio Orvietto Tiplitzky
- Ingrid Olderock

== See also ==
- Enforced disappearances in Chile
- Patio 29
