= Basclay Zapata =

Chilean soldier (1946–2017)

Basclay Humberto Zapata Reyes (22 October 1946, in Chillán – 3 December 2017, in Santiago) was a Chilean military officer and agent of the secret police of Augusto Pinochet.

== Biography ==
He entered the army in 1965 in a regiment in the area of Chillán, where he reached the degree of corporal. In 1974 Zapata was commissioned by the Dirección de Inteligencia Nacional, DINA, where he became part of the Halcón I Group, dedicated to the repression of the Movement of the Revolutionary Left (MIR). He was under the orders of Miguel Krassnoff and worked alongside Osvaldo Romo. He was nicknamed "El Troglo" reportedly because he used to rape detainees.

During that time he married fellow agent María Teresa Osorio, alias "Marisol" and "María Soledad", who worked at Villa Grimaldi. In 1992 he was promoted to sergeant and was assigned to the DINE, also doing teaching work at the NCO School.

He was prosecuted for several cases of human rights violations . He was responsible for the death of Eulogio del Carmen Fritz Monsalve, participated in the capture of Diana Arón Svigilisky and was, together with Romo, responsible for the disappearance of Alfonso Chanfreau Oyarce.

In May 2007, he was sentenced to 10 years in prison for the kidnappings of the brothers Hernán Galo and María Elena González Inostroza and of Elsa Leuthner Muñoz and Ricardo Troncoso Muñoz, detained by the DINA in a department of calle Bueras 172, in the commune of Santiago. In June 2007, he entered the penal center of Punta Peuco, where he was held until his death. He served three years for the kidnapping of the missing Manuel Cortez Joo, and twenty years for several other disappearances.

== Last years and death ==
In 2016, Zapata wrote letters to the families of some of his victims, asking for forgiveness. He died of cancer on 3 December 2017 in Punta Peuco prison.
