= Ingrid Olderöck =

Major of the Carabineros and former agent of the DINA

Íngrid Olderöck
- Born: 14 September 1943; Santiago, Chile
- Died: 17 March 2001 (57 years)

Íngrid Felicitas Olderöck Benhard (14 September 1943 – 17 March 2001), better known as "Woman of the Dogs", was a Carabineros de Chile major who was converted into an agent of the Dirección de Inteligencia Nacional (DINA, the Chilean Secret Police) in 1973. She was responsible for human rights violations during the first years of the military dictatorship in Chile.

== Early life ==
Olderöck was a descendant of Nazi-affiliated Germans - her father hailed from Hamburg and her mother from Munich. According to Nancy Guzmán, a journalist and author of the book Ingrid Olderöck: The Woman of the Dogs, the future agent was raised in a very authoritarian family environment where there was a certain contempt for Latin American culture, which was considered less prone to order. Her parents had their children learn to use musical instruments, dance, or write, and they had to speak German exclusively.

She stated during an interview with Guzmán:

Yo soy nazi desde pequeña, desde que aprendí que el mejor período que vivió Alemania fue cuando estuvieron los nazis en el poder, cuando había trabajo y tranquilidad y no había ladrones sinvergüenzas.
I have been a Nazi since I was a child, since I learned that the best period Germany experienced was when the Nazis were in power, when there was work and peace, and there were no shameless thieves.

— Ingrid Olderock: La mujer de los perros

== Human rights violations ==
In October 1973, Olderöck joined DINA with the rank of captain and participated in the Women's School of the institution, where approximately 70 women were trained in the methods of torture as well as repressive tactics against opponents of the military dictatorship. According to sources, during her tenure at the DINA, she became privy to secrets related to Project Andrea, which was led by the Pinochet military dictatorship to manufacture and apply sarin against opponents.

In 1974, the DINA established the first of its first clandestine detention and torture centers, among which was Venda Sexy, where there were allegations that Olderöck would commit torture and rape using a German Shepherd dog named "Volodia".

When her parents died, she took it upon herself to have her sister tortured and raped in order to seize the inheritance.

== Attempted assassination ==
On July 15, 1981, Olderöck was attacked in her home. She was shot in the head by a commando from the Revolutionary Left Movement (MIR). Following this incident, she retired from the Carabineros. Olderöck maintained that, although the attack was carried out by the MIR, it had been planned by Carabineros in retaliation for her desertion. According to Nancy Guzmán, Olderöck "always insisted that the deceased General César Mendoza gave the order for her assassination and that it was Major Julio Benimelli who carried it out".

== Death ==
Olderöck died on March 17, 2001, at the age of 57 due to an acute digestive hemorrhage. Her human rights violations remained unpunished. While alive, she exhibited signs of madness caused by the projectile lodged in her head after the attack.

== Cultural reference ==
The story of Olderöck served as inspiration for the animated short film Bestia, directed by Hugo Covarrubias and released in 2021. The movie was nominated for an Oscar in the Best Animated Short Film category.

== Sources ==
- Guzmán, Nancy (2014). Ingrid Olderock : la mujer de los perros (in Spanish) (1 ed.). Santiago de Chile: Ceibo Ediciones. ISBN 978-956-9071-89-8.
