= Venda Sexy =

Former torture center in Santiago, Chile

- Prison camp used during the Military dictatorship of Chile
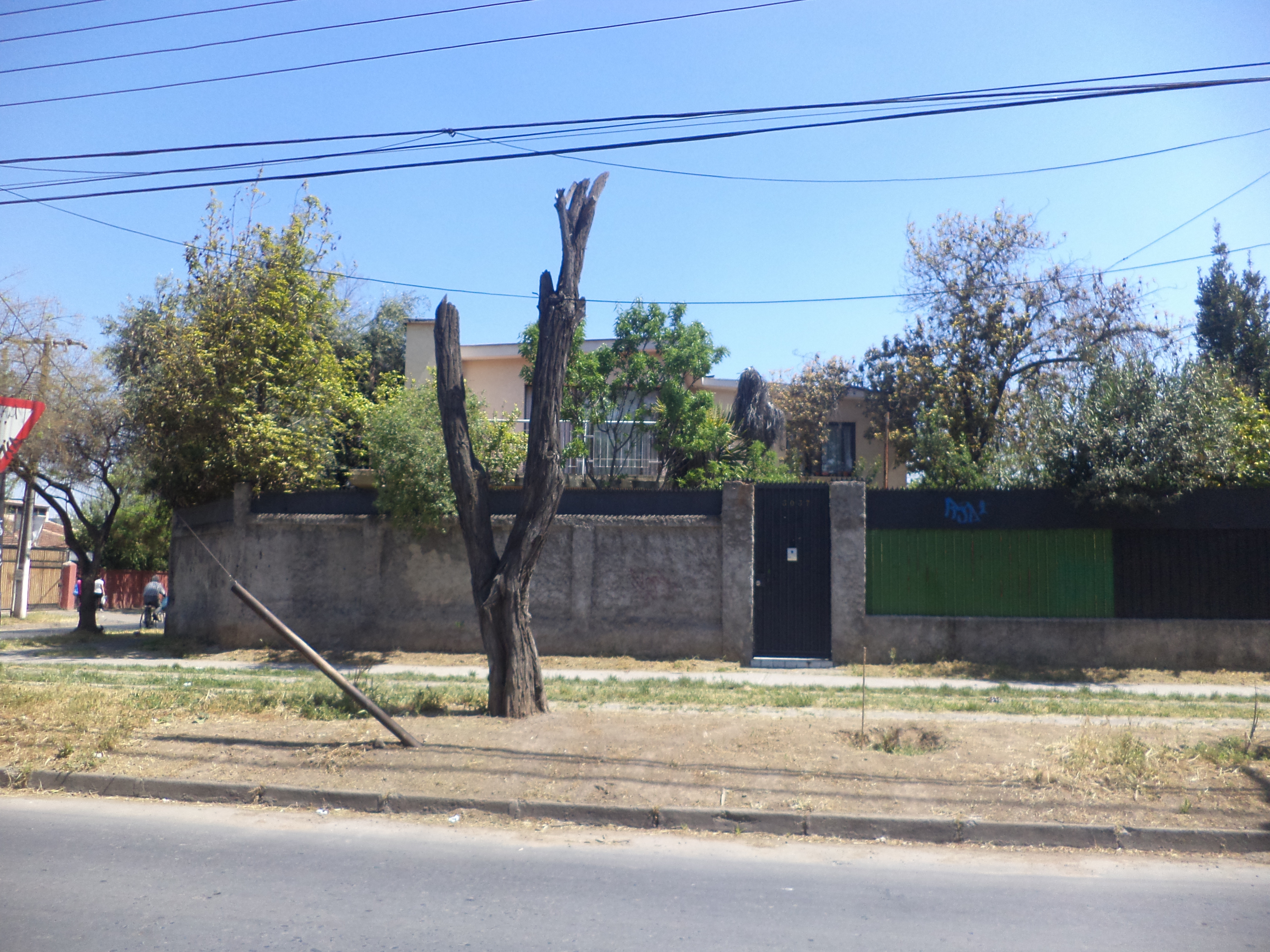
- View of the former Venda Sexy

- Location within Chile
- Coordinates: 33°26′56″S 70°40′9″W
- Other names: Venda Sexy or Discothèque (3037 Iran Street)
- Known for: Internment of Pinochet's dissidents during his military dictatorship
- Location: Santiago
- Operated by: DINA (when the estate acted as a prison)
- Operational: 1973-1975
- Inmates: Pinochet's dissidents
- Killed: 23

The Venda Sexy is an estate near Santiago, Chile that was used as a torture center by the DINA secret police during the military dictatorship of Augusto Pinochet known for the systematic use of sexual violence against political activists, particularly women, detained there.

== Description of the estate ==
The house had two floors and a basement, and it was surrounded by a garden. The floors were in parquetry and the stairs in marble.

Initially the property of a communist family, in 1974 they fled political repression and the estate became owned by a corporation owned by Carabineros de Chile officer and DINA agent Miguel Eugenio Hernández Oyarzo, who initially used it as dormitory for DINA agents. In 1981, it was sold and the first would-be buyer, neighbours, who initially planned to lodge students and a nursery, refused after learning how the estate was used; another buyer acquired the property.

== Under Pinochet ==
On September 11, 1973, a military junta in Chile staged a violent coup against the democratically elected government, with the support of the Nixon administration. Socialist President Salvador Allende committed suicide under mysterious circumstances. Particularly during the first years of the junta's 17-year rule, it ruthlessly persecuted its perceived opponents — trade unionists and members of liberal, socialist, and communist organizations. Torture was a daily occurrence. To this end, the junta established more than 1,200 secret prisons and torture sites in the years that followed. In addition to public facilities, the junta utilized military and police premises, it also seized and expropriated private property.

The torture center was called Venda Sexy ("Sexy Blindfold") for the sexual abuse that the inmates suffered during the detention and the fact inmates were blindfolded at all times. A name allegedly coined by perpetrators. Another name that was given to the estate was La Discothéque for the music that was played when the inmates were tortured.

According to the Valech Report, the tortures used there had a sexual character. Such tortures included rapes by wardens and nude photos; Ingrid Olderock, a Carabineros de Chile major who was converted into an agent of the Dirección de Inteligencia Nacional (DINA, the Chilean Secret Police) nicknamed the "women of the dogs", had a German shepherd dog named Volodia (named from Volodia Teitelboim) trained to rape female inmates. Inmates had to stay naked.

In 1974, numerous members of the leftist guerrilla group Revolutionary Left Movement were interned in the camp; from 1974 to 1981, 80 inmates, one third of them female, were held in this facility; the highest activity was in 1974.

The head of secret police DINA was Manuel Contreras, who was trained in a military intelligence unit at Fort Benning, Georgia in the United States. Contreras had relationships with the CIA and received money. His office was in downtown Santiago and he regularly visited the different detention and concentration camps: Villa Grimaldi (Terranova Barracks), 38 London Street (Yucatan Barracks), 1367 José Domingo Cañas Street (Ollagüe Barracks), Venda Sexy or Discothèque (3037 Iran Street), 8630 Simón Bolívar Avenue and others. In Chile there were approximately 1200 secret prisons and torture centers, more than 220 of them in Santiago alone. Contreras was daily informed by his subordinate officers. Later Contreras was convicted and at the time of his death, he was serving 59 unappealable sentences totaling 529 years in prison.

== Memorial ==
In 2016, several former inmates in associations such as the Colectivo de Mujeres Sobrevivientes Siempre Resistentes ("Collective of surviving women always resisting") and the Sobrevivientes de Venda Sexy ("Survivors of Venda Sexy") asked the former facility to be made a national monument. However, it's owned by private parties who are banned from altering it, and these collectives asked the state buy it to make a memorial center.

Only around 2018, both the Chilean and German governments began to assume responsibility and to take initial steps toward coming to terms with the past. The secret detention camp "Colonia Dignidad", established in post-World War II Chile by German emigrants, had been one of the torture centers during the Pinochet era.

== Fiction ==
- Bestia, an Academy Award-nominated animated short film centered on Olderock.

== See also ==
- Ingrid Olderock
