= Londres 38 =

Former political prison in Chile

- Prison camp used during the military dictatorship of Chile
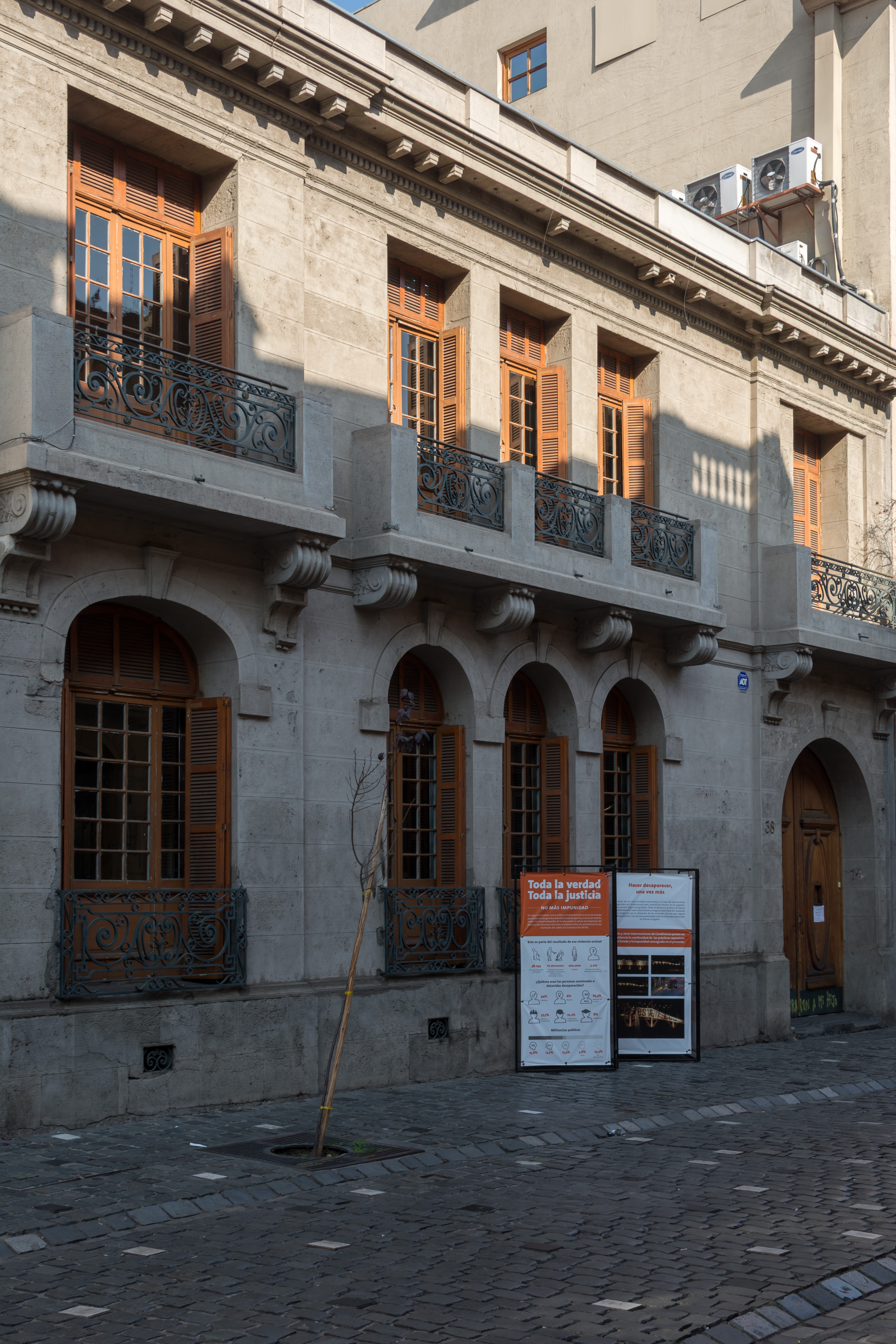
- Londres 38 façade

- Location of Londres 38 in contemporary Chile
- Coordinates: 33°26′39.5″S 70°38′53.1″W
- Other names: Cuartel Yucatán
- Known for: Internment of Pinochet's dissidents during his military dictatorship
- Location: Santiago
- Operated by: DINA (1974-77), CNI (1977-78)
- Operational: 1974-78
- Inmates: Pinochet's dissidents
- Website: https://www.londres38.cl/

Londres 38 is a building that was used by the National Intelligence Directorate (DINA) as a detention and torture center for opponents of Augusto Pinochet's dictatorship. The facility is located in downtown Santiago, Chile, and was known in DINA's jargon by the code name Yucatán.

== History ==
=== Yucatán Barracks ===
This place served as the former communal headquarters of the Socialist Party of Chile (PS). However, following the coup d'état on September 11, 1973, and continuing until the end of 1974, it underwent a transformation into a clandestine detention and torture center under the control of the DINA. In this initial phase of repression, the methods of torture, forced disappearances, and extermination employed at this location were shockingly brutal.

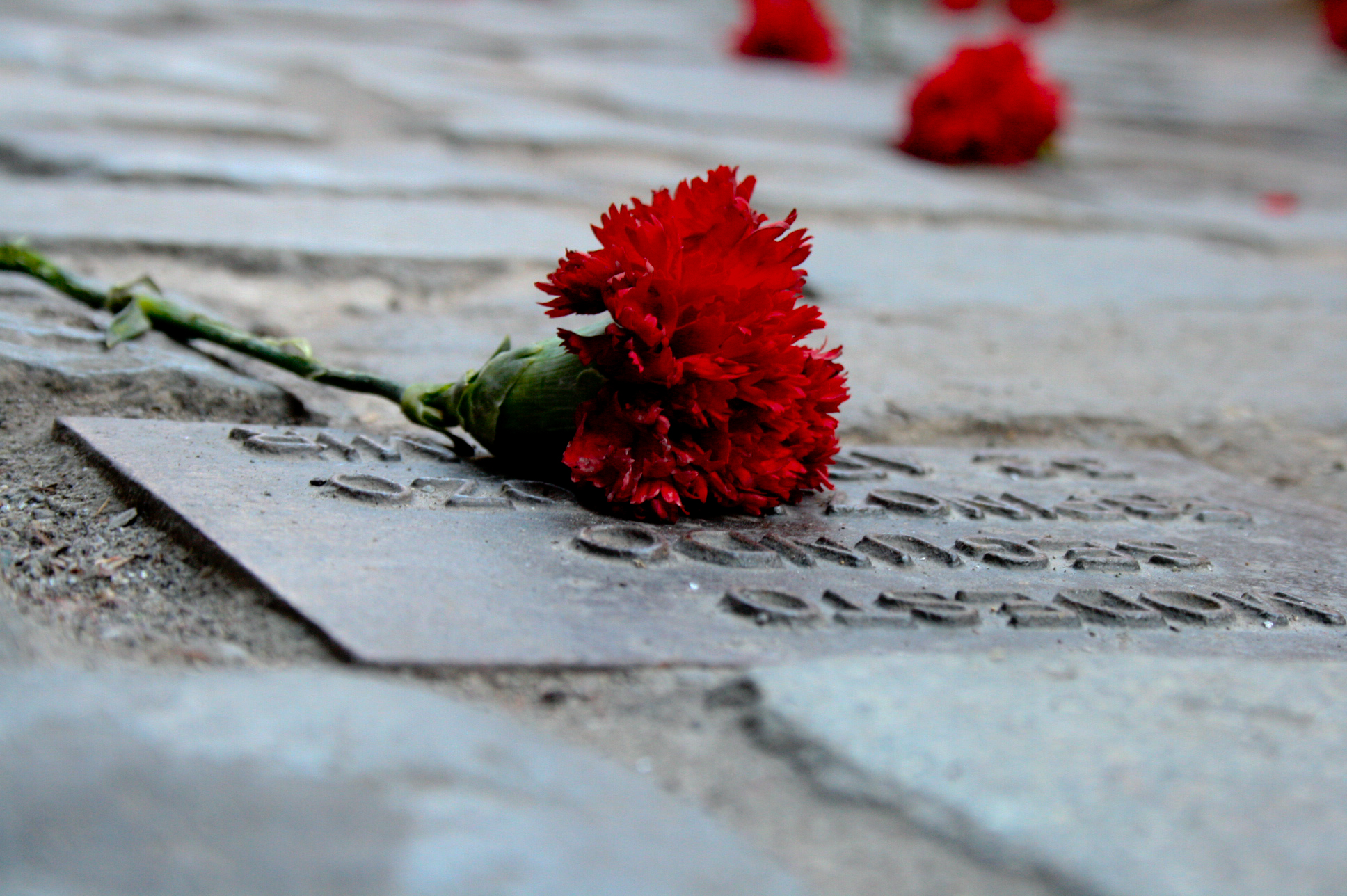
A tribute to Modesto Segundo Espinoza at Londres 38.

The significance of this site lies in it being the first link in a chain of detention facilities used by the DINA in the Metropolitan Region. This chain was employed in a campaign against the Revolutionary Left Movement (MIR) initially, and later, against other left-wing organizations in Chile, including the Socialist and Communist (PC) parties. This campaign also encompassed clandestine facilities situated at José Domingo Cañas No. 1367, Venda Sexy, and Villa Grimaldi.

In fact, during the period from May 20, 1974, to February 20, 1975, more than 219 prisoners, the majority of whom were MIR militants, were subjected to forced disappearances and/or executions in these four clandestine facilities. Never before, nor afterward, during the seventeen-year span of the military dictatorship, were such a significant number of individuals subjected to forced disappearances and/or executions in the Metropolitan Region during a single repressive campaign. This fact becomes evident when comparing these figures with those of the campaigns targeting the entire left-wing movement from September 11 to October 30, 1973, and the one directed against the Communist Party from late 1975 to late 1976.

According to the Rettig Commission, in this place, the DINA committed:

"the most characteristic forms of treatment by the DINA during its initial phase, many of which continued later: immediate and unlimited interrogations and torture, permanent degrading treatment."

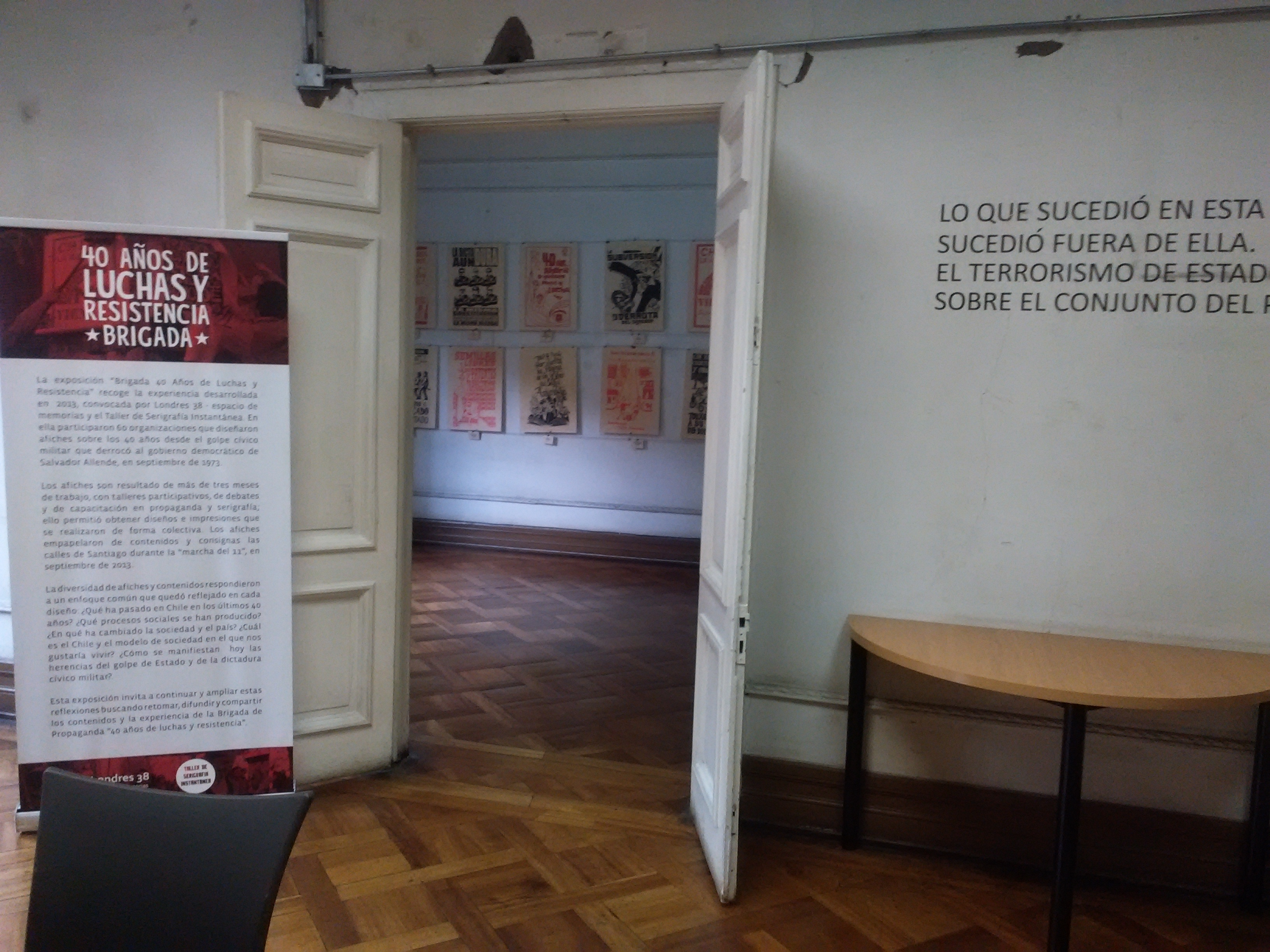
The Londres 38 property operating as a museum.

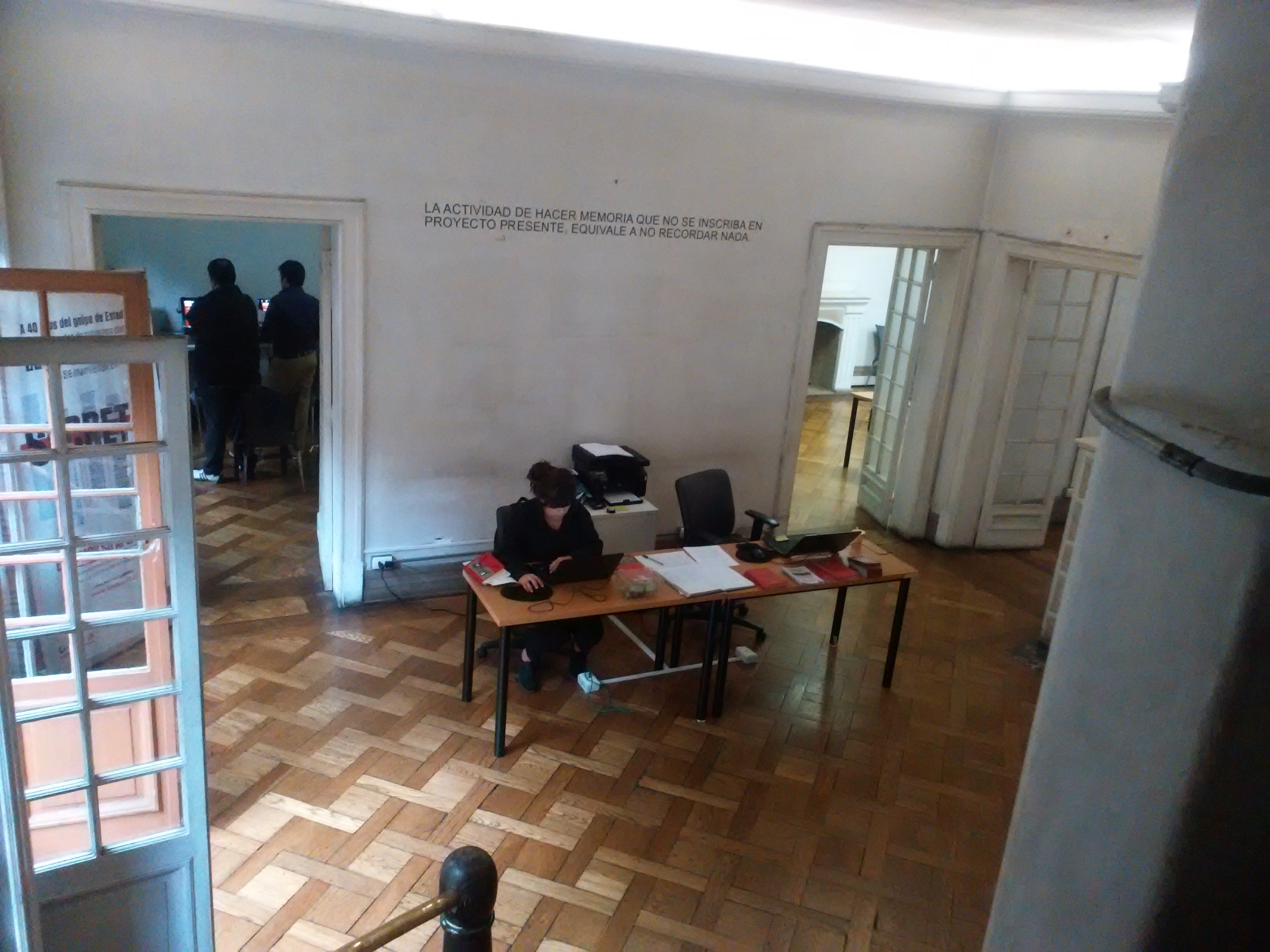
Londres 38's reception room.

A significant number of individuals were held captive within these premises. By the end of 1974, when the facilities at José Domingo Cañas and Villa Grimaldi became operational, this site was shut down, and its prisoners were dispersed among other secretive detention centers. It is estimated that approximately 1,100 people passed through this establishment, and within its confines, 81 men and 13 women were executed, including two pregnant women. The majority of these individuals were young; 80 of them had not yet reached 30 years of age, with 38 being under 25 years old and 12 being minors under 20 years of age. Regarding their political affiliations, 64 were affiliated with the MIR, 17 with the PC, 7 with the PS, and 6 had no recognized political affiliation. Out of these 94 detainees who were either disappeared or executed at Londres 38, 47 are included in the list of the 119 individuals associated with Operation Colombo.

The detainees referred to this location as the "Palace of Laughter" or the "House of Bells" because they could hear the nearby San Francisco Church's bells from within, though they were unable to determine which church it was due to their circumstances. They also dubbed it La Silla ("The Chair"):

"due to how the prisoners were kept: blindfolded, hands and feet bound, seated in a chair day and night."

According to testimonies provided to the Valech Commission, in this location, the detainees:

"endured brutal torture within these premises. They were typically blindfolded, often bound to chairs, stripped of their clothing, and received little to no sustenance. Only exceptionally were they given water. They reported enduring interrogations throughout their stay. During these interrogations, the prisoners were subjected to beatings, sometimes resulting in fractures, the pau de arara technique (which involves contorted positions on a bar), both dry and wet forms of the submarine (simulated drowning), electric shocks applied on la parrilla, hanging, cigarette burns, el teléfono (slapping both ears with open hands), and even forced to play Russian roulette. They were administered drugs, exposed to disruptive noises at night to prevent sleep, particularly blaring music. They were coerced into listening to and witnessing the torture of other detainees, subjected to humiliation, sexual abuse, mock executions, threats, and psychological manipulation."

Subsequently, on November 29, 1978, the building was transferred at no cost to the O'Higginian Institute through Supreme Decree 964, signed by Augusto Pinochet. It was during this period that the number 38 was changed to 40.

This Institute is an organization affiliated with the Chilean Army and was chaired for decades by retired General Washington Carrasco, who played an active role in the repressive actions carried out immediately after the 1973 coup in the Biobío Region. In mid-2006, Carrasco was succeeded by Carlos Aguirre.

=== House of memory ===
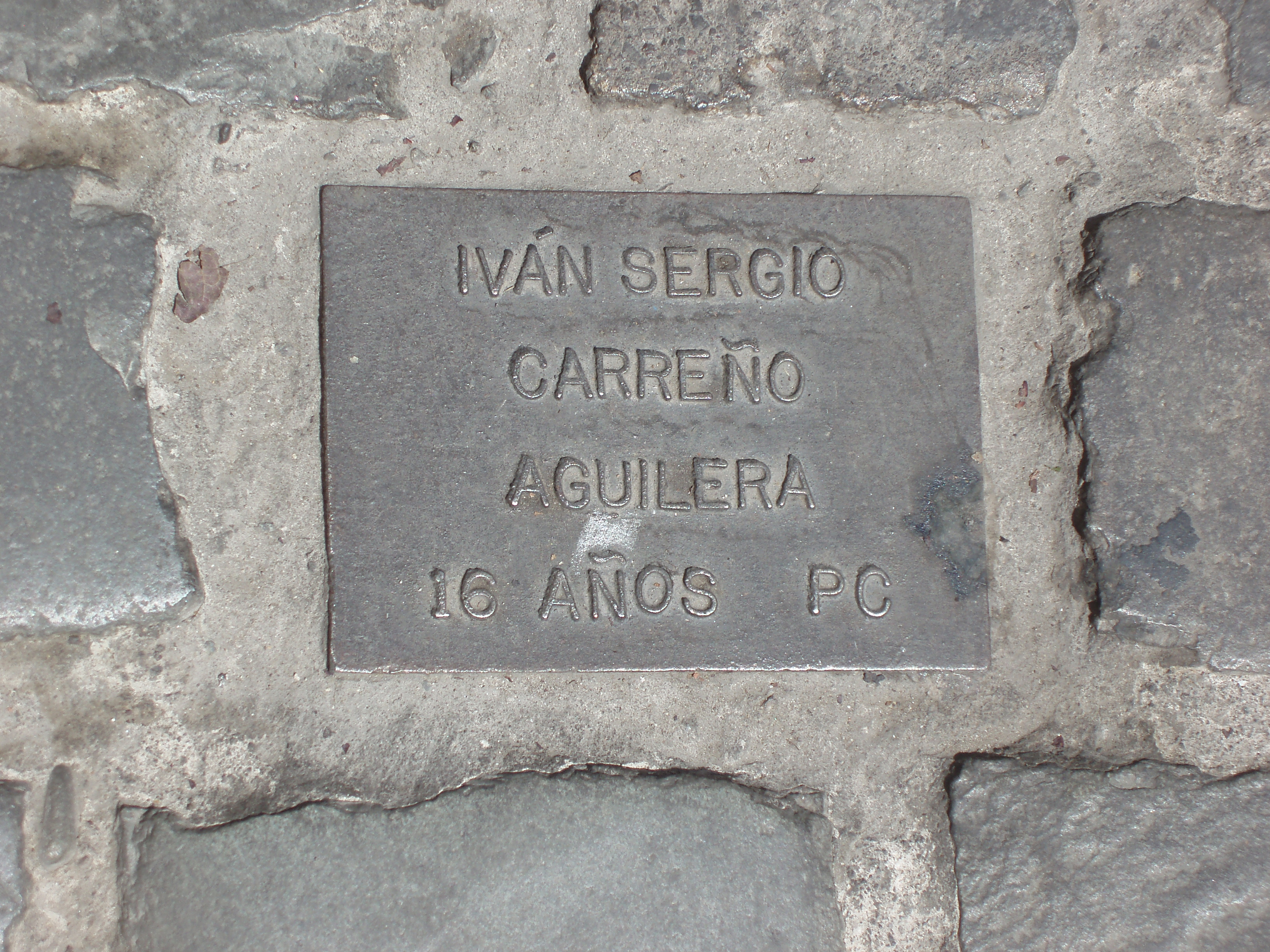
Today, tablets on the cobblestones commemorate the victims of Londres 38.

On October 12, 2005, this site was designated a Historical Monument of Chile, following a request by the "Colectivo Londres 38." In February 2006, the O'Higginian Institute put the property up for sale through a public auction, but this attempt could not be realized due to the active opposition of human rights organizations and the complexities involved in selling such a Historical Monument. In August 2008, the Ministry of National Assets exchanged the property, transferring it into the hands of the State.

Today, in remembrance of those who were detained and lost their lives at Londres 38, the house is open to the public, offering guided discussions to educate people about all that transpired within its walls.

== Bibliography ==
- Ministry of Interior (2005). Report of the National Commission on Political Imprisonment and Torture. Santiago. ISBN 956-7808-47-3.
- National Commission for Truth and Reconciliation (1999). Report of the National Commission for Truth and Reconciliation. Santiago: Reissue by the National Corporation for Reparation and Reconciliation.
