= Diana Arón =

Chilean journalist (1950–1975)

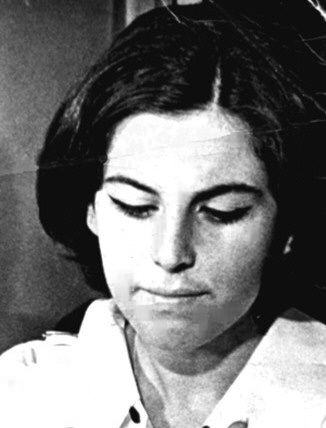
- Born: Diana Frida Arón Svigilisky; 15 February 1950; Santiago, Chile
- Disappeared: 18 November 1974; Villa Grimaldi, Santiago, Chile
- Died: 10 January 1975; Villa Grimaldi, Santiago, Chile
- Occupations: Journalist; Political activist
- Partner: Luis Muñoz González

Diana Frida Arón Svigilisky (15 February 1950 – 10 January 1975) was a Chilean journalist and a member of the Revolutionary Left Movement (Movimiento de Izquierda Revolucionaria, MIR). She was kidnapped, tortured and forcibly disappeared by agents of the Pinochet dictatorship.

== Biography ==
She studied at the Hebrew Institute and then journalism at the Catholic University, developed her professional practice on Canal 13, belonging to the same university. After graduating, she worked as a reporter for Onda magazine of Editorial Quimantú. Arón was a member of the Revolutionary Left Movement and part of the editorial team of its newspaper, El Rebelde ("The Rebel").

== Disappearance ==
After the 1973 military coup and subsequent military dictatorship, Arón was forced to go underground. On 18 November 1974, she was arrested by agents of the then-active secret police of Chile, the Dirección de Inteligencia Nacional (DINA), and taken to Villa Grimaldi, where she was tortured by Miguel Krassnoff, who was seen leaving the torture room with bloody hands, screaming "a Marxist, and on top of that, a Jew!". After that, she was forcibly disappeared and her body was never found. According to her partner, Luis Muñoz González, who had also been captured and tortured, a Captain of the army informed him that Arón had been killed on 10 January 1975, after trying to escape. Multiple investigations were carried out to find her body, none of which were successful.

Two legal processes were initiated in the 1970s, both ultimately ending in acquittal. In 2004, five members of the DINA –Manuel Contreras, Miguel Krassnoff, Osvaldo Romo, Pedro Espinoza and Marcelo Moren– were sentenced in terms ranging from 10 to 15 years to be served out at the Punta Peuco Prison for their involvement in her kidnapping.

== See also ==
- List of kidnappings
- List of people who disappeared mysteriously: 1910–1990
