= Bestia (2021 film) =

- Directed by: Hugo Covarrubias
- Screenplay by: Hugo Covarrubias; Martín Erazo
- Produced by: Tevo Díaz
- Cinematography: Hugo Covarrubias
- Music by: Ángela Acuña; Camilo Salinas
- Production companies: Maleza Studio; Trébol 3
- Release date: June 14, 2021 (Annecy)
- Running time: 15 minutes
- Country: Chile
- Language: Spanish

Bestia (Spanish: Bestia) is a 2021 Chilean stop-motion animated short film directed by Hugo Covarrubias and co-written with Martín Erazo. The film won Best Animated Short Subject at the 49th Annie Awards. It also made the shortlist for Best Animated Short Film at the 94th Academy Awards, later achieving the nomination, becoming the second Chilean animated short film to be nominated for an Oscar after Bear Story in 2016, which won the award.

== Synopsis ==
The main character is inspired by Íngrid Olderöck, a police major and DINA agent during the Chilean military dictatorship, responsible for human rights violations in that period. According to Covarrubias, the objective of the film is not a biography of Olderöck but:

A visit to her secret life, her relationship with her dog, her fears and frustrations, which are ultimately the x-ray of a country that is fractured, a country that it is full of wounds that are not even close to healing yet.

— Covarrubias on the film's topic, Solomonos

== Release ==
The film screened at the 2021 Annecy International Animation Film Festival, where it competed in the Short Films section and won the Festival Connexion Award.

== Production ==
Bestia is the third animated short film directed by Hugo Covarrubias, after El almohadón de pluma (2007) and La noche boca arriba (2012). The idea arose with the intention of addressing part of the history of Chile "with lesser-known characters, less official and darker". Although the original objective was to produce an animated series, Covarrubias decided to focus on one of those stories to make a unitary short film.

The technique used was stop motion animation, which was done by Covarrubias and Matías Delgado. The design of the protagonist was based on the aesthetics of porcelain dolls, to convey the inexpressiveness and coldness of the character. The character was created with polyurethane resin bathed in crystal resin, to give her face a texture similar to ceramic. Meanwhile, the sets and decorations were made with different opaque cardboards to create a contrast with the brightness of the resin.

The short film was produced by Tevo Díaz, through the company Trébol 3, while Cecilia Toro worked as a costume designer and art producer. Its financing came from the "Audiovisual Development Fund" of the Ministry of Cultures, Arts, and Heritage of Chile.

== Accolades ==
Year	Ceremony	Award/Category	Status
2018	ANIMA LATINA: Festival de Cine de Animación Latinoamericano	Best Latin American Short Film	Won
2021	ANIMA - Córdoba International Animation Festival	Best Latin American Short Film - Best Animation	Won
2021	ANIMA - Córdoba International Animation Festival	Best Animated Short Film - Gran Jury Prize	Won
2021	ANIMARIO - International Contemporary Animation Festival of Madrid	Best Shortfilm	Won
2021	Annecy International Animated Film Festival	Festivals Connexion Award	Won
2021	Annecy International Animated Film Festival	Annecy Crystal (Best Short Film)	Nominated
2021	ANTOFACINE International Film Festival	Best International Shortfilm	Won
2021	ANTOFACINE International Film Festival	Best Shortfilm Young Jury	Won
2021	BITBANG Fest	First Jury Mention	Won
2021	Berlin Interfilm Festival	Best Animation - International Competition	Won
2021	Berlin Interfilm Festival	Confrontations Online Award- 2nd Prize	Won
2021	Bucheon International Animation Film Festival	Best International Short Film	Won
2021	Chilemonos International Animation Film Festival	Best Latin American Short Film	Won
2021	Clermont-Ferrand International Short Film Festival	Best Animation - International Competition	Won
2021	Clermont-Ferrand International Short Film Festival	Grand Prix - International Competition	Nominated
2021	Fam de Todos	Best Short Film	Won
2021	Viña del Mar International Film Festival	Best Short Film	Won
2021	Guadalajara International Film Festival	Best Animated Short Film	Won
2021	Imaginaria Film Festival	Best Animated Short Film	Won
2021	Ottawa International Animation Festival	Independent Short Animation	Nominated
2021	StopTrik International Film Festival	Audience Grand Prix	Won
2021	StopTrik International Film Festival	Best Shortfilm LODZ edition.	Won
2021	StopTrik International Film Festival	Special Mention Yiorgos Tsangaris	Won
2021	StopTrik International Film Festival	Students Special Mention	Won
2021	Tallinn Black Nights Film Festival	Best Animation Short	Won
2021	Vila do Conde International Short Film Festival	Great Prize Cidade Vila do Conde	Nominated
2022	Annie Awards	Best Animated Short Subject	Won
2022	Academy Awards	Best Animated Short Film	Nominated
2022	Quirino Awards	Best Animated Short Film	Won
2022	Quirino Awards	Best Visual Development (Hugo Covarrubias, Constanza Wette, Pablo Castillo, Cecilia Toro)	Won
2022	Quirino Awards	Best Animation Design (Hugo Covarrubias, Matias Delgado)	Nominated
2022	Quirino Awards	Best Sound Design and Original Music (Roberto Espinoza, Roberto Zúñiga, Ángela Acuña, Camilo Salinas)	Nominated

== See also ==
- Independent animation
- Arthouse animation
- Cinema of Chile
