= Sergio Valech =

Sergio Valech Aldunate (Note: In this Chilean name, the first or paternal surname is Valech and the second or maternal family name is Aldunate.) (21 October 1927 – 24 November 2010) was the Roman Catholic Auxiliary Bishop Emeritus of the Roman Catholic Archdiocese of Santiago de Chile, Chile. He was the head of the eight-member National Commission on Political Imprisonment and Torture panel in Chile, which investigated instances of torture that occurred under the military regime of Augusto Pinochet. After a six-month investigation, and another six months of preparation, the panel released the Valech Report in November 2004.

Valech was born in Santiago, Chile, to a family of rich Syrian immigrants. He was ordained priest of Santiago de Chile on 28 June 1953. On 27 August 1973, he was appointed Auxiliary Bishop of Santiago de Chile and Titular Bishop of Zabi. On 18 October 1973 he was ordained Titular Bishop of Zabi. He retired as Auxiliary Bishop of Santiago de Chile on 3 March 2003.

Valech died of lung cancer on 24 November 2010.
