= Project Andrea =

Pinochet's plan to manufacture sarin gas

- Proyecto Andrea
- Part of the Chilean Army
- Chile
- DINA logo

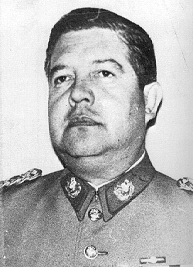
- Manuel Contreras, director of the DINA

Site information
- Type: Intelligence service; Repressive police

Location
- Coordinates: 33.44063°S 70.63546°W

Project Andrea (Spanish: Proyecto Andrea) is the code name of an effort by the military dictatorship of Augusto Pinochet to manufacture sarin gas (Note: Sarin is a man-made chemical weapon classified as a nerve agent. Nerve agents are the most toxic and fast-acting chemical warfare agents known. They are similar to organophosphorus pesticides (insecticides) because of the way they act and the harmful effects they produce. However, they are much more potent. Sarin was originally developed as a pesticide in 1938 in Germany. It is a clear, colorless, and tasteless liquid that has no odor in its pure form. However, it can become vaporized and spread to the environment. Sarin is also known as "GB".) for use as a weapon against its opponents.

== The Lo Curro house ==
At the beginning of the period of the Military Regime, an electronic and chemical warfare laboratory was installed in the house of Michael Townley and Mariana Callejas in Lo Curro, located at Via Naranja 4925, Vitacura, Chile. The government of Augusto Pinochet had given them that house – three floors, almost 1,000 square meters of building and 5,000 of land – located in the upper part of Santiago, in return for services rendered to the Dirección de Inteligencia Nacional (DINA).

A voluminous concrete cube, rather ugly, with something of an orphanage, hospital, or other public building.

— Carlos Iturra, Caída en desgracia

Legally it was not theirs, as it had been acquired by then Army Major Raúl Iturriaga and a DINA lawyer who died in strange circumstances in 1976 under a false identity.

The idea was for it to serve as housing for the married agents and their children, but mainly – because it was not an unconditional gift – for the barracks to operate there, from which subsequent terrorist operations abroad would be prepared. In the DINA this barracks house was called Quetropillán. It had two permanent agents, who served as drivers and assistants, and a secretary, who kept the accounts and assisted the homeowner in administrative tasks. In addition, the team included a gardener, a cook, and two chemists: Francisco Oyarzún and Eugenio Berríos, alias Hermes. The latter two spent the day locked in a laboratory, experimenting with the lethality of sarin gas on mice and rabbits.

== Victims ==
The sarin gas was first manufactured by the DINA in Santiago, and then began to be made in Colonia Dignidad, with its logistical support. It was exported and used to assassinate opponents of the regime both in Chile and abroad. The victims presented the symptoms of a heart attack.

=== First tests ===
Sarin manufactured in Chile was used for the first time by Michael Townley against two Peruvian citizens. Townley revealed to Judge Alejandro Madrid that in Chile not only real estate conservator Renato León Zenteno (1976) and Army corporal and DINA agent Manuel Leyton (1977) were murdered with sarin, but also other people whose deaths were made to appear as suicides or strange deaths. Some of these people, according to Townley, were involved in the storage and transport of containers of sarin in the 1970s and early 1980s. One of them would be a doctor or assistant who participated in the autopsies of Renato Zenteno and Corporal Leyton.

=== Carlos Osorio ===
Townley told the judge that the Protocol Director of the Chilean Ministry of Foreign Affairs, Carlos Guillermo Osorio, had not committed suicide – as was officially announced in October 1977 – but had been killed. Osorio was in charge of granting passports with false identities so that Army officers – among them, Armando Fernández Larios – could travel to the United States to prepare the attack against Orlando Letelier and two others (Rolando Mosqueira and René Riveros), to try to mislead American intelligence about the authorship of the attack and cover for the DINA. The sources maintain that Townley affirmed that Osorio was another victim of sarin, even though he had been shot once in the head.

=== Carmelo Soria ===
Eugenio Berríos played a role in the death of Carmelo Soria, a CEPAL official who was kidnapped by a DINA operative in July 1976 and taken to Townley's house in Lo Curro. There, in the Berríos laboratory, Soria was administered sarin gas, according to the investigation, and was then tortured until his spine was broken. Later, his body was found in a car in the Canal San Carlos.

This gas was probably used to murder the journalist Eugenio Lira Massi, who in June 1975 was found dead in circumstances not entirely clear, in the room he occupied in Paris, where he worked at the newspaper L'Humanité. In 1990, the journalist Edwin Harrington published in the magazine Nueva Voz that Lira was murdered by the DINA as part of a plan called Operation France after the arrival in the French capital of "Bernardo Conrads Salazar, identity card No. 4.152.556-6, official of the security service of the dictatorship." Harrington, who cited an FBI report as one of his main sources, argued that Lira's death may have been triggered by sarin gas, which Townley carried on his travels in a bottle of Chanel perfume.

Another suspicious death was that of Alfred Schaak, a representative of Paul Schäfer in Germany in charge of arms trafficking. In 1985, two couples who fled from Colonia Dignidad publicly denounced Schäfer's pedophilia. It seems that Schaak then wanted to denounce the arms trade. To prevent this, Winfried Schmidtke and Helmut Seelbach, who were received at the airport by Schaak, who was in perfect health, would have traveled from Dignidad to Germany. A few days later, in October, Schaak died suddenly. Dr. Hartmut Hopp went immediately to Germany and brought the body of Schaak to Chile. In the assembly of settlers he said that Schaak had died of fever and that in his will he left his property to the Colony. At the same time they reported – ten months after the fact – the escape of the couples, adding that their complaints in Germany had done them great harm.

The subsequent condemnation of Schäfer does not include sarin gas production in Colonia Dignidad, the Cerro Gallo Massacre, nor the Monte Maravilla forced labor camp that the colony maintained, since Judge Jorge Zepeda Arancibia did not include these charges in the ruling that sentenced him to a minimum term of seven years of imprisonment for infraction of the Law on Arms Control.

=== Simón Bolívar de La Reina barracks ===
Alexei Jaccard, age 25, was arrested in Buenos Aires on 16 May 1977, along with two other communist militants, by agents of the Argentine dictatorship and the DINA. At that time all traces of them were lost. Despite the efforts made by his family to learn his whereabouts, both in Argentina and in Chile, they only turned up false leads. This changed when three agents, who did not lose their memory or declare themselves insane as their former boss Augusto Pinochet had, gave the judiciary unequivocal information about what happened with Jaccard and the two militants, Ricardo Ramírez Herrera and Héctor Velásquez Mardones. The testimonies coincide in that the three detainees, from Buenos Aires, were taken to the La Reina barracks by "Don Jaime" (alias of Captain Germán Barriga, who committed suicide in 2005) and his agents of Dolphin Group, an elite squad that operated inside the Lautaro Brigade. The director of the DINA, Manuel Contreras, always stated in private and in public that Jaccard, Herrera, and Velásquez were arrested by Argentine intelligence, which had made them disappear by throwing their bodies into the Río de la Plata. But the former agents Eduardo Oyarce Riquelme, Héctor Valdebenito Araya, and Guillermo Ferrán Martínez, all prosecuted for the crimes committed in Simón Bolívar, deny that version, and confirm the passage of Jaccard and his companions through that barracks. Former agent Oyarce recalls another relevant piece of information:

They were eliminated with sarin gas, but I can not say who applied it.

== Judicial aspects ==
On 23 July 2007, Judge Alejandro Madrid undertook "two resolutions that mark milestones in the trials for human rights violations" and that are related to the Andrea Project: "He affirmed that the murder of the ex-Army corporal Manuel Leyton was carried out using sarin gas, and prosecuted thirteen former DINA agents for this crime. He proceeded to prosecute the former Army auditor, Fernando Torres Silva, for conspiracy in the case of the murder with the chemical that produced the poisonous element in the security services, Eugenio Berríos."

== FBI investigation ==
The FBI has evidence confirming that Augusto Pinochet accumulated large amounts of poison gas, according to Saul Landau, the US investigator for the Orlando Letelier murder. The FBI investigated the sarin, and its conclusions were condensed in a report indicating that it was manufactured in an amount sufficient to kill the entire Peruvian Army twice over.

The explicit orders were to locate Letelier's residence and place of work and contact the Cuban Nationalist Movement (MNC) group so that we could eliminate him with sarin, by running him over or other accident, by any method, but for Letelier, the Chilean government wanted him dead.

— Michael Townley

== Book La danza de los cuervos ==
In 2012, Javier Rebolledo published La danza de los cuervos (The Dance of the Crows), a book describing the atrocities committed in the Simón Bolívar barracks. He then premiered the movie El Mocito, in which the experiences of a boy who worked in the Simón Bolívar House of Extermination are related. It details the torture and suffering of the political abductees, and mention is made of the use of sarin gas to exterminate the prisoners.

== See also ==
- Operation Condor
- Project Coast
