= Osvaldo Romo =

Chilean security official (1938–2007)

- Born: 20 April 1938
- Died: 4 July 2007 (aged 69); Santiago, Chile
- Employer: National Intelligence Directorate (1973-1977)
- Political party: Popular Socialist Union (-1973)
- Movement: Revolutionary Left Movement (-1973)

Osvaldo Romo Carlos Mena (20 April 1938 – 4 July 2007) was a neighborhood leader and central committee member of the MIR, member of the Popular Socialist Union, and a civilian agent of the Chilean Dirección de Inteligencia Nacional (DINA) from 1973 to 1977, during the military dictatorship of Augusto Pinochet. Romo was involved in the forced disappearance of over one hundred people, including Christians for Socialism and MIR members Diana Arón Svigilsky, Manuel Cortez Joo and Ofelio Lazo. He was sentenced to life imprisonment, but several of the sentences were suspended by the Chilean Supreme Court.

== Life ==
=== Left-wing activism ===
Osvaldo Romo became known in working-class neighborhoods before Pinochet's coup in 1973 as a leftist activist, member of the Popular Socialist Union (USOPO) and MIR central comitee member. Romo was a neighborhood leader in Lo Hermida, a low-class neighborhood in Santiago, moving between the Vietnam Heroico camps, Nueva La Habana and other enclaves run by the Revolutionary Left Movement (MIR). At that time, Romo was a member of the Popular Socialist Union (USOPO), for which he ran for city councilor in Ñuñoa and for deputy in Puerto Montt and Llanquihue, an election in which he obtained approximately 400 votes. This political party advocated a moderate strategy and maintained its distance from the more radical groups.

=== Life since 11th September 1973 ===
Following the coup, he reappeared in these neighborhoods in a military uniform, without being part of the Army, arresting his friends and contacts, becoming an informer of the DINA. There are still debates in left-wing circles over whether Romo suddenly changed his political orientation or if he had always been a mole for the Chilean security services.

He joined the DINA, where he served as a civilian collaborator under the command of Brigadier Miguel Krassnoff in the Halcón I unit (part of the Caupolicán Brigade, which had orders to neutralize the MIR’s activities at any cost). Romo expressed alleged disappointment at having been active in the far left, which is why he had decided to neutralize such groups. According to Krassnoff, while Romo was his collaborator, he served only as an informant; Krassnoff takes no responsibility for the subsequent events described by Romo.

Known as Guatón Romo ("Fatso Romo") or Comandante Raúl, he was one of DINA's civilian key torturers, operating in centers such as Villa Grimaldi. On April 11, 1995, in an interview televised by Univisión, he commented in great detail, and evidently without remorse, on the techniques that had been used in the centers. These included the application of electricity to women's nipples and genitals, the use of dogs, and insertion of rats into women's vaginas.

—Would you do it again? Would you do it the same way?

—Sure, I'd do the same and more. I wouldn't leave anybody alive (...) That was one of DINA's mistakes. I was always arguing with my general: don't leave that person alive, don't let that person go free. There are consequences.
—As for throwing the corpses of the prisoners into the sea...
—I think it could have happened. (...) Throwing them into the crater of a volcano would be better... (...) Who'd go looking for them in a volcano? Nobody.
—On the day you die... what would your epitaph say? "Here lies the hangman, the torturer, the murderer..."

—Logical, logical. I accept that. But for me it was a positive thing. (...) I am at peace with my conscience and my beliefs.

— Excerpt from the interview,

== Life in Brazil and arrest ==
In 1977, Romo was sent to Brazil by his superiors, and may have participated in death squads there, according to human rights NGOs. During Chile's transition to democracy, as one of the most important figures of the Pinochet regime, Romo was sought by prosecutors and found living in São Paulo with his wife and five children in June 1992.

Arrested by the Brazilian police, he was extradited to Chile in November 1992. He was sentenced to ten years in prison for the kidnapping of MIR member Manuel Cortez Joo and five years and a day for the kidnapping of Ofelio Lazo, who disappeared in July 1974.

Romo, suffering from diabetes and heart failure, was moved to the hospital of Santiago Penitentiary on 3 July 2007, and died the following day. His funeral was held on 5 July at the Cementerio General de Santiago, with no one in attendance.
