= Directorate of National Intelligence =

Chilean secret police under the Pinochet dictatorship (1973–1977)

National Intelligence Directorate Dirección de Inteligencia Nacional DINA
- Seal of the DINA
- Abbreviation: DINA

Agency overview
- Formed: November 1973 (de facto); June 14, 1974 (by decree)
- Dissolved: August 13, 1977
- Superseding agency: National Information Center (CNI)
- Employees: c. 2,500 (1974); by some estimates over 9,000 by 1977

Jurisdictional structure
- Operations jurisdiction: Chile
- General nature: Secret police

Operational structure
- Headquarters: Santiago, Chile
- Elected officer responsible: Augusto Pinochet, President of the Governing Junta
- Agency executive: Manuel Contreras, Director
- Parent agency: Government Junta

The Dirección de Inteligencia Nacional (DINA; pronounced [diɾeɣˈsjon de inteliˈxensja nasjoˈnal], lit. 'National Intelligence Directorate') was the secret police agency of Chile during the first years of the military dictatorship of Augusto Pinochet. Formed as a Chilean Army intelligence unit in the weeks after the 1973 coup d'état, it was placed on an independent legal footing by Decree Law 521 of June 14, 1974, reporting directly to the ruling military junta rather than to the armed forces' regular chain of command. It was headed throughout its existence by Army colonel (later general) Manuel Contreras, who answered personally to Pinochet and became, in the assessment of American diplomats and of DINA's own agents, the second-most-powerful man in Chile.

DINA has been described by journalists and historians as "Pinochet's Gestapo." Operating under the wide powers granted to the government during the near-continuous state of emergency of the dictatorship's early years, DINA agents ran a network of clandestine detention and torture centers—among them Villa Grimaldi, Londres 38, the José Domingo Cañas house, and the Simón Bolívar barracks—through which several thousand political prisoners passed; hundreds more were forcibly disappeared or executed. The organization also directed foreign operations, including the 1974 car-bomb assassination of General Carlos Prats in Buenos Aires and the 1976 car-bomb assassination of former minister Orlando Letelier and his American colleague Ronni Karpen Moffitt in Washington, D.C., and it served as the founding and leading member of Operation Condor, a intelligence-sharing and assassination network among South American security services.

From 1974 the U.S. Central Intelligence Agency cultivated a relationship with DINA and, for several months in 1975, paid Contreras directly as an intelligence asset, even as U.S. officials privately regarded him as the chief obstacle to a more humane human-rights policy within the junta. DINA was dissolved in August 1977 and replaced by the National Information Center (CNI), a successor agency with a similar mission but a different organizational structure. Contreras and dozens of other former agents were later convicted by Chilean courts of kidnapping, torture, and homicide; Contreras died in 2015 while serving cumulative sentences of more than 500 years. Prosecutions connected to DINA's crimes, including the Letelier–Moffitt case, have continued into the 21st century.

== Background and creation ==
DINA had its roots in the Army's existing internal-intelligence body, the Dirección de Inteligencia del Ejército (DINE, Army Intelligence Directorate). On November 13, 1973, two months after the coup that overthrew President Salvador Allende, Pinochet appointed Army engineer lieutenant colonel Manuel Contreras Sepúlveda—known within the officer corps by the nickname "Mamo"—to head DINE. (Note: Family accounts hold that as an infant Contreras attempted to say "mamá" and instead said "mamo," and the nickname stuck within his circle.) Although it did not yet exist on paper, the new agency was functioning de facto by the end of 1973, absorbing officers who had taken part in the Caravan of Death, the death squad that had toured Chile executing political prisoners in the weeks after the coup.

DINA was formally created and separated from the regular Army command structure by Decree Law 521, published in the official gazette on June 14, 1974, which placed the new agency under the direct authority of the Government Junta rather than the Army high command. The Chilean intelligence community approved the proposal over the objection of Carabineros intelligence chief General Germán Segundo Campos Vásquez, who warned that it would create a body answerable to no institutional oversight save the commander-in-chief himself. Under the decree, DINA could detain, interrogate under duress, and confine individuals in its own facilities for as long as a state of emergency remained in force—a condition that persisted for nearly the whole of DINA's existence.

DINA's guiding doctrine held that the junta was engaged in an undeclared internal war against an enemy that gave no quarter—Marxist subversion, left-wing parties, and open critics of the regime—and that no method, legal or otherwise, was to be spared in winning it. From its creation the agency reported to the Government Junta, with Contreras briefing the junta periodically on its operations. American intelligence assessments described him as intensely loyal to Pinochet and dependent on the president's personal backing for his authority.

The Central Intelligence Agency assisted DINA from its earliest days: in February 1974 Pinochet personally asked CIA deputy director Vernon Walters for help during the agency's "formative period," and Walters hosted Contreras for lunch at CIA headquarters in Langley, Virginia, the following month. Despite falling under Pinochet's ultimate legal authority, American-born DINA operative Michael Townley later described Contreras as the organization's real "intellectual head." Pedro Espinoza served as Contreras's deputy for operations.

== Organization and personnel ==
By mid-1974 DINA numbered roughly 600 full-time military agents and civilian contract personnel; by 1977, on the eve of its dissolution, its ranks and network of informants had grown to an estimated several thousand, penetrating most sectors of Chilean society. In 2012, a roster of some 1,500 former agents was made public, including Cristián Labbé, who later served as mayor of the Santiago comune of Providencia from 1996 to 2012. Separately, in 2008 the Chilean Army presented a list of 1,097 DINA agents to Judge Alejandro Solís.

The agency was organized under Contreras into three subdirectorates—Interior, Exterior (Foreign), and Administrative. The Foreign Subdirectorate was headed by Air Force colonel Mario Jahn Barrera, while a separate Foreign Department, run by Army lieutenant colonel Arturo Ureta Sire, handled agents stationed abroad, including José Octavio Zara Holger, Christoph Willike Floel, Alejandro Paulino Campos Rebhein, Ana María Rubio de la Cruz, and Carmen Hidalgo; in Buenos Aires, DINA maintained embassy attachés Víctor Hugo Barría Barría and Carlos Hernán Labarca Sanhueza, along with civilian agent Enrique Arancibia Clavel. A distinct Foreign Division ran the agency's covert operations outside Chile, including the 1974 killing of General Carlos Prats in Buenos Aires.

DINA drew many of its field operatives from the special-forces units of each branch of the armed forces and Carabineros: the Army's Cobra Commandos, the Navy's tactical divers (UBC), the Air Force's special commandos, and the Carabineros' special-operations police commandos, along with marine-infantry personnel. Many operatives, including those posted to the Army's later special units, had trained at the U.S.-run School of the Americas; the agency's early campaign of repression was directed above all at Allende's personal security detail (the GAP), which lost about 60 members, and at the leftist Revolutionary Left Movement (MIR), the Socialist Party, and the Communist Party, which the Spanish-language sources credit with roughly 400, 400, and 350 dead members, respectively.

== Repression and human rights violations ==
Decree Law 521 empowered DINA to detain any individual for as long as a state of emergency remained declared, a condition that covered nearly the whole of the Pinochet government's early years. Torture and rape of detainees were routine practice inside DINA's facilities:

In some camps, routine sadism was taken to extremes. At Villa Grimaldi, recalcitrant prisoners were dragged to a parking lot; DINA agents then used a car or truck to run over and crush their legs. Prisoners there recalled one young man who was beaten with chains and left to die slowly from internal injuries. Rape was also a recurring form of abuse.

Chilean human-rights groups that examined DINA's methods identified electric-shock torture (most often applied to the genitals), beatings, broken limbs, cigarette and acid burns, and suspension by the wrists or ankles as characteristic physical techniques, alongside psychological torture such as mock executions and threats against detainees' relatives. A 1974 fact-finding mission by the Organization of American States documented severe distress among detained women it interviewed, many of whom described physical and sexual abuse they had suffered during interrogation, and recorded similarly detailed accounts of electric shock, burns, mock executions, and threats against family members from male detainees.

According to a coalition of European human-rights researchers, the government's own 1991 truth commission (the Rettig Commission) documented 2,279 people killed or forcibly disappeared for political reasons; a 1996 update raised the total to roughly 3,197, including some 1,102 people still unaccounted for. A separate 2004 commission chaired by the Catholic bishop Sergio Valech found that 27,255 people had been arbitrarily detained for political reasons, the great majority of whom reported having been tortured. DINA was directly responsible for a large share of the secret arrests, torture, and disappearances carried out during the dictatorship's first four years, before responsibility passed to its successor agency.

=== Secret detention centers ===
DINA operated dozens of clandestine detention and torture facilities in Santiago and elsewhere, of which Villa Grimaldi—a requisitioned estate on the capital's outskirts, officially designated "Cuartel Terranova"—was the largest and best known. An estimated 4,500 prisoners passed through Villa Grimaldi between 1974 and 1978, and hundreds of them were killed or forcibly disappeared. Other major DINA facilities included the Londres 38 townhouse in downtown Santiago, the José Domingo Cañas house, the Simón Bolívar barracks used against Communist Party members, and "Venda Sexy," a house on Irán Street notorious for the systematic sexual abuse of blindfolded prisoners.

== Role of Manuel Contreras ==
Although he answered nominally to Pinochet, Contreras exercised broad personal control over DINA's operations and is generally credited with having built the organization from the ground up. As DINA's leader and one of Pinochet's closest confidants, Contreras became, in the words of American diplomats, the second-most-powerful man in the country. In a March 1978 letter to Contreras written under the alias "J. Andreas Wilson," Townley addressed him deferentially as "Don Manuel" and acknowledged the authority Contreras held over him. Discussing the Letelier–Moffitt assassination years afterward, Townley described how Contreras had managed to keep Pinochet from learning the full truth of the operation.

Contreras also directed DINA's covert financial apparatus and, according to several former subordinates, cultivated ties to prominent businessmen for off-the-books funding of the agency's operations (see § Financing below). He remained head of DINA until its dissolution in 1977, when he was replaced as head of the successor CNI by General Odlanier Mena.

=== Relationship with the CIA ===
The 2000 CIA report CIA Activities in Chile found that between 1974 and 1977 the agency maintained regular, paid contact with Contreras, notwithstanding internal assessments that identified him as the principal obstacle to a workable U.S. human-rights policy toward the junta. U.S. policymakers judged the relationship, however uncomfortable, to be necessary given Contreras's position atop Chile's principal intelligence organization; in 1975 an interagency review in Washington instructed the CIA to continue the relationship despite the same conclusion about his obstruction of a reasonable human-rights policy. The U.S. ambassador in Santiago, David H. Popper, urged the CIA's deputy director to receive Contreras in Washington in August 1975 in the interest of preserving good relations with Pinochet, even as elements within the agency weighed placing Contreras on a paid footing to secure his privileged access to intelligence and to Pinochet himself; the CIA did so briefly in mid-1975. Contreras publicly acknowledged elements of this relationship in December 2004, while insisting that Operation Condor amounted only to informal coordination among Southern Cone intelligence services rather than a network for extrajudicial killing.

== Foreign operations, Operation Condor, and assassinations ==
=== Michael Townley and the "Wasp Group" ===
American-born chemist Michael Townley, who joined DINA in 1974, later confessed in writing to having served as the agency's lead foreign assassin. Townley went on to lead a special unit known as the Agrupación Avispa (Wasp Group), operating under DINA's Mulchén Brigade and tasked specifically with eliminating opponents of the regime.

=== Founding of Operation Condor ===
DINA organized and led Operation Condor, a coordination network among the intelligence services of Argentina, Bolivia, Brazil, Chile, Paraguay, and Uruguay (with Colombia, Peru, and Venezuela participating more sporadically) that shared intelligence and, in numerous cases, tracked down and killed exiled political opponents across national borders. In October 1975, Contreras sent invitations to the heads of the region's secret police agencies to a "Working Meeting of National Intelligence" to be held in Santiago between November 25 and December 1, 1975; the surviving invitation, addressed to Paraguayan general Francisco Britez, is the earliest documentary evidence of the founding conference, at which the delegates chose to name their new network after Chile's national bird, the condor.

=== Assassinations of Carlos Prats and Orlando Letelier ===
DINA agents, working with international collaborators including Townley, assassinated exiled former Army commander-in-chief Carlos Prats and his wife, Sofía Cuthbert, by car bomb in Buenos Aires, Argentina, in September 1974. Two years later, on September 21, 1976, Townley and a team of Cuban exile collaborators killed former Chilean minister Orlando Letelier and his American colleague Ronni Karpen Moffitt with a remote-detonated car bomb in Washington, D.C. In an account written after his arrest, Townley recorded that he had received the order for the Letelier operation from Contreras's deputy, Pedro Espinoza.

In 1978, Generals Manuel Contreras and Odlanier Mena met with the Junta to resolve the matter of Townley’s extradition to the U.S., and it was stated in the meeting that neither the Junta nor Pinochet himself knew of Townley’s existence. General Contreras lied and assured them he had no connection to Townley, something he also denied three times in 1976. Based on those assurances, he was handed over to the U.S. Since Townley also participated in the assassination attempts on Prats and Leighton, and Pinochet was accused by the U.S. justice system of the attack on Orlando Letelier. Previously Townley asked Contreras to "to tell his Excellency [Pinochet] the truth of this situation, so that he can use his authority as he can". The U.S. intelligence believed the attack on Letelier was ordered by Pinochet, without knowing the details of the Dina-Junta meetings.

DINA captain Armando Fernández Larios was later found to have arranged false passports for members of the hit squad, including for Townley himself. Declassified U.S. State Department records show that Washington had advance warning that Condor member states, including Chile, were planning assassinations of political opponents abroad, but that draft cables alerting the potential targets were withdrawn shortly before the Letelier–Moffitt killings.

In the Michael Townley trial, and interviews, attributed responsibility for the orders to the DINA. In contrast, Chilean military officers Raúl Iturriaga Neumann and Manuel Contreras claimed that the assassination orders received by Townley in the various Chile-related cases came exclusively from the CIA, questioning his account and accusing him of lying to implicate the DINA and Pinochet, a thesis that Townley anticipated and explicitly denied in his private confessions.

In June 2026, following a fourteen-year investigation opened after a 2012 court order, Chilean human-rights magistrate Judge Paola Plaza González convicted three former DINA officers—retired brigadier general Pedro Espinoza Bravo, retired brigadier general José Octavio Zara Holger, and retired general Raúl Eduardo Iturriaga Neumann—of the qualified homicide of Ronni Moffitt, sentencing each to fifteen years in prison; her 138-page ruling found the operation had been carried out under Contreras's direction. Moffitt's niece, Rebecca Karpen, said the ruling came fifty years after the killing and after the deaths of several relatives who had pursued the case for decades. Zara Holger, who had separately just completed a fifteen-year sentence for the 1974 killing of Carlos Prats and his wife, was rearrested within a day of his release to answer for his role in the Letelier–Moffitt case.

=== Chemical weapons program ===
Beginning in 1975, Townley and DINA chemist Eugenio Berríos operated a clandestine chemical-weapons laboratory, known internally as Project Andrea, at a DINA-owned house on Vía Naranja in the Lo Curro district of Santiago; there Berríos experimented with sarin and other nerve agents on animals before the substances were reportedly used against several individuals whose deaths were made to look like natural causes or accidents. The laboratory later drew logistical support from Colonia Dignidad, a secretive German settler colony that also served as a DINA detention site. Berríos, who was murdered in Uruguay in 1992 after fleeing Chile to avoid testifying about the program, had separately developed ties to narcotics traffickers and to agents of the U.S. Drug Enforcement Administration.

=== Other foreign operations ===
In 1975, Cuban exile Virgilio Paz Romero, working on assignment for DINA, traveled to Northern Ireland and covertly photographed prisons run by the Northern Ireland Prison Service. Chile's government had intended to display the photographs at the United Nations headquarters in New York to counter British criticism of Chilean human-rights abuses, but they arrived too late for that purpose and were instead published in the Santiago newspaper El Mercurio. An undated letter from Townley to Pinochet describing Paz Romero's assignment was intercepted by the American National Security Agency.

DINA's Foreign Division was also active against exiled Chileans in Argentina, where its agents circulated a fabricated story about an affair between actress Graciela Alfano and Admiral Emilio Massera, a member of the Argentine military junta, apparently to damage Massera's standing.

== Financing ==
DINA's financial operations were run by former Navy officer Humberto Olavarría Aranguren, who created or acquired a network of front companies to fund the agency's activities at home and abroad. In January 1974, with a starting capital of 200,000 escudos, DINA formed Servicios Industriales Villar y Reyes Ltda., trading as "Dinaservice Ltda.," ostensibly to provide industrial services but in practice used to pay agents' salaries; ownership was transferred by the end of the year to a company controlled by retired army colonel Alberto Elissalde Müller and lawyer Miguel Ángel Armando Poblete Rodríguez.

Also in 1974, DINA took control of two state-linked fishing companies based in San Antonio, Empresa Pesquera Arauco and Empresa Pesquera de Chile, with Hubert Fuchs Asenjo as general manager and legal representative of both; the companies were later found to have been used to detain and transport prisoners during the dictatorship. The agency subsequently established further front companies, including an import-export firm, an electronics-services company, a refrigeration firm, and an agricultural concern, and it operated three Panamanian companies with the assistance of lawyer (and future Panamanian president) Guillermo Endara, represented locally by Army officer and DINA lawyer Marcos Acuña Ramos.

According to former agent Jorgelino Vergara—known as "El Mocito"—businessman Ricardo Claro maintained close ties to Contreras and helped finance DINA's operations. Another significant source of funding came from the seizure of assets from left-wing parties and their members, often in the context of kidnappings and killings, both within Chile and abroad.

In October 2013, the Spanish news agency EFE reported the discovery of a secret DINA bank account, known internally as "DINAR" after a fictitious "National Rehabilitation Directorate," held at two branches of the Banco de Crédito e Inversiones near DINA headquarters. In 1975 alone, Contreras drew roughly 1.6 billion escudos from the account—more than 59,000 times the era's monthly minimum wage—including twelve checks totaling 165.6 million escudos made out directly to the Government Junta, along with substantial payments to Army commands, the Army's arms factory (FAMAE), and the Central Bank. Victims' groups characterized the revelation as evidence that repression had been an institutional policy of the Chilean state, financed in part through channels that also reached the press.

In 2017, the human-rights group Londres 38 filed a criminal complaint for kidnapping, illicit association, and illegal burial against several executives of Pesquera Arauco—including Olavarría Aranguren, retired colonel Orlando Jorquera Bravo, DINA operations director Pedro Espinoza Bravo, Army major Alejandro Burgos De Beer, and Gerardo Godoy García—over their alleged roles in the disappearance of prisoners transported by the company.

== Testimony and accounts of daily life ==
Journalists and researchers who documented life under the dictatorship, including Patricia Politzer, conducted clandestine interviews with people affected by DINA's actions, later published as Fear in Chile: Lives Under Pinochet. The book recounts, among other testimonies, a mother whose son—a sympathizer of the left—was forcibly disappeared and never accounted for even after Pinochet left power, and a woman who survived being shot alongside other detainees and reflected that had she died, her children would have been left without a parent. Accounts of this kind illustrate the broader toll DINA's operations took on the families of the disappeared, many of whom continue to search for information about missing relatives.

== Legal proceedings ==
=== Antonio Llidó case ===
Spanish-born priest Antonio Llidó was detained illegally in October 1974 for aiding members of the MIR and was last seen at the clandestine Cuatro Álamos detention site. In May 2003, nine former DINA members—including Contreras, Marcelo Moren Brito, Miguel Krassnoff, Osvaldo Romo, Maximiliano Ferrer Lima, Fernando Lauriani Maturana, Orlando Manzo Durán, Ciro Torré Sáez, and Basclay Zapata—were indicted for his kidnapping. In September 2008, Judge Jorge Zepeda convicted Contreras and three other agents, sentencing them to seven years' imprisonment and ordering the state to pay Llidó's sister an indemnity of roughly 100 million pesos (about €126,000). On appeal, Chile's Supreme Court reduced the sentences in August 2010, giving Contreras, Moren Brito, Krassnoff, and Zapata five years each with the benefit of supervised release, while acquitting Ferrer Lima, Lauriani Maturana, and Manzo Durán for lack of proven participation.

=== Disappearance of Cecilia Bojanic and Flavio Oyarzún ===
Cecilia Bojanic, five months pregnant, and her partner Flavio Oyarzún were detained on October 2, 1974, and taken to a DINA detention site on José Domingo Cañas Street; both were MIR militants and left behind an infant son. In 2002, a Chilean judge indicted retired brigadier Maximiliano Ferrer Lima as a suspect in their kidnapping. In 2006, Contreras and former civilian agent Osvaldo Romo Mena were sentenced to ten years in prison for the kidnapping, while Ferrer Lima, Lauriani Maturana, Moren Brito, and Krassnoff received four-year terms and Manzo Durán three years as an accomplice, with the benefit of supervised release. The Supreme Court upheld Contreras's ten-year sentence in 2009 while confirming supervised release for the other four.

=== Operation Colombo prosecutions ===
In 1975, DINA staged what became known as Operation Colombo, falsely representing 119 disappeared leftists as having been killed abroad in factional violence in order to conceal their murder by the Chilean state. On January 4, 2004, Judge Juan Guzmán indicted ten former DINA agents, including Contreras, for the disappearance of eight of the operation's victims—the second such indictment he issued in the case, after charging sixteen agents in September 2003 over 37 other victims. Those indicted, all in retirement and charged as authors of qualified kidnapping, included Contreras; the former head of DINA's Metropolitan Intelligence Brigade, General César Manríquez Bravo; Contreras's deputy, brigadier Pedro Espinoza Bravo; the former head of Villa Grimaldi, colonel Marcelo Moren Brito; the former head of the Cuatro Álamos facility, Orlando Manzo Durán; the former head of DINA's "Halcón" (Falcon) group, brigadier Miguel Krassnoff Martchenko; former Army intelligence officer Francisco Ferrer Lima, already serving a sentence for the killing of union leader Tucapel Jiménez; the former head of the Tres Álamos facility, Conrado Pacheco Cárdenas; non-commissioned officer Basclay Zapata Reyes; and former civilian agent Osvaldo Romo Mena.

=== Prosecution for torture ===
In June 2005, Judge Alejandro Solís indicted nine former senior DINA members—Contreras, Espinoza, Krassnoff, Moren Brito, Romo, Zapata, Gerardo Godoy, Fernando Laureani, and Francisco Ferrer Lima—as authors of unlawful torture and coercion.

=== Assassination of Letelier and Moffitt ===
Contreras and Espinoza were convicted in Chile in 1993 as the intellectual authors of the Letelier–Moffitt bombing and were sentenced to seven and six years' imprisonment, respectively; Townley, along with several Cuban exile collaborators, was separately convicted in the United States. In June 2026, Judge Paola Plaza González convicted three additional former DINA officers—Espinoza Bravo, Zara Holger, and Iturriaga Neumann—of the qualified homicide of Ronni Moffitt specifically, sentencing each to fifteen years, in a ruling issued fifty years after the killing (see § Assassinations of Carlos Prats and Orlando Letelier above).

=== Other investigations ===
In 2009, La Nación reported that a number of former agents, including some already convicted of human-rights crimes, continued to draw salaries from the Army for consulting work, among them veterans of DINA's Mulchén, Rengo, and Leopardo units. (Note: Retired colonel Sergio Castillo González, a member of the officer cadre that formed DINA's first agent contingent at Rocas de Santo Domingo in late 1973, received a monthly Army stipend for "career-development consulting"; he later commanded the Leopardo group and was indicted in 2008 in connection with the Operation Colombo disappearances.) Other beneficiaries identified in the report included a former military prosecutor accused of falsifying documents to cover up the killing of diplomat Carmelo Soria, an Army physician accused of torturing prisoners, and the agent who had helped Eugenio Berríos leave Chile before his 1992 murder.

== Dissolution and legacy ==
DINA was dissolved by decree in August 1977 and replaced by the National Information Center (CNI), with Contreras succeeded as intelligence chief by General Odlanier Mena. By the time of its dissolution, DINA had largely achieved the military objectives set for it at its founding: the elimination of the MIR's leadership and of the principal figures of the Popular Unity coalition that had won the 1970 election. The CNI itself operated until February 1990, when it was dissolved by Law No. 18,943 shortly before Chile's formal return to civilian rule.

After the return of civilian government, Contreras was prosecuted repeatedly for crimes committed while he headed DINA. In the case of MIR militant Miguel Ángel Sandoval, he was sentenced to twelve years and one day for qualified kidnapping; the Supreme Court unanimously rejected the defense's bid for amnesty in November 2004, ruling that the disappearance constituted a continuing offense not subject to the 1978 amnesty decree. In a separate case, over the disappearance of MIR militant Diana Arón, a divided panel of the Santiago Court of Appeals—including Judge Víctor Montiglio, who had taken over Judge Juan Guzmán Tapia's docket of human-rights cases after Guzmán's retirement—voted in June 2005 to apply the amnesty law and set aside a 15-year sentence against Contreras and four other former DINA officers. The Supreme Court unanimously overturned that ruling in May 2006 and reinstated the conviction.

On June 30, 2008, Judge Alejandro Solís sentenced Contreras to two life terms for the murders of Carlos Prats and his wife, Sofía Cuthbert, plus an additional twenty-year term for leading the illicit association that carried out the bombing. By the time of his death on August 7, 2015, at age 86, he was serving 59 unappealable sentences totaling more than 500 years in prison for kidnapping, torture, and homicide, making him the Chilean officer with the largest cumulative number of human-rights convictions.

DINA's activities also drew scrutiny in the United States. Beginning in late 2014, at the request of Senate Armed Services Committee chairman Carl Levin, the Department of Defense's Inspector General investigated the William J. Perry Center for Hemispheric Defense Studies, a Pentagon-run institute for hemispheric security studies, following whistleblower allegations that it had knowingly retained a professor connected to DINA and that other staff had links to the 2009 Honduran coup d'état. Senator Patrick Leahy, author of the Leahy Law restricting U.S. assistance to foreign forces implicated in human-rights abuses, called reports of the institution's hiring practices "stunning" and "repulsive."

In September 2013, the magazine The Clinic published a leaked 1976 DINA field manual, running to 108 pages, detailing tradecraft for clandestine operations, informant networks, and covert communications, and instructing officers on infiltrating opposition organizations and using blackmail and payments to recruit informers inside rival parties. The manual explicitly advised agents to exploit the public's assumption that the law would not be broken, and instructed them to take drastic measures when deemed necessary, with the acknowledgment that the military high command was aware such measures might exceed legal limits. Historians have cited its emergence as further evidence of the systematic, state-directed character of Chile's political repression during the dictatorship's early years.

== See also ==
- Disappearance of Jorge Müller and Carmen Bueno
- Miguel Krassnoff
- Ingrid Olderock
- Project Andrea
- Colonia Dignidad
- Operation Colombo
- Villa Grimaldi
- Rettig Report
- Valech Report
