= Miguel Krassnoff =

Chilean military officer (born 1946)

- Born: Mikhail Semyonovich Krasnov; Михаил Семёнович Краснов; 15 February 1946 (age 80); Tyrol, Allied-occupied Austria
- Education: School of the Americas
- Spouse: María de los Ángeles Bassa Salazar
- Children: 2
- Relatives: Pyotr Krasnov
- Status: Incarcerated at Punta Peuco Prison
- Conviction: Crimes against humanity
- Penalty: 1,007 years imprisonment
- Military career
- Allegiance: Chile
- Branch: Chilean Army
- Rank: Brigadier
- Nicknames: El Ruso; Capitán Miguel; Caballo loco; El perro ra

Miguel Krassnoff Martchenko (né Mikhail Semyonovich Krasnov; Russian: Михаил Семёнович Краснов; born 15 February 1946) is a Chilean military official involved in human rights violations during the dictatorship of General Augusto Pinochet. He held several high-ranking positions in the Pinochet regime, including in the Chilean intelligence agency, DINA. As such, he was responsible for the interrogation, torture, and disappearance of political prisoners at the detention center, Villa Grimaldi. After Pinochet's demise, Krassnoff was convicted by Chilean courts of crimes against humanity.

== Biography ==
=== Early life ===
Mikhail Semyonovich Krasnov (Russian: Михаил Семёнович Краснов) was born on 15 February 1946 in Tyrol, Allied-occupied Austria (present-day Austria) to Semyon Nikolayevich Krasnov and Dina Vladimirovna Marchenko.

His father was a Russian White Army soldier who, after the Empire's defeat in the Russian Civil War, fled to Yugoslavia and then to France, arriving in Nazi Germany in 1942. After the defeat of Germany in World War II, he was extradited back to the Soviet Union along with his relative, General Pyotr Krasnov. There, both men were put on trial and executed. As a result of this, young Miguel and his mother, Dina Marchenko, fled to Chile.

Pyotr Krasnov was a Don Cossack historian and Lieutenant General who became one of the leaders of the counter-revolutionary White movement and later a Nazi collaborator who mobilized Cossack forces to fight against the Soviet Union during World War II.

Miguel grew up speaking Russian at home and learned about the experiences of his ancestors. He believed that it was his fate to fight against communism but denies that he ever acted in the name of family revenge.

=== Career ===
Krassnoff was educated at the School of the Americas in Panama, before he returned to Chile. Upon his arrival, he served as Professor of Ethics at the Chilean Military Academy. On 11 September 1973, still serving his professorship, Krassnoff participated in the assault on the house of Chile's socialist president, Salvador Allende, which culminated in the 1973 Chilean coup d'état.

After the coup, he was appointed to the National Intelligence Directorate (DINA)—the Chilean secret police—under Manuel Contreras. Krassnoff became director of the agency's two Halcón (Falcon) units, which were part of the Caupolicán Group. In turn, the group reported to the Brigada de Inteligencia Metropolitana (BIM). The BIM was ultimately responsible for suppressing political opposition in the Santiago region and the operation of detention camps in the region, including the Villa Grimaldi. The fate of the prisoners was decided by the group commanders and then relayed to the DINA headquarters via the BIM.

In 1979, after the dissolution of DINA, Krassnoff was assigned to Defence Intelligence. He later regretted that he was barred from becoming military attaché to the Soviet Union or securing a promotion to the rank of general because of his previous involvement in DINA.

=== Crimes against humanity and conviction ===
Krasnoff was one of the army officers involved in planning and administering Villa Grimaldi, the detention camp implicated in the torture of Chilean citizens under the Pinochet regime. He is referenced several times in the testimonies of Luz Arce, a prisoner and torture victim at Villa Grimaldi and later a collaborator with the regime. In 2006, Krassnoff was sentenced to 144 years imprisonment for over 20 counts of crimes against humanity. In 2016, he was also sentenced to 10 years imprisonment for the 1974 abduction of José Ramírez Rosales.

== Personal life ==
Krassnoff is married to María de los Ángeles Bassa Salazar with whom he has two children.

== Bibliography ==
- Lazzara, M. J. (2011). Shame and Reconciliation. In Luz Arce and Pinochet's Chile. Palgrave Macmillan US.
- Wyndham, M., & Read, P. (2014). The disappearing museum. Rethinking History, 18(2), 165–180.
