= Valech Report =

2004 Chilean report on the Pinochet-era abuses

The Valech Report, officially known as The National Commission on Political Imprisonment and Torture Report, documents instances of abuses committed in Chile between 1973 and 1990 by agents of Augusto Pinochet's military regime. Published on November 29, 2004, the report presents the findings of a six-month investigation. A revised version was subsequently released on June 1, 2005. In February 2010, the commission was reopened for a period of eighteen months, during which additional cases were examined.

According to the commission's findings, a total of 38,254 individuals were imprisoned for political reasons, with a majority of them subjected to torture. In addition to the cases documented in the earlier Rettig Report, the commission also revealed that thirty individuals had either disappeared or been executed.

The testimonies obtained during the investigation have been classified and will remain confidential for the next fifty years, until 2054. Consequently, these records cannot be utilized in trials pertaining to human rights violations. This stands in contrast to the "Archives of Terror" in Paraguay and Operation Condor. Associations representing former political prisoners have been denied access to the testimonies.

== Commission ==
The report was prepared at the request of President Ricardo Lagos by the National Commission on Political Imprisonment and Torture, which consisted of eight members. The commission was headed by Bishop Sergio Valech and made the report public through the Internet. The members of the commission included María Luisa Sepúlveda as the executive vice president, as well as lawyers Miguel Luis Amunátegui, Luciano Fouillioux, José Antonio Gómez (PRSD president), Lucas Sierra, Álvaro Varela, and psychologist Elizabeth Lira. The commission did not include any representatives of the victims or members of the associations of ex-political prisoners.

To ensure the inclusiveness of their work, the Commission coordinated closely with regional and national organizations of former political prisoners, as well as human rights organizations. Their collaboration aimed to establish contact with relevant individuals who could provide testimonies. To reach a wide audience, advertisements were broadcast on national and local radio and television stations, as well as published in national and local newspapers.

The number of individuals who came forward to testify aligned with the geographic distribution of inhabitants in both the capital city and the provinces.

== Findings ==
=== First part ===
The initial report was based on testimony given to the commission by 35,865 people, of which 27,255 were regarded as "direct victims". Of these, 94% said they were tortured. Eleven people were born in prison, and ninety-one underage children were detained with their parents (including four unborn babies); these were not considered "direct victims". Another group of 978 people were minors at the time of their arrest. Four women were pregnant at the time of their arrest and were tortured; their children were considered "direct victims". A child who was the result of a rape while in prison was also considered a "direct victim". Victims were detained for six months, on average.

Out of the more than 8,600 rejected cases, 7,290 people requested that their cases be revised. The commission also agreed to investigate a further 166 cases which were not considered the first time around. The updated report added 1,204 new cases, bringing the total number of victims to 28,459. The total number of arrests was 34,690; some people were detained multiple times.

The commission found that approximately 69% of arrests occurred between September 11 and December 31 of 1973, and 19% between January 1973 and August 1977.

=== Second part ===
Under the presidency of Michelle Bachelet the commission was reopened. It reviewed about 32,000 new requests from February 2010 to August 2011. It was to be open for twelve months but due to the high number of requests it was extended for an additional six months. 9,795 cases of torture and thirty cases of disappearances or executions were certified. The new report was presented to President Sebastián Piñera on August 18, 2011 and released on August 26, 2011.

== Aftermath ==
The state provided lifelong monetary compensation to the victims as well as health and education benefits. These are detailed in Law 19,992 and include: a monthly payment of about 113,000 to 129,000 thousand Chilean pesos (in December 2004 prices, subsequently adjusted for inflation), depending on the victim's age; free public healthcare for victims and their parents, spouses or children under twenty-five, or incapacitated children of any age; free education (primary to tertiary) for victims whose studies were interrupted by their imprisonment. There is also a special bonus of four million Chilean pesos for victim's children who were born in captivity or who were detained with their parents while they were minors.

Critics of the Valech Report said that families were falsely claiming that their relatives went missing during the 1973–1990 military regime. There had been reports since 2008 that four people, listed as killed or missing, were alive or had died in unrelated circumstances. These cases have raised questions about the system of verification of victims of dictatorships. The Age newspaper has reported that a total of 1,183 people were killed, or reported missing and presumed dead, and that their names appear on a special memorial at the General Cemetery of Santiago. Clive Foss, in The Tyrants: 2500 years of Absolute Power and Corruption, estimates that 1,500 Chileans were killed or disappeared during the Pinochet regime. Nearly 700 civilians disappeared during the period between 1974 and 1977 after being detained by the Chilean military and police. In October 1977, The New York Times reported that Amnesty International had documented the disappearance of approximately 1,500 Chileans since 1973.

Until May 2012, seventy-six agents had been condemned for human rights violations and sixty-seven were convicted: thirty-six from the Army, twenty-seven Carabineros, two from the Air Force, one from the Navy, and one of the PDI. Three condemned agents died and six agents received conditional sentences. The Chilean justice system holds 350 open cases of "disappeared" persons, illegal detainees, and torture victims during the dictatorial rule. These cases involve 700 military and civilian personnel.

== See also ==
- Chilean coup of 1973
- Rettig Report
- List of truth and reconciliation commissions
