= Cecilia Magni Camino =

Chilean guerilla leader (1956-1988)

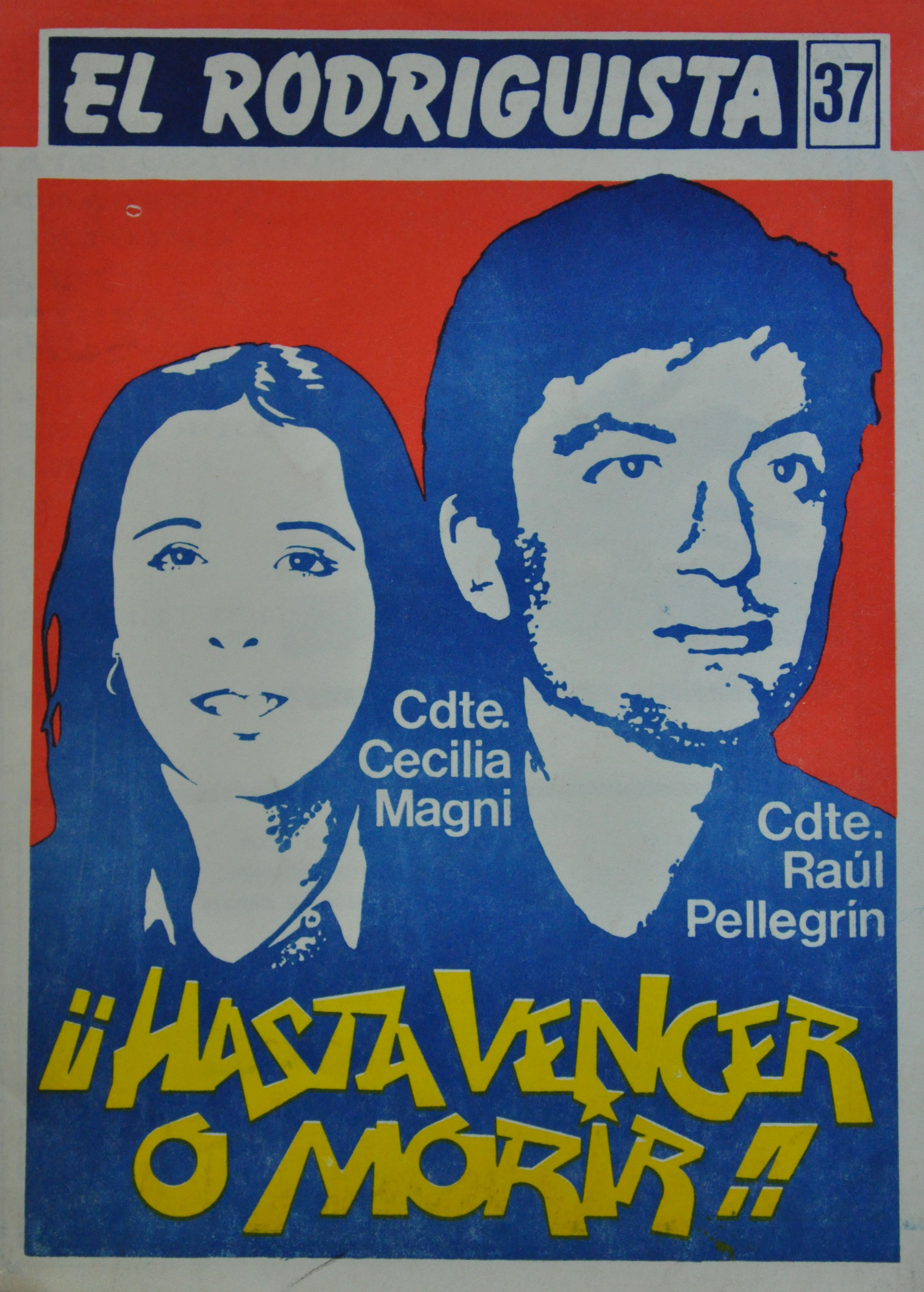
- Cecilia Magni beside Raúl Pellegrin on the cover of the November 1988 edition of El Rodriguista
- Born: February 24, 1956; Santiago, Chile
- Died: October 28, 1988 (aged 32); Los Queñes, Chile
- Other name: Comandante Tamara
- Education: The Grange School; Universidad de Chile
- Occupations: Sociologyst, activist, revolutionary
- Movement: Manuel Rodríguez Patriotic Front
- Partner: Raúl Pellegrin

Cecilia Magni Camino (24 February 1956 – 28 October 1988) was a Chilean guerilla leader and sociologist, better known by the political name Comandante Tamara. She was one of the leaders of the Manuel Rodríguez Patriotic Front (FPMR), a guerilla organization which arose from the Communist Party of Chile in the 1980s to fight against the military dictatorship of Augusto Pinochet.

== Biography ==
Magni was born in Chile to an upper-class family. She was educated in elite schools in Santiago, including The Grange School.

In the mid-1970s, while studying sociology at the University of Chile, she began to identify with the struggle of those opposed to the military dictatorship of Augusto Pinochet, and took part in numerous student demonstrations. By the late 1970s she and her right-wing father, Hugo, had a very strained relationship.

By the 1980s she had married Rafael Walker at Nuestra Senora de los Angeles in El Golf, Santiago. The couple lived in Vitacura. She and Walker joined the ranks of the Young Communists of Chile (JJ.CC.). In 1983, she separated from Walker and began teaching at the University of Valparaiso, where she often hosted student gatherings at her residence.

She became part of the FPMR in February 1984, convinced that "the struggle is the only realistic and valid way to change the course of the country". She left her daughter in the care of a friend and did not contact her family again. Shortly after joining, a fellow member of the Frente dubbed her "Tamara", in reference to Argentine revolutionary Tamara Bunke.

Over time, "Tamara" became a "commander" within FPMR, standing out as the only woman who occupied a command position in the closed leadership of the FPMR. Her work was centered in Santiago de Chile and Rancagua, cities where she recruited new members for the organization and provided logistical support for the emerging combat groups in those regions.

In mid-1986, "Commander Tamara" was given the responsibility of leading one of the riskiest actions undertaken by the FPMR up to that point: the attempted assassination of Augusto Pinochet, also known as Operation 20th Century (Spanish: Operación Siglo XX). During the mission, "Tamara" acted as the right hand of the top leader of the attack, José Joaquín Valenzuela Levi, also known as "Commander Ernesto". Her job was to provide the operational base and the vehicles that would be used in the attack. In late August, she and fellow FPMR member César Bunster rented a house and three vehicles, and coordinating the transfer of the weapons that would be used in the ambush.

Initial plans had Magni acting s a riflewoman in the operation, but she was pulled from the role at the last minute, due to the high probability that the combatants would not come out alive. Magni's experience was deemed too valuable to risk.

After the attack, she went underground until 1988, at the beginning of the failed National Patriotic War. On 21 October 1988, "Commander Tamara" and Raúl Pellegrin, her partner and main commander of the FPMR, led the taking of Los Queñes in the Maule Region. During the assault, they attacked the Los Queñes police checkpoint, which was manned by two police officers. One, Corporal Juvenal Vargas, was killed and the other police officer was wounded. The FPMR stole the officers' weapons and the radio transmitter of the post, cut the telephone cables of the town, and erected the FPMR flag.

In the days following the operation, a significant part of the group was captured by Carabineros who were combing the area. The Front did not hear about Luis Eduardo Arriagada Toro (alias "Bigote") until several weeks later. They realized that he was the informant of the ambush in the Teno River, since he was not on the list of the dead, nor in the secret board. On 28 October 1988, the body of Cecilia Magni was found floating in the Tinguiririca River; her body showed signs of electric shocks and wounds from blunt instruments. Raúl Pellegrin's body was also recovered from the river several days later. The National Commission alleged that the two had been caught by government agents while fleeing the area and had been subsequently tortured. The judicial investigation into her death was prolonged without success for many years, as the courts lacked evidence to attribute her wounds to third parties, and her death was ultimately ruled as accidental. In 2013, the Court of Appeals of Rancagua acquitted the four police officers accused of Magni's killing.

== In popular media ==
The figure of Cecilia Magni has appeared in Chilean film and television, such as the 2012 television film Amar y morir en Chile, directed by Alex Bowen and starring Antonia Zegers as Tamara. The 2020 cinematic film Matar a Pinochet, directed by Juan Ignacio Sabatini, has Daniela Ramírez in the role of Magni.

The play La Compañera follows Camila, Magni's daughter, as she explores her relationship with her deceased mother.
