= Chilean mail bombs case =

2001 terrorist attack in Chile

- Location: Las Condes, Santiago, Chile
- Date: 27 September 2001
- Attack type: Explosive
- Weapon: Mail bomb
- Perpetrators: Lenin Guardia (allegedly); Humberto López

The Chilean mail bombs case was a terrorist attack which occurred on 27 September 2001 at the United States Embassy in Chile, perpetrated by Humberto López Candia, an informant for the Public Security Coordinating Council (CCSP). better known by the informal name from "La Oficina", and by Lenin Guardia Basso, a Chilean sociologist and intelligence analyst, known for having contributed to the dismantling of crime and drug trafficking during the transition to democracy in Chile.

== Events ==
On September 27, 2001, a letter bomb arrived at the United States embassy in Santiago de Chile. It consisted of an electric detonator, ammonium nitrate, trinitrotoluene, a clothespin, an AA battery, and wires. The bomb was successfully destroyed in a controlled demolition. On the same day, another letter-bomb, this one consisting of a solid substance with a high content of nitrates, as well as an A battery and two electrical cables, arrived at the office of lawyer Luis Hermosilla.

The following day, Lenin Guardia called the La Moneda Palace and provided information on the case to Guillermo Miranda, chief of staff of the Ministry of the Interior. In parallel, Humberto López (former member of the MIR and former informant for La Oficina) called Radio Bío-Bío to report what had happened. Guardia also contacted Nelson Mery Figueroa, Chilean detective and then-director of the Investigations Police of Chile, to whom he pointed out that the letter-bombs corresponded to propaganda actions by the supposedly regrouped Manuel Rodríguez Patriotic Front (in Spanish, Frente Patriótico Manuel Rodríguez, FPMR). Guardia then sold Mery a list with the names of public figures against whom the FPMR would allegedly attack: among them were the director of the DISPI, Gustavo Villalobos; lawyer Isidro Solís; Cardinal Francisco Javier Errázuriz; various army officers; and Mary himself. Charged to the reserved expenses of the General Directorate of Investigations, Guardia was paid around 3 million Chilean pesos (over 4000 USD at the time) for the false information, which claimed that a certain "José Antipán" was the reorganizer of the FPMR. Subsequently, these payments for information to Guardia would be denied by the undersecretary of the interior, Jorge Correa Sutil.

Days later, Guardia and Mery met at Mery's house. Guardia took with him two envelopes with explosives similar to those in the letter bombs, and Mery referred them to the minister in charge of the case, Jorge Zepeda, who tried to obtain more information from Guardia. He refused, so the minister accused him of obstruction of justice, ordering his arrest.

Guardia was arrested on November 7, 2001, the same day as López. At the time of his arrest, authorities seized a weapon that had been given to him by General Humberto Gordon, along with two other weapons, one of which had been stolen from a member of the Army. Explosives of the same type as those sent in the envelopes were also found at his home: ammonium nitrate and nitroglycerin.

During the trial, the defenses of both defendants were based on different arguments: Guardia claimed innocence and pointed out that López had deceived him, while López confessed to the crimes and claimed that the attacks were for fame. He attributed Guardia with the original idea, but he confessed that he wrote the envelopes.

In March 2002, Humberto López Candia acknowledged through a letter of repentance that he had fraudulently involved Guardia in the attacks, a situation that he had already sustained in the only confrontation to which Minister Jorge Zepeda Arancibia submitted them.

The magistrate concluded that Guardia and López both tried to take advantage of the commotion caused by the September 11 attacks, which had been carried out weeks before their own mail bomb plot, by creating fictitious situations of terrorism so that politicians and businessmen could hire their security services. Among these setups was an alleged mailing of poisoned chocolates to the headquarters of the Independent Democratic Union. They were also accused of placing a poisoned yogurt in a supermarket belonging to the Unimarc chain, a charge which would later be dropped. The sentence also established that Guardia provided services for months to Nelson Mery and the then Minister of the Interior of the government of Ricardo Lagos, José Miguel Insulza, despite the fact that President Lagos denied that his government was linked to Guardia.

== Sentence ==
Minister Zepeda gave out a prison sentence of 10 years and 300 days against both of the perpetrators for terrorist crimes. Lenin Guardia's sentence was increased by 61 days for violation of the local Weapons Law, given the unregistered weapons seized at his home. On 22 October 2002, the Sixth Chamber of the Santiago Court of Appeals confirmed the sentence, transferring Guardia to serve his sentence in the Punta Peuco prison, originally intended for soldiers convicted of human rights violations.

On December 20, 2006, Lenin Guardia was transferred from Punta Peuco to the High Security Prison of Santiago, as he himself requested. According to a press release,7 Guardia made friends in Punta Peuco with inmates such as Álvaro Corbalán and Carlos Herrera Jiménez, but he requested the transfer citing security reasons, since the other convicts in the compound would have been annoyed by the fact that he received a penalty reduction that has not been granted to them.

Favored by Law No. 19,856 for "outstanding conduct", in January 2007 his sentence was reduced by 8 months (López Candia received 6 months). In March 2007, he requested Sunday release through the regular channels, but was denied. Since June 17, 2007, he has had the benefit of Sunday release, and the Court of Appeals could grant him parole for good conduct.8

On October 15, 2020, the perpetrators asked the authorities to unarchive Guardia Basso's judicial file. The request was presented to the Court of Appeals of Santiago due to a possible lack of precedents in the trial, and even if this were to proceed, their lawyers announced that they would go to the Inter-American Court of Human Rights. On 3 January 2021, the Santiago Court of Appeals confirmed the loss of part of the judicial file, including the reserved notebooks in which the sentence handed down by Minister Jorge Zepeda Arancibia is upheld, documents that Lenin Guardia, according to his lawyer, never had access to. access. For this reason, Lenin Guardia denounced his case to the Inter-American Court of Human Rights.
