= Armed resistance in Chile (1973–1990) =

Armed conflict in Chile

Armed Resistance in Chile
- Part of Operation Condor and the Cold War
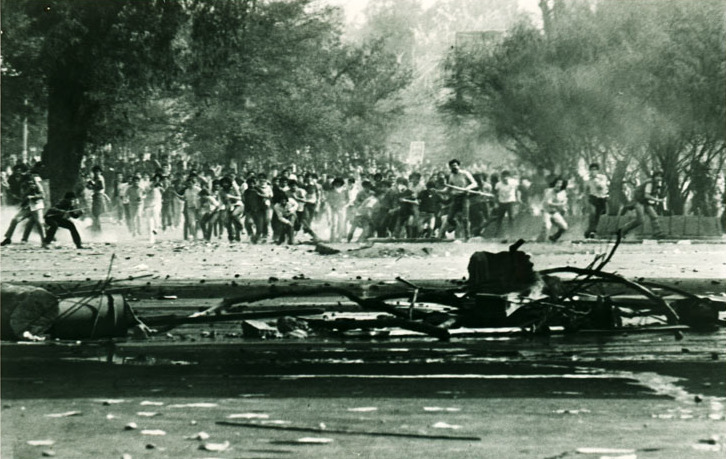
- Left-wing protesters during street riots on 1 May 1984
Date	Pre-dictatorship guerrilla movement: 1968 – 1973; Main conflict: 11 September 1973 – 5 October 1988
Location	Chile
Result	Government military victory Christian Democratic political victory: 1988 referendum; Augusto Pinochet steps down; Chilean transition to democracy

Belligerents
Junta; Chilean Armed Forces; Chilean Army; Chilean Navy; Chilean Air Force; Police forces: Carabineros de Chile; PDI; DINA (1974–1977); CNI (1977–1990); Political support: RN; PN; AN; UDI; Supported by: West Germany; Israel; South Africa; Rhodesia; Brazil; South Korea; China; United Kingdom; Francoist Spain; United States (until 1976) (Note: The Kennedy Amendment to the Foreign Assistance Act (1976) created an US. weapon embargo against Chile)	Guerrillas MIR (1973–1987); FPMR (1983–1997); MAPU Lautaro (1982–1994); MIR-EGP-PL (1987–1994); GAP (1973); Cordones industriales (1973) Political support: PSCh; PCCh; Supported by: Nicaragua; Cuba; Soviet Union; Czechoslovakia; East Germany; Libya; North Korea; EPR (Argentina); Tupamaros (Uruguay); ELN (Bolivia)

Commanders and leaders
Augusto Pinochet (WIA) (President of Chile, Commander-in-chief of the Chilean Army) Others: (Chile) José Merino; (Chile) Gustavo Leigh; (Chile) Fernando Matthei; (Chile) César Mendoza; (Chile) Rodolfo Stange	Prominent rebels: Comité Central MIR; Andrés Pascal Allende; Miguel Enríquez †; Dirección Nacional FPMR; Sergio Apablaza; Raúl Pellegrin (executed); Dirección Nacional Complejo Partidario MAPU Lautaro; Guillermo Ossandón Cañas

Casualties and losses
15 casualties (1973–1977), (military and police); 77 casualties (1977–1990), (military and police)	1,500–2,000 guerrillas killed 49 guerrillas killed hundreds captured
- 97 people killed by DINA & CNI, 26 in the South and 71 in the North (executed) / X

Following the 1973 Chilean coup d'état, an armed leftist resistance movement against Augusto Pinochet's dictatorship developed until 1990 when democracy was restored. This conflict was part of the South American theater in the Cold War, with the United States backing the Chilean military and the Soviet Union backing the guerrillas. The main armed resistance groups of the period were the Revolutionary Left Movement (MIR) and Frente Patriótico Manuel Rodríguez (FPMR), the armed wing of the Communist Party of Chile. These groups had a long-standing rivalry, including over Marxist orthodoxy and its implementation.

Key events during the armed resistance were the attempt to set up guerrilla camps around Neltume from 1970 to 1973 and from 1980 to 1981, the February 1986 sabotaging of the Limache train tracks, the Carrizal Bajo arms smuggling operation in August 1986 and the attempted killing of Pinochet in September that same year. After the return to democracy was initiated in 1990 the bulk of the armed groups demobilized. However, splinter groups that reportedly switched targets after the dictatorship fell, continued to carry out assassinations, bombings, kidnappings and armed robberies until 2010.

The insurgency was supported by Cuba, Libya, Nicaragua and North Korea (the Warsaw Pact states provided minor financial assistance), while the Chilean security forces were backed by the United States.

== Pre-dictatorship violence ==
The first major action by the MIR took place in September 1967 during violent clashes between MIR-led students from the University of Concepción and riot police. Carabineros were seeking to arrest those responsible for destroying a police vehicle, but students reorganized and kidnapped carabinier Héctor Gutiérrez Orellana. Chilean president Eduardo Nicanor Frei Montalva sought to defuse the situation through intermediaries and obtained the release of the policeman in exchange for dropping charges against students earlier arrested in the confrontations.

During 1968, the MIR presence continued to be felt in various universities with armed actions increasing in 1969 through multiple acts of vandalism, intimidation and physical assaults on conservative/right wing students and faculty members. On 1 May 1969, fifteen MIR activists armed with knives took over the Bio Bio radio station in Concepción and transmitted a special broadcast calling for the locals to take up arms and overthrow the government of Frei. On 2 May 1969, MIR activists operating in Concepción attacked the branches of National City Bank, the building of the La Patria newspaper and the offices of the Weigner Stein business.

In June 1969, the MIR kidnapped journalist Hernán Osses Santa María, Director of the Noticias de la Tarde in nearby Talcahuano (15.6 kilometres), in an effort to silence the in depth reporting on the leftist violence in Concepción. Police Investigations and Carabineros soon surrounded the University of Concepción and forced the students to release the newspaper director unharmed. A specially appointed judge was soon named and a criminal suit was filed with the Courts of Appeals of Concepción against the MIR and 13 of its identified leaders for breaking the Law of Interior Security of the State. The "fugitives from justice-list" consisted of Luciano Cruz, Miguel Enríquez, Marcello Ferrada de Noli, José Goñi (later Chile's ambassador to the U.S.), Nelson Gutiérrez, Aníbal Matamala, Bautista van Schouwen, Arturo Villabela and other five.

Consequently, the MIR had no option but to go largely underground and into hiding. In the ensuing police and military operations against the MIR, a guerrilla training camp is discovered in San José de Maipo (Guayacán) and another at Corral (Chaihuín). Nevertheless, MIR guerrillas continue to operate, and in Santiago alone carry out 12 armed robberies of banks and businesses between August 1969 and September 1970 to finance their operations.

The Revolutionary Left Movement (MIR) were absolved of criminal charges under an amnesty under the Popular Unity (Unidad Popular or UP) government of Allende and was allowed to operate again openly, encouraging and carrying out illegal expropriations of farms and businesses, and assaulting outspoken conservatives/rightist members of the public and security forces. According to police figures submitted to the Chilean senate, 1,458 farms were illegally occupied between November 1970 and December 1971. Starting in the southern provinces of Cautin and Malleco the MIR organized a series of armed takeovers or tomas working slowly northwards up into the provinces of Nuble and Linares and eventually Santiago.

In April 1971, Juan Millalonco, a member of Christian Democratic Youth, was shot dead in Aysén by socialist militants, and VOP guerrillas in Santiago killed 33-year-old Raúl Méndez Espinosa at his sweet shop for not paying protection money to the guerrillas targeting small businesses. That same month in the expropriation of land on the part of leftist militants and guerrillas, Rolando Matus is shot dead resisting the takeover of the Carén farm in Pucón, and Jorge Baraona and Domitila Palma died resisting the takeover of their farms in southern Chile. On 24 May 1971, VOP guerrillas in an armed robbery of a bank money transfer van shoot and mortally wound a carabinier (Corporal José Arnaldo Gutiérrez Urrutia) and wound two other accompanying Miramar supermarket employees.

In June 1971, VOP guerrillas killed Edmundo Perez Zujovic, a Christian Democrat and former interior minister. That same month, another marxist guerrilla (46-year-old Heriberto Salazar) of the VOP walked into police headquarters in Santiago with a sub-machinegun and kills three detectives (Gerardo Romero Infante, Heriberto Mario Marín and Carlos Pérez Bretti) before blowing himself up with dynamite, and a carabineer corporal (Jorge Cartes) is killed by MIR guerrillas in the MIR stronghold of Concepción. On 1 December 1971, 50,000-200,000 women took to the streets of Santiago to protest against Salvador Allende's UP government. Their peaceful march turned ugly when UP radicals attacked the women with rocks. However, their March of the Empty Pots and Pans signaled the beginning of a massive coordinated anti-Allende movement. To keep the memory afresh of the march, women in the middle-class and affluent suburbs of Santiago banged on pots every night for two hours for several months.

On 30 August 1972, carabineer corporal Exequiel Aroca Cuevas was killed in the city of Concepción, when socialist militants open fire on the bus he was travelling. On 27 February 1973, MIR guerrillas attacked the Llanquihue police station, shooting and wounding 10 carabineers. In March 1973, 16-year-old Germán Enrique González and 17-year-old Sergio Oscar Vergara, both members of the Christian Democrat Party were killed while resisting the takeover of the La Reina estate. On 2 April 1973, MIR guerrillas operating in Santiago shoot and kill a police detective, Gabriel Rodríguez Alcaíno. In May 1973, Mario Aguilar, a member of the Movimiento Patria y Libertad is gunned down by leftists in downtown Santiago. On 26 July Arturo Arya Peters, Allende’s naval aide was murdered by members of the rightwing organisation Fatherland and liberty. On 27 July 1973, a farmer and member of the Christian Democrat Party, Jorge Mena, is surrounded by leftists and clubbed to death in Osorno. The next day, another farmer, Juan Luis Urrutia, dies resisting the takeover of his land in Bulnes. On 30 July, MIR guerrillas kill Manuel Garrido, an employee of Paños Continental in a confrontation that also involved Brazilian militants. On 27 August 1973, Sergio Aliaga, while driving through a confrontation between anti-Allende striking truckers and leftist militants, was killed after being caught in the crossfire and shot in the throat. On 29 August 1973, a Mexican militant (Jorge Albino Sosa Gil) working in Chile, shoots and kills Second Lieutenant Héctor Lacrampette Calderón as the young army officer was waiting for a bus in the suburb of Providencia in Santiago. The next day, two farm workers (José Toribio Núñez and Celsa Fuentes) died of horrific burns after being caught in the bomb blast targeting the pipeline between Santiago and Concepción.

== September–December 1973 ==
After the coup, left-wing guerrilla organizations tried to recruit resistance fighters against the Pinochet regime. Some of them had commando-training, having belonged to the GAP (Grupo de Amigos Personales), they had previously served as bodyguards of President Allende. Many activists created resistance groups from refugees abroad. The Movimiento Juvenil Lautaro or Lautaro Youth Movement (MJL) was formed in December 1982 and the Communist Party of Chile set up an armed wing, which became in 1983 the FPMR (Frente Patriótico Manuel Rodríguez). The main guerrilla group, known as the MIR (Movimiento de Izquierda Revolucionaria), suffered heavy casualties in the coup's immediate aftermath, and most of its members fled the country. Andreas Pascal Allende, a nephew of President Allende led the MIR from 1974 to 1976, then made his way to Cuba. Nevertheless, in the first three months of military rule, the Chilean forces recorded 162 military deaths. It is claimed that a total of 756 servicemen and police are reported to have been killed or wounded in clashes with guerrillas in the 1970s. Among the killed and disappeared during the military regime were at least 663 Marxist MIR guerrillas. The MIR commander, Andrés Pascal Allende, has admitted that the Marxist guerrillas lost 1,500-2,000 fighters killed or disappeared. Several hundred other young men and women, sympathetic to the guerrillas, were detained and tortured and often killed. An unknown number among those involved in resistance operations may have confessed under torture, most likely among non-combatant supporters (ayudistas) in the role of couriers and other clandestine tasks. Nevertheless, MIR leadership declared in an official document of March 1975: "Almost all of our imprisoned comrades have had exemplary behavior in the face of torture and murder".

Further, nearly 700 civilians disappeared in the 1974–1977 period, after being detained by the Chilean military and police. Remnants of the MIR also joined Marxist guerrillas from the People's Revolutionary Army (Argentina) (Ejército Revolucionario del Pueblo or ERP) in Argentina in the protracted fight to control Tucumán Province. Some 30,000 former Chilean conscripts that served between 1973 and 1990, claiming to be suffering from post-traumatic stress after taking part in the cordon and search operations and night curfews, are currently seeking compensation from the Chilean government.

Fewer than 60 individuals died as a direct result of fighting on 11 September although the MIR and GAP continued to fight the following day. In all, 46 of Allende's elite guard (the GAP, Grupo de Amigos Personales) were killed, some of them in combat with the soldiers that took the Moneda. Allende's Cuban-trained guard would have had about 300 elite commando-trained GAP fighters at the time of the coup, but the use of brute military force, especially the use of Hawker Hunters fighter-bombers, may have handicapped many GAP fighters from further action. On the military side, there were 34 deaths: two army sergeants, three army corporals, four army privates, 2 navy lieutenants, 1 navy corporal, 4 naval cadets, 3 navy conscripts and 15 carabineros. Most of the carabineros were killed after two busloads of policemen were heavily engaged by armed leftists in the Pro-Allende shantytown of La Ligua. In mid-September, the Chilean military junta claimed its troops suffered another 16 dead and 100 injured by gunfire in mop-up operations against Allende supporters, and Pinochet warned, "sadly there are still some armed groups who insist on attacking, which means that the military rules of wartime apply to them." 22-year-old Corporal Hugo Yáñez Durán would be among the army fallen, killed on 15 September 1973 in a shootout with leftists students holding out in the grounds of the University of Chile.

On 23 October 1973, 23-year-old Army Corporal Benjamín Alfredo Jaramillo Ruz, who was serving with the Cazadores, became the first fatal casualty of the counterinsurgency operations in the mountainous area of Alquihue in Valdivia after being shot by a sniper. The Chilean Army suffered 12 killed in various clashes with MIR guerrillas and GAP fighters in October 1973. On 18 November 1974, guerrillas open fire on an army vehicle, killing Corporal Francisco Cifuentes Espinoza. On 17 November, MIR guerrillas shoot and kill army sergeant Waldo Morales Neal and private Clemente Santibáñez Vargas. On 7 November 1973, guerrillas open fire on an army truck in the suburb of La Florida in Santiago, killing private Agustín Correa Contreras. On 13 November, MIR guerrillas killed army corporal Juan Castro Vega. On 27 November, MIR guerrillas kill army corporal Ramón Madariaga Valdebenito. On 3 December 1973, MIR guerrillas kill two army corporals, Rodolfo Peña Tapia and Luis Collao Salas and a private, Julio Barahona Aranda. On 13 December 1973, guerrillas open fire and kill two army sergeants, Sergio Cañón Lermanda and Pedro Osorio Guerrero. On 15 December 1973, guerrillas shoot and kill army corporal Roberto Barra Martínez in the suburb of La Reina in Santiago. On 26 December 1973, guerrillas open fire on an army jeep, killing private José Luis Huerta Abarca. By the end of the year, the Chilean police would claim to have uncovered a huge arms cache, that included 5,000 HK-33 sub-machineguns and corresponding ammunition numbering in the millions and large quantities of 20-mm anti-tank gun shells.

== 1974–1979 ==
On 19 February 1975, four captured MIR commanders went on national television to urge their guerrillas to lay down their arms. According to them, the MIR leadership was in ruins: of the 52 commanders of the MIR, nine had been killed, 24 were prisoners, ten were in exile, one had been expelled from the group, and eight were still at large. On 18 November 1975, MIR guerrillas killed a 19-year-old army conscript (Private Hernán Patricio Salinas Calderón). On 24 February 1976, MIR guerrillas in a gunbattle with Chilean secret police, shot and killed a 41-year-old carabinero sergeant (Tulio Pereira Pereira). The Chilean secret police on this occasion were met with a hail of automatic weapons fire, killing a carabinero and a girl. On 28 April 1976, MIR guerrillas shot and killed a 29-year-old carabineros corporal (Bernardo Arturo Alcayaga Cerda) while he was walking home in the Santiago suburb of Pudahuel. On 16 October 1977, MIR guerrillas exploded 10 bombs in Santiago. In 1978 the MIR sought to reestablish a guerrilla front in southern Chile and launched Operation Return which involved clandestine entry, recruitment, bombings and bank robberies in Santiago that briefly shook the military regime. In February 1979 MIR guerrillas bombed the US-Chile Cultural Institute in Santiago, causing considerable damage. In 1979, about 40 bombings were blamed on MIR guerrillas. Several police, military and civilians caught in the crossfire and bomb blasts were killed in the renewed MIR attacks in the Chilean capital and at least 70 soldiers and policemen were wounded battling the marxist guerrillas.

== Neltume Guerrilla Front ==
In order to reinforce urban guerrilla warfare waged in the main cities, the MIR commanders in 1978 had set in motion Operación Retorno (Operation Return), ordering exiled militants back into Chile.

In 1980, a platoon of thirty well-equipped MIR combatants of the Toqui Lautaro Battalion infiltrated into the mountains of Neltume in southern Chile and reestablished a guerrilla front. The MIR spearhead was commanded by 30-year-old Miguel Cabrera Fernández (nom de guerre Paine), who along with 120-150 Chileans had completed their training for this operation in Czechoslovakia, Cuba and North Korea.

The Chilean Army moved against the guerrillas in Neltume in June 1981, in a massive operation spearheaded by the Chilean Para-Commandos (elite Black Berets) all under the command of Colonel Orlando Basauri, with support from 10 Puma and Lama helicopters. Flora Jaramillo had fed and attended three MIR guerrillas that had sought refuge in her house, and not wanting to be later accused of collaborating with the enemy had sent her 15-year-old son Juan Carlos Henríquez Jaramillo to warn the local police station. Carabineros soon surrounded her house and opened fire, killing all the guerrillas and destroying the house, but not before warning Mrs Jaramillo to get out. The Special Forces involved discovered the first guerrilla arms cache on 25 June killing Raúl Rodrigo Obregón Torres (nom de guerre Pablo) in the process, and four more store dumps were uncovered by the end of the first week in July. Another gun-battle took place on 28 June, but it took some time before Basauri's men could corner the guerrilla force. Nevertheless, seven MIR guerrillas were reported killed in an ambush in the third week of September, just after the 8th-anniversary of the 1973 military coup, but the survivors were able to escape and blend in with the local population. On 19 September 1981, Army Private Victor Manuel Nahuelpan Silva is killed during operations in Neltume. On 16 October 1981, Juan Angel Ojeda Aguayo (nom de guerre Pequeco) who had escaped the mountain fighting was caught and executed while resting at his parents' home. Miguel Cabrera Fernández was himself killed on 15 October 1981, in a clash with policemen at Choshuenco.

The Pinochet regime launched another counterinsurgency operation in August 1984 to wipe out the remaining guerrillas, concentrating in the areas around Concepción, Valdivia and Los Angeles, killing seven more MIR fighters and forcing the remainder to go into permanent hiding.

Some forty MIR fighters lost their lives between 1978 (when Operation Return was set in motion) and 1984 when the MIR insurgency was finally defeated in southern Chile. Another 41 supporting Mapuche that had earlier on taken part in the land and business takeovers under Salvador Allende were killed with 80 only spared after having been rounded up in and around Neltume and held for long periods in secret detention camps. Guillermina Reinante, had three brothers rounded up and forcibly disappeared up by soldiers from the 8th Tucapel Infantry Regiment in late 1973. When she enquired about their whereabouts a female military official informed her that they had been executed. According to the 2012 Chilean TV documentary Neltume 81 Reinante, the military had executed her brothers in revenge for taking part in the land expropriations.

== 1980–1989 ==
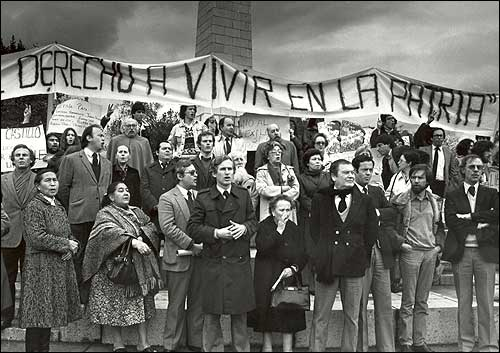
Peaceful protest against Pinochet, 1985

On 15 July 1980, three guerrillas in blue overalls and yellow hardhats ambushed the car of Lieutenant-Colonel Roger Vergara Campos, director of the Chilean Army Intelligence School, and killed him and wounded his driver in a barrage of bullets from AK-47 assault rifles. On 30 December 1980, MIR guerrillas kill two carabineer corporals, 31-year-old Washington Godoy Palma and 27-year-old Daniel Alberto Leiva González.

In a message sent to Santiago press agencies in February 1981 the MIR claimed to have carried out more than 100 attacks during 1980, among them the bombing of electricity pylons in Santiago and Valparaiso on 11 November which caused widespread blackouts, and bomb attacks on three banks in Santiago on 30 December in which one carabinero was killed and three people wounded. On 19 September 1981, Army Private Victor Manuel Nahuelpan Silva was killed during counter-insurgency operations in the Neltume area. In November 1981, MIR guerrillas killed three member of Police Investigations as they stood in front of the home of the chief minister of the presidential staff. In sweeps carried out from June to November 1981, security forces destroyed two MIR bases in the mountains of Neltume, seizing large caches of munitions and killing a number guerrillas. MIR guerrillas retaliated and carried out twenty-six bomb attacks during March and April 1983.

Leftist guerrillas, waiting in a yellow pick-up truck, ambushed on 30 August 1983 the governor of Santiago, retired Major-General Carol Urzua Ibáñez as he left his home, killing him and two of his bodyguards (army corporals Carlos Riveros Bequiarelli and José Domingo Aguayo Franco) in a hail of submachine-gun fire. In October and November 1983, MIR guerrillas bombed four US-associated targets. Guerrillas killed two policemen (carabinieri Francisco Javier Pérez Brito and sergeant Manuel Jesús Valenzuela Loyola) on 28 December 1983.

On 31 March 1984, a police bus in downtown Santiago was destroyed with a bomb, killing a carabinero and injuring at least 11. On 29 April 1984, MIR guerrillas exploded 11 bombs, derailing a subway train in Santiago and injuring 22 passengers, including seven children. On 5 September 1984, guerrillas shot and killed 27-year-old army lieutenant Julio Briones Rayo in Copiapó in northern Chile. On 2 November 1984, a bus carrying carabineros was attacked with a grenade during Chile's national cycling championship; four carabineros were killed. On 4 November 1984, five guerrillas riding in a van hurled bombs and fired automatic weapons at a suburban Santiago police station, killing two carabineros and wounded three more. On 7 December 1984, urban guerrillas killed a carabinero and bombed a subway station, wounding 6 people. On 25 March 1985, MIR guerrillas planted a bomb in Hotel Araucano in Concepcion that killed marine sergeant René Osvaldo Lara Arriagada and army sergeant Alejandro del Carmen Avendaño Sánchez, who were attempting to defuse the bomb. On 6 December 1985, a carabinero (Patricio Rodriguez Núñez) was shot to death by four guerrillas who opened fire on him with submachine-guns as he walked home. That same month, 15 city buses were destroyed with gasoline bombs and urban guerrillas hurled a bomb under an incoming train in Santiago, before making good their escape after a shootout with policemen. The total number of documented terrorist actions during 1984 and 1985 was 866.

On 5 February 1986, a car bomb destroyed a bus filled with riot police, mutilating 16 policemen. One carabinero (41-year-old Sergeant Luis Rival Valdés) later died of his wounds. The MIR claimed responsibility for the bombing. On 17 February 1986, two trains crashed in an area of Limache that had been reduced to one track after MIR guerrillas had destroyed a nearby bridge, killing 100 and wounding 500 civilians. On 26 February 1986, unidentified guerrillas or their sympathizers shoot and kill carabineer Lieutenant Alfonso Mauricio Rivera López. In May 1986 MIR guerrillas threw sulphuric acid into a bus, seriously injuring six people, including two children. On 25 July 1986, a bomb planted in a trash can exploded at a crowded bus stop a few yards from the presidential palace, wounding 36 people. On 6 August 1986, security forces discovered 80 tons of weapons at the tiny fishing harbor of Carrizal Bajo, smuggled into the country by the Manuel Rodríguez Patriotic Front (FPMR). The shipment of Carrizal Bajo included C-4 plastic explosives, 123 RPG-7 and 180 M72 LAW rocket launchers as well as 3,383 M-16 rifles. On 7 September 1986, about 30 FPMR guerrillas attempted to kill Pinochet. Pinochet narrowly escaped the assassination attempt on his motorcade, but five army corporals were killed and eleven soldiers and carabineros were wounded in the ambush. This failed operation led to an internal crisis of the group, many of its leading members being arrested by the security forces. On 28 October 1986, MIR guerrillas operating in Limache shot and wounded five policemen. One carabinero NCO (36-year-old Luis Serey Abarca) later died of his wounds. On 5 November 1986, guerrillas threw an incendiary bomb into a bus in Viña del Mar, seriously injuring three women (Rosa Rivera Fierro, Sonia Ramírez Salinas and Marta Sepúlveda Contreras). 37-year-old Rosa Rivera Fierro, later died of her wounds. On 28 November 1986, MIR guerrillas after having been stopped by a police vehicles, shot and killed 31-year-old carabinero Lieutenant Jaime Luis Sáenz Neira.

On 11 September 1987, a police vehicle was completely destroyed in a bomb attack in Santiago, killing two carabineros. On 20 January 1988, a bomb planted by MIR guerrillas in the Capredena Medical Center in Valparaiso killed a 64-year-old female pensioner (Berta Rosa Pardo Muñoz) and wounded 15 other women. On 26 January, MIR guerrillas planted a bomb in a house in La Cisterna that killed 42-year-old Major Julio Eladio Benimeli Ruz, commander of the carabineros special operations group. In June 1988, MIR guerrillas conducted a series of bombings in Santiago, at various banks. FPMR guerrillas that month killed 43-year-old Lieutenant-Colonel Miguel Eduardo Rojas Lobos of the Chilean Army, after he had parked his car in the Santiago suburb of San Joaquín. On 19 July 1988, leftists planted a bomb near a Church in Valparaíso, wounding three local churchgoers (Juan Salazar Olivares, Nelson Pérez and Luis Herrera) In October 1988, several platoons of the Frente Patriótico Manuel Rodríguez take over four important towns throughout the country, Aguas Grandes, La Mora, Los Queñes and Pichipellahuén. Considerable fighting takes place, before the Chilean military and police are able to recover the towns. Corporal Juvenal Sepúlveda Vargas is killed defending the Police Station in Los Queñes. On 10 July 1989, 26-year-old carabineros corporal Patricio Rubén Canihuante Astudillo was shot in the head at point-blank range as he guarded a building in Viña del Mar. In December 1989, Canadian police reported that 30 Brazilian business executives had been targeted for abduction by MIR guerrillas that included two Canadians, Christine Lamont and David Spencer who had joined the movement after meeting two exiled Chileans, Sergeo Olivares and Martin Urtubia, who came to Canada in 1978.

== Post-dictatorship violence ==
The election of a civilian government in Chile did not end guerrilla activities. Within a few months after President Patricio Aylwin's accession to power, leftist militants showed that they remained committed to armed struggle and were responsible for a number of terrorist incidents. On 10 May 1990, two guerrillas wearing school uniforms killed carabineros Colonel Luis Fontaine, a former head of the antiterrorist unit of the carabiniers, Chile's national police force. Two policemen were killed on 10 August 1990, in a working-class Santiago suburb and two more were injured in an attack on a bus. In September 1990, leftist militants detonate 53 bombs that kill or wound 83 Chileans. On 14 November 1990, gendarmes transferred Marco Ariel Antonioletti, a senior MJL leader from jail to a hospital for treatment. MJL guerrillas fought their way into the Sótero del Río Hospital but were forced to withdraw, after having killed four gendarmes and one carabinero. In retaliation, Chile's Investigations Police execute Antonioletti with a shot in the forehead. On 24 January 1991, MJL guerrillas ambushed and killed two carabineros. On 28 February 1991, a carabinero policeman died in a shoot-out in Santiago with leftist guerrillas of the Manuel Rodríguez Patriotic Front. On 1 April, FPMR guerrillas assassinated right-wing senator Jaime Guzman, killing him as he left a university campus in Santiago. On 9 September three guerrillas kidnapped Cristian Edwards, whose family run El Mercurio newspaper. After his family paid $1 million in ransom, the FPMR freed him. On 22 January 1992, two FPMR guerrillas (Fabián López Luque and Alex Muñoz Hoffman) were killed trying to rob a Prosegur cash delivery armoured van at the Pontifical Catholic University in Santiago.

On 11 September 1998, three police stations—La Pincoya, La Granja and La Victoria—were attacked with firearms, incendiary bombs and rocks and 36 were carabineros were wounded in violence related to the 25th anniversary commemorations of the military coup. In 2006, on the 33rd anniversary of the 11 September 1973, military coup, 79 carabineros were wounded in clashes with rioters. In September 2007, a carabinero policeman was killed after being shot in the face and around 40 were wounded during clashes with leftists marking the 34th anniversary of the military coup.

The following month, MJL guerrillas killed carabineer Luis Moyano Farías during the robbery of Banco Security in Santiago. In clashes with protesters commemorating the 35th anniversary of the military coup, 29 carabineros were wounded in September 2008. In September 2009, 19 Carabineros were wounded in clashes with protestors marking the 36th anniversary of the coup. The lootings and other forms of appropriation that took place in the aftermath of the devastating 2010 earthquake in Chile, were in part promoted and legitimated by the MIR movement.

== Unarmed resistance ==
A broad range of Chilean Resistance activities were initiated in this period by cultural, social and political organisations in opposition to the Pinochet regime, particularly by women. Among the publications from this movement are the Chilean Resistance Courier and Human Rights for Chile published by the Support Committee for Chilean Resistance.

The movement has further led to a number of works in various media.

== See also ==
- Dirty War
- Day of the Young Combatant
- Chile bombings from 2005
