= Galvarino Apablaza =

Chilean revolutionary (born 1950)

- Born: Galvarino Sergio Apablaza Guerra; November 9, 1950 (age 75); Santiago, Chile
- Military career
- Allegiance: Manuel Rodríguez Patriotic Front
- Service years: 1979–2001
- Rank: Commander-in-Chief
- Nickname: Comandante Salvador
- Conflicts: Nicaraguan Revolution

Galvarino Sergio Apablaza Guerra (born November 9, 1950), nicknamed "Comandante Salvador," is a Chilean Marxist guerrilla and former leader of the Manuel Rodríguez Patriotic Front (FPMR) (Spanish: Frente Patriótico Manuel Rodríguez), which opposed the military dictatorship of Augusto Pinochet. He has been charged in connection with several highly publicized kidnappings and assassinations, and as of 2026 is a fugitive from justice.

== Early life ==
Son of Galvarino Apablaza Orrego, an army non-commissioned officer who died in 1986, and Luisa Guerra Urrutia, he was the second-to-last of six siblings. While his older brothers were compelled to work during their secondary school years to help support the family, Galvarino was given the opportunity to attend university — making him the first and only member of his family to pursue higher education, a source of considerable family pride.

During his university years he developed his political consciousness, joining the Communist Youth in 1968. After his first year, he was elected as his faculty's representative to the Student Federation of Chile. Following the coup d'état of September 11, 1973, he was detained and passed through several detention centers, including Londres 38, the Estadio Chile, the Santiago Public Prison, the former Penitentiary, Tres Álamos, and Puchuncaví. On September 5, 1974, he was expelled from Chile to Panama along with 124 other Chileans as political exiles. For health reasons he subsequently relocated to Cuba, arriving on the island in December 1974, where he became known by the nickname "Compay."

== Membership in the FPMR ==
=== Early military training ===
After some time in Havana, Apablaza accepted his party's offer to enroll in what was described as "a new army to liberate Chile from fascism." He emerged as the natural leader of the Communist Party's nascent military detachment from the project's inception in 1975. A graduate of the Camilo Cienfuegos Military School, he achieved the rank of Commander — the highest rank in the party's military apparatus — specializing in artillery. From that point on he was known as "Comandante Salvador."

His elevation to the Central Committee of the Communist Party of Chile in 1978 signaled the party's full investment in his leadership for its armed project. His first major test as commander came in 1979, when the Chilean contingent traveled to Nicaragua to support the Sandinista National Liberation Front in its effort to overthrow the government of Anastasio Somoza Debayle. Following the Sandinista victory, Comandante Salvador was among the first to enter the bunker of the deposed dictator, leading a rebel group that arrived in Managua at dawn on July 20, 1979.

=== Leadership of the FPMR ===
He was the leader of the Marxist-Leninist group FPMR, founded in 1983 as the armed wing of the Communist Party of Chile (PCCh). Its mission was to carry out guerrilla attacks against the Chilean military dictatorship of Augusto Pinochet and it is named after Manuel Rodríguez, considered a hero of Chile's war of independence against Spain.

Among his key lieutenants were Raúl Pellegrin and Juan Gutiérrez Fischmann (known as "el Chele"), the latter of whom had strong ties to Cuban leadership, as his father-in-law was Raúl Castro, brother of Fidel Castro.

Apablaza returned clandestinely to Chile in early 1986 and integrated into the FPMR's political work, but after the discovery of the Carrizal Bajo arms shipment and the failure of the assassination attempt against Augusto Pinochet, he quickly returned to Cuba. He was not in the operational chain of command for either action.

After Raúl Pellegrin's death in October 1988, Apablaza assumed full command of the FPMR-Autonomous (FPMR-A), the most radical faction of the movement, which had separated from the Communist Party the previous year. He directed the FPMR-A alongside "el Chele" and Mauricio Hernández Norambuena ("Ramiro"). According to subsequent judicial investigations, it was within this leadership trio that the assassination of Senator Jaime Guzmán and the kidnapping of Cristián Edwards were planned — both occurring in 1991.

After the fall of Pinochet's regime and Chile's return to democracy in 1989, the FPMR broke into two factions: the FPMR Party, which renounced armed struggle, and the FPMR-Autonomous, which continued its armed campaign. Some of the FPMR's subsequent attacks included the explosion of a building housing offices of the American company Fluor Daniel (August 1994), an attempted bombing of a Kentucky Fried Chicken restaurant in Santiago (September 1993), an explosion near the Chinese Embassy in Santiago (May 1993), and a bombing of an LDS Church meetinghouse in Santiago (December 1992).

By the end of 2000, growing disagreements between Apablaza and other commanders who favored a more militarist line fractured the FPMR's leadership. In 2001, Apablaza publicly announced his departure from the organization in a letter to its membership, criticizing what he called an "operational mentality that seeks to defeat rather than to persuade," where "political effectiveness is associated with the operational character of the action and not with its thinking." Following his departure, he established a group called Identidad Rodriguista, through which he attempted to articulate his political ideas alongside former FPMR members.

Apablaza also participated in the kidnapping of Brazilian advertising executive Washington Olivetto in 2001, according to Brazilian police authorities.

== Criminal charges ==
He has been charged by Chilean judge Hugo Dolmestch with the following crimes: the kidnapping of Cristián Edwards (son of Agustín Edwards Eastman, owner of the newspaper El Mercurio) and the assassination of Senator Jaime Guzmán.

== Exile in Argentina ==
=== Arrest and extradition proceedings ===
At the request of Chilean justice authorities, an Interpol arrest warrant was issued against Apablaza in June 2004. On November 29, 2004, in a special operation by the Argentine police, he was arrested in the town of Moreno, Buenos Aires Province, where he had been living for several years under the false name "Héctor Daniel Mondaca" alongside his partner, Chilean journalist Paula Chahín — an employee in the Presidential Media Secretariat — and their three Argentine-born children.

He was held for seven months in the Anti-Terrorist Investigation Unit prison in Buenos Aires while his legal situation was resolved. On July 4, 2005, the presiding judge, Claudio Bonadío, denied Chile's extradition request, ruling that Apablaza's right to due process and to a defense had been compromised in Chile. He was released on bail of US$3,500 on July 5, 2005, with an explicit prohibition against leaving Moreno.

The Chilean government appealed the ruling to Argentina's Supreme Court, while Apablaza requested refugee status from the Argentine government, claiming political persecution in his home country.

=== Political asylum ===
In September 2010, the Supreme Court of Argentina authorized Apablaza's extradition, but indicated that the final decision would rest with the executive branch in light of Argentina's refugee protection law, which holds that "no refugee may be expelled, returned, or extradited to another state when there are well-founded reasons to believe that their right to life, liberty, and security of person would be in danger."

On September 30, 2010, the Argentine executive branch granted Apablaza political asylum following a meeting of CONARE, the National Commission for Refugees. The Argentine government transmitted a report to Chile justifying the decision, incorporating the Supreme Court ruling and a technical report from CONARE. On October 15, 2010, the Chilean government filed a motion before CONARE requesting review of the decision.

Apablaza's wife, Paula Chain, was a member of President Cristina Kirchner's press relations office at the Government House and regularly accompanied the Argentine president on international travel.

On December 5, 2017, the Argentine government revoked Apablaza's refugee status, reopening the possibility of extradition to Chile.

=== Extradition decree and flight ===
On February 14, 2026, after years of legal challenges by Apablaza's defense team, Argentine courts definitively confirmed the revocation of his political refugee status. Less than a month later, on March 9, Argentine President Javier Milei signed an extradition decree, with the knowledge of Chilean President Gabriel Boric's government.

Although initial reports indicated the transfer would be carried out within hours of Milei's signing, police arrived on April 1, 2026, at Apablaza's registered address in Moreno, Buenos Aires Province, only to find that he had fled. He is currently a fugitive from justice.
