= Mauricio Hernández Norambuena =

Chilean revolutionary (born 1958)

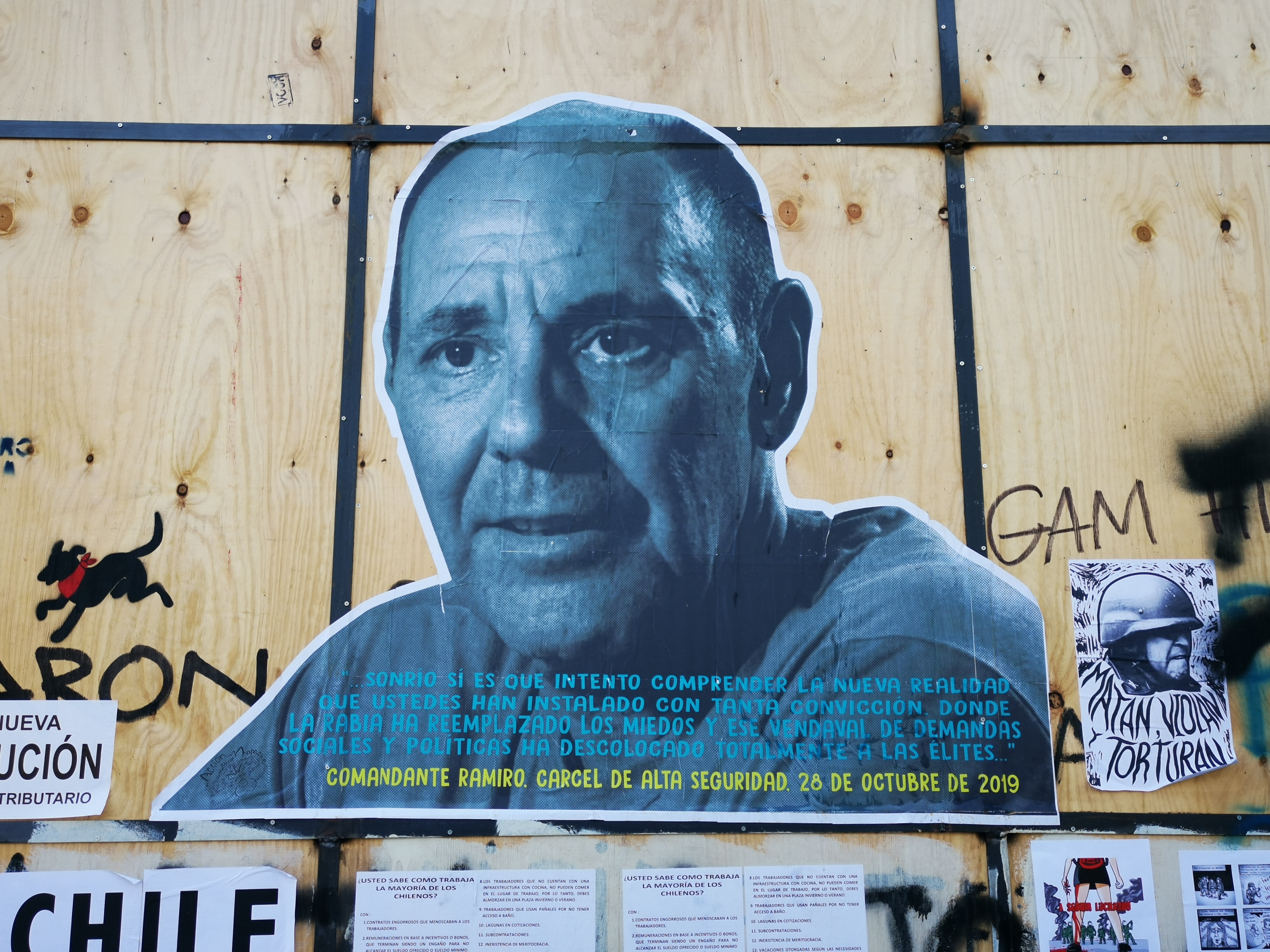
- Poster with the image of Mauricio Hernández Norambuena, outside of the Centro Cultural Gabriela Mistral during the 2019–20 Chilean Social Outbreak
- Born: 23 April 1958 (age 68); Valparaíso, Chile
- Military career
- Allegiance: Manuel Rodríguez Patriotic Front
- Nickname: Commander Ramiro
- Website: www.mauriciohernandeznorambuena.cl (in Spanish)

Mauricio Hernández Norambuena (born 23 April 1958) is a former guerrilla fighter and commander of the political-military organization Manuel Rodríguez Patriotic Front (Frente Patriótico Manuel Rodríguez, FPMR), where he was responsible for military and logistical planning and execution, becoming one of its main leaders. During his time in the FPMR, he acquired the nickname "Commander Ramiro" (Comandante Ramiro), by which he is still widely known today. Both the FPMR and Mauricio Hernández Norambuena were declared to be terrorists by the United States Department of State from 1997 until 1999.

== Biography ==
He was born into a socialist family, the son of marine biologist Moisés Hernández and lawyer Laura Norambuena. With all of his brothers being militants of the Communist Party of Chile, at the end of the 1970s he began to participate in street protests known as the National Protest Days (in Spanish, Jornadas de Protesta Nacional).

He graduated with a degree in Physical Education from the University of Chile in Valparaíso and joined the Communist Youth of Chile. In 1983, after being supported by the FPMR militant Cecilia Magni (Commander Tamara), he enlisted in the ranks of the Manuel Rodríguez Patriotic Front. With her, he traveled to Cuba to receive paramilitary training.

A direct participant in the most risky actions of the FPMR, in September 1986 he won the trust of Raúl Pellegrin's leadership by organizing one of the four groups of riflemen in the assassination attempt against Augusto Pinochet. His training and experience as a combatant led him to become one of the leaders of the organization.

He was considered one of the "tough" commanders; Although he had little political preparation, he had support within the FPMR for having emerged from the lower class. Hernández is often credited as the intellectual leader of the murder of Senator Jaime Guzmán, carried out in 1991, when the FPMR was arguing between either continuing armed operations or tactical withdrawal.

On 5 August 1993 he was arrested by the Investigations Police of Chile at a gas station in Curanilahue along with his bodyguard, Agdalín Valenzuela. Valenzuela would be executed two years later by his fellow FPMR militants after being accused of having turned in Hernández.

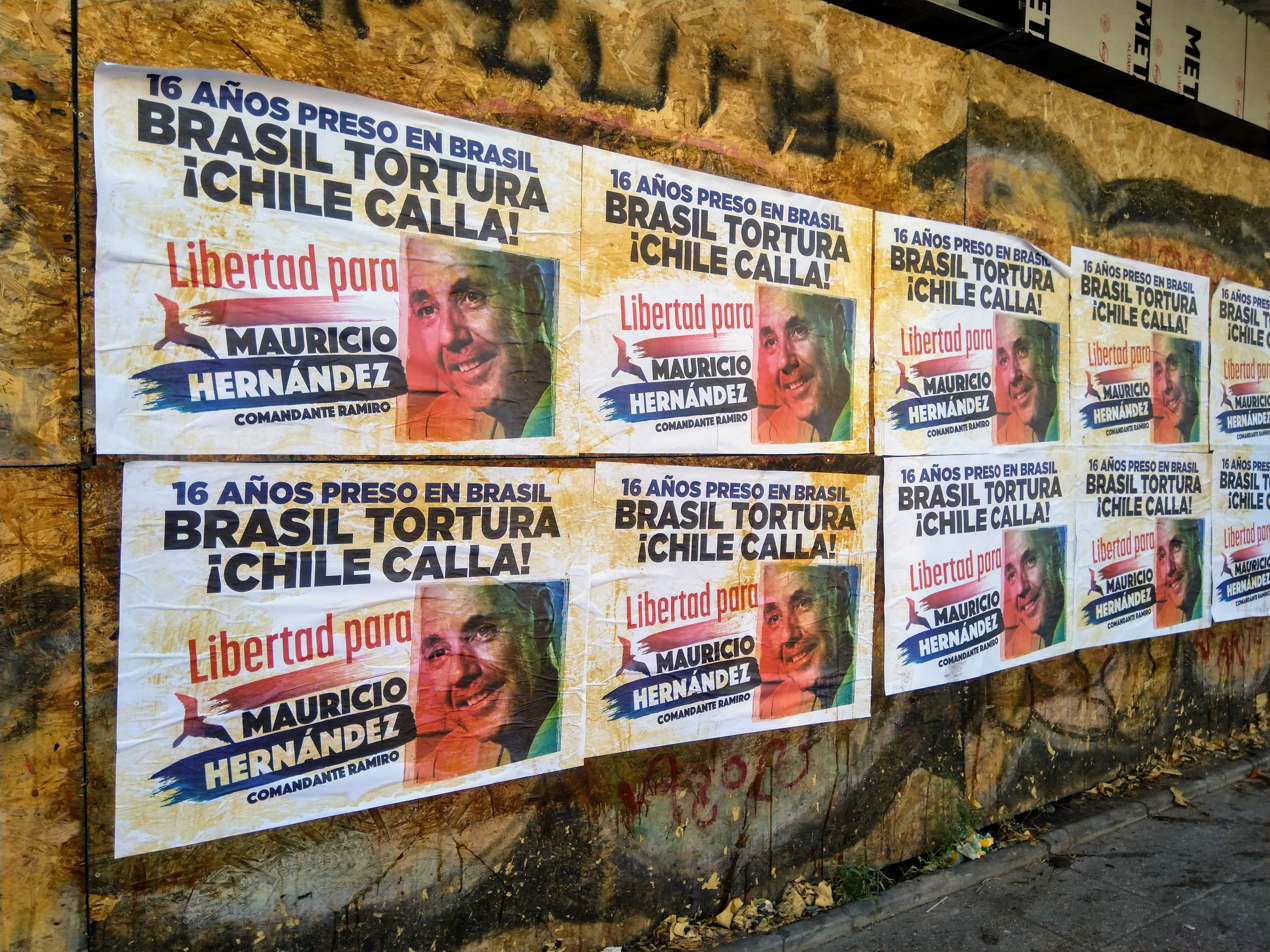
Posters asking for the liberty of Mauricio Hernández during his imprisonment in Brazil (2018).

Hernández was sentenced to double life imprisonment for his involvement in the murder of Senator Guzmán. He was also convicted of violation of the arms law, illicit association, terrorist conduct, falsification of documents and impersonation. He was also prosecuted for his participation in 1986 as a rifleman in the attack against Pinochet and in 1990 against the former commander in chief of the Chilean Air Force, Gustavo Leigh. He was also found guilty for the kidnapping of Carlos Carreño (colonel of the army) and Cristián Edwards (son of the owner of the pro-Pinochet Chilean newspaper El Mercurio), in an explosive attack at the National Stadium and in countless bank robberies.

After just over three years in prison, on 30 December 1996, Hernández, Ricardo Palma Salamanca, Pablo Muñoz Hoffman and Patricio Ortiz Montenegro were "rescued" in an armored basket dangled from a helicopter above the high security prison of Santiago where they were serving time. This operation would be known as the Flight of Justice (in Spanish, Vuelo de Justicia).

Investigators believe that Hernández fled to Cuba after the prison break. After disagreements with the government of Fidel Castro, he left Cuba in 1998. He then traveled to Nicaragua, El Salvador and, later on, to Colombia, where he joined the ELN and the FARC. Since they respected his military rank, he trained and came to have under his command a column of the guerrillas from that country. Later on, he migrated to Uruguay, Argentina, Mexico, and Brazil, settling permanently in the city of São Paulo.

On February 2, 2002, Hernández was arrested along with six other people in the town of Serra Negra after being accused of the kidnapping of the Brazilian businessman Washington Olivetto in 2001. He was convicted and held in the Federal Penitentiary of Mossoró, in the Maximum Security Penitentiary of Catanduva and the Maximum Security Penitentiary of Avaré in Brazil, where he served part of his 30-year sentence. A few days later, he gave an interview to the newspaper Estado de Sao Paulo in which he harshly criticized the conditions in which he was detained. During this entire period he was subjected to a prison regime called "differential disciplinary", which implied being confined in a 2x3 meter cell for 23 hours a day, with one hour spent in the yard alone, in addition to being locked up 24 hours a day on Saturday and Sunday.

He has been identified by journalists, scholars and members of the Brazilian public security apparatuses as the intellectual mentor of various terrorist attacks carried out in 2006 and the one who introduced terrorist practices, such as bomb attacks, bus fires and political assassinations, to Brazilian criminal groups.

On 19 August 2019, he was transferred from the Maximum Security Penitentiary of Avaré to the Federal Police of Brazil jail in São Paulo, due to the decision of the President of Brazil Jair Bolsonaro to accept the extradition request made by the Chilean justice, arriving in Chile the next day.

On 2 September 2019, Judge Mario Carroza sentenced him to two sentences of 15 years in prison, minus the 1,256 days that he spent in detention for the original sentence in Chile. Therefore, he must serve more than 26 years in prison.

Hernández's defense appealed, seeking to subtract the time he was imprisoned in Brazil for the kidnapping of businessman Washington Olivetto from his sentence. On 20 May 2020, the Chilean Supreme Court denied his appeal, ratifying the 26-year sentence imposed by the courts.

== In popular culture ==
In the 2012 mini-series To Love and to Die in Chile (in Spanish, Amar y Morir en Chile), he is played by Chilean actor Íñigo Urrutia.

The Chilean punk rock band Curasbun included a song about him, titled "Ramiro", in their 2016 album Inmortales (Immortals).

In the 2020 film Kill Pinochet (in Spanish, Matar a Pinochet), he is played by Chilean actor Cristián Carvajal.
