= Kill Pinochet =

2020 thriller drama film

- Theatrical release poster
- Spanish: Matar a Pinochet
- Directed by: Juan Ignacio Sabatini
- Written by: Juan Ignacio Sabatini; Enrique Videla; Pablo Paredes
- Starring: Daniela Ramírez; Cristián Carvajal; Juan Martín Gravina; Gastón Salgado; Julieta Zylberberg; Gabriel Cañas; Mario Horton; Luis Gnecco; Alejandro Goic
- Production companies: Villano; DDRio Estudio; Leyenda Cine; Potenza Producciones; Fusileros la película AIE
- Release dates: 12 November 2020 (Punto Play); 14 November 2020 (Huelva); 20 November 2020 (Spain)
- Countries: Chile; Argentina; Spain
- Language: Spanish

Kill Pinochet (Spanish: Matar a Pinochet, known early in the production stage as Los fusileros) is a 2020 thriller drama film co-written and directed by Juan Ignacio Sabatini, based on the attempted assassination of Augusto Pinochet in September 1986.

It follows the story of the Manuel Rodríguez Patriotic Front members as they develop a plan to kill the Chilean dictator in Cajón del Maipo in 1986, known as "Operación Siglo XX".

== Plot ==
The film is set in Chile during September 1986, a time when the country was enduring 13 years of dictatorship under Augusto Pinochet. Feeling exhausted by the situation, Ramiro and Tamara gather their somewhat inexperienced comrades-in-arms to plan an assassination attempt against the dictator. Tamara, who leads the guerrillas of the Manuel Rodríguez Patriotic Front, sees no other solution but to kill Pinochet. However, despite being so close to revolution, Tamara is unable to change the course of history due to espionage and betrayal.

== Cast ==
- Daniela Ramírez as Tamara.
- Cristián Carvajal as Ramiro.
- Juan Martín Gravina as Victoriano.
- Gastón Salgado as Sacha.
- Julieta Zylberberg as Silvia.
- Gabriel Cañas as Ernesto.
- Mario Horton
- Luis Gnecco
- Alejandro Goic

== Production ==
Kill Pinochet is Juan Ignacio Sabatini's debut as a director of a fiction feature film. He penned the screenplay alongside Enrique Videla and Pablo Paredes. A joint Chile–Argentina–Spain international co-production, Kill Pinochet was produced by Villano alongside DDRio Estudio, Leyenda Cine, Potenza Producciones and Fusileros la película AIE, in association with Primate Lab and with support from Fondo de Fomento Audiovisual, CORFO, INCAA, ICAA and Ibermedia. Shooting locations included Santiago and Valparaíso.

== Release ==
In the wake of the health situation of Chile caused by the COVID-19 pandemic, the film had an online pre-screening at the streaming platform Punto Play on 12 November 2020, with a streaming window at Punto Ticket scheduled to last until 6 December 2020. It also screened at the 46th Huelva Ibero-American Film Festival on 14 November 2020, and it was theatrically released in Spain on 20 November 2020.

== Awards and nominations ==
Year	Award	Category	Nominee(s)	Result	Ref.
2021	8th Platino Awards	Best Ibero-American Debut Film		Nominated	
2021	29th EnergaCamerimage Film Festival	Director's Debut Competition		Nominated	

== See also ==
- List of Spanish films of 2020
