= Gran Cañon Airport =

- IATA: none; ICAO: SCHU

Summary
- Airport type: Private
- Serves: Carrizal Bajo, Chile
- Elevation AMSL: 230 ft / 70 m
- Coordinates: 28°05′57″S 71°08′45″W

Map
- Location of Gran Cañon Airport in Chile

Runways
Direction	Length		Surface
Direction	m	ft	Surface
04/22	750	2,461	Dirt
- Source: Landings.com Google Maps GCM

Gran Cañon Airport Spanish: Aeropuerto de Gran Cañon, (ICAO: SCHU) is an airstrip serving Carrizal Bajo, a Pacific coastal village in the Atacama Region of Chile. Carrizal Bajo is 41 kilometres (25 mi) north of Huasco.

There is rising terrain east of the airstrip.

== See also ==
- Transport in Chile
- List of airports in Chile
