= José Carrasco Tapia =

José Humberto Carrasco Tapia (24 August 1943 – 8 September 1986) was a Chilean journalist known for his struggle against censorship during the military dictatorship era. He was a member of Revolutionary Left Movement. He worked as a journalist for various magazines, newspapers, radios and in television during the 1960s and 1970s. Among these were Punto Final, Gol y Gol and Análisis, the radios Minería, Portales y Chilena, and Canal 9 of the University of Chile. Additionally he was international editor of the magazine Análisis. His killing by the National Information Center on 8 September 1986 was in retaliation for the attempted assassination of Augusto Pinochet the day before.
