= La Oficina =

Chilean civilian intelligence organisation

Consejo Coordinador de Seguridad Pública, commonly known as La Oficina (lit. "The Office"), was a Chilean civilian intelligence organisation that operated from 1991 to 1993. It was created by the government of Patricio Aylwin on April 26, 1991, following the assassination of Jaime Guzmán on April 1 of the same year. La Oficina repressed violent left-wing organisations that posed a threat to the Chilean transition to democracy. The leadership of La Oficina was made up of politicians from the Socialist Party and the Christian Democratic Party. It has been accused that the organisation used methods similar to those used by the preceding military dictatorship of Pinochet including torture. La Oficina worked with a network of informants and promoted a culture of squealing in the targeted organisations. Informants connected to the targeted organizations were instructed to cease all forms of armed resistance, surrender their weapons, and hand up their fellow combatants. If they offered helpful information, they were also guaranteed regular work.

The groups targeted by La Oficina were:

- Frente Patriótico Manuel Rodríguez - Autónomo (FPMR-Autónomo), originally the paramilitary arm of the Communist Party, but by the 1990s an independent organisation.
- Movimiento Juvenil Lautaro (MJL or MAPU Lautaro), a splinter group of the Popular Unitary Action Movement that believed in insurrection against the military dictatorship and the civilian governments that succeeded it by seeking compromises.
- Movimiento de Izquierda Revolucionaria - Ejército Guerrillero de los Pobres - Patria Libre (MIR-EGP-PL).
