= Osvaldo Lira =

Chilean priest and theologian

Philosophical work
- Era: Contemporary philosophy
- School: Thomism
- Notable students: Jaime Guzman, Juan Antonio Widow
- Language: Spanish

José Luis Osvaldo Lira Pérez SS.CC. (February 11, 1904, in Santiago, Chile – December 20, 1996, in Santiago) was a Chilean priest, philosopher and theologian who wrote more than 10 books on topics related to the philosophy of St. Thomas Aquinas, as well as Ortega y Gasset and Juan Vázquez de Mella. He devoted most of his life to teaching in different universities, and had as many followers as opponents. With Ramón Callis in 1952 they founded the National Syndicalist Revolutionary Movement, with an open fascist tendency.

== Biography ==
=== Childhood and youth ===
José Luis Osvaldo Lira Pérez was born on February 11, 1904, in his maternal grandparents' house, at Catedral and Amunátegui streets (Catedral 1390), in Santiago. His parents were Luis Lira Luco and María Cristina Pérez Valdés, both devout Catholics. He was baptized on the day of his birth, in the parish of St. Anne. His ancestry includes one of the fundamental figures of Chilean history, José Miguel Carrera, Osvaldo's great-great-grandfather. His first studies were begun at home, where he learnt to read and write, and all the observant Catholic's background of prayers and devotions. Within his family he was always known as Luis or Lucho.

=== Education ===
In 1912, José Luis entered the Sacred Hearts School, where he stayed for eight years and was distinguished as the valedictorian. It was during his junior year, being 14 years old, when he felt a vocation to the priesthood. His father asked him to go to university before becoming a candidate for membership of the Congregation of the Sacred Hearts, so he studied engineering for one year, and law for another. On May 4, 1922, when he was 18 years old, he entered the novitiate of the congregation where he had been educated, leaving behind the names of José Luis, while keeping his third baptismal name, Osvaldo. In the scholasticate, novice Lira's professors were Fathers Adalberto Maury and Patricio Logan, who were key to his priestly formation. During the scholasticate, he was a teacher of Spanish and Cosmography in the Sacred Hearts School in Valparaíso. He was also a theology teacher for his own classmates in the novitiate, when Father Maury, the titular professor, had to leave and assigned him as his substitute. On December 16, 1928, six years after entering the novitiate, Osvaldo Lira was ordained as a priest, and celebrated his first Mass as such on December 25 of the same year.

=== Priest and professor ===
Father Osvaldo Lira began his teaching in the Congregation's schools in Valparaíso, Concepción and Santiago, settling down in the capital in 1934. During this period, he was able to deepen his knowledge of philosophy, metaphysics and dogmatic theology. He stood out for always teaching from the sources, without resorting to handbooks, but instead referring directly to the Holy Scriptures and St. Thomas Aquinas.

Living in Santiago, he met other great intellectuals of the time, with whom he shared his social and religious beliefs, as well as long talks and debates. Among these intellectuals were Julio Philippi and Jaime Eyzaguirre, and together they studied Catholic social teaching in depth. It was in these years that Fr. Lira wrote his first articles in the magazine Estudios, which was edited by Eyzaguirre.

Father Lira was known for having advanced thoughts as well as for using a vehement tone, which got him into trouble with his superiors in the congregation, adding to this the great popularity he had among his students, Gonzalo Ibáñez Santa María said that “no one who has ever met him has remained indifferent to him”. In 1939, eleven years after being ordained as a priest, during which time he had worked as a teacher for the Congregation of the Sacred Hearts, Fr. Lira thought it necessary to leave the congregation, considering entering the Benedictines or joining the secular diocesan clergy. It was monsignor Pío Fariña, auxiliary bishop for Santiago, who urged him to wait for better times. A year later, in 1940, it was decided that he should travel to Europe, where he met the General Superior of the Congregation. According to Julio Retamal Favereau, the influence of “some conservative leaders who branded Father Lira as advanced and even as a communist (!)”, was decisive. Retamal emphasizes that after this episode Father Lira never thought of retiring from the congregation, although he considered that they never encouraged, or showed any interest in, his intellectual action and production.

== Time in Spain ==
Father Osvaldo Lira traveled to Europe in 1940, arriving in Spain on May 15, after being in Belgium with his superiors before the country was invaded by the Germans. He lived in Spain for twelve years, from 1940 to 1952, residing in Miranda de Ebro and Madrid. It was in this country that he was able to complete his knowledge of Scholastic theology and Thomism. Lira had written articles for magazines and made translations of books by Catholic authors, but it was in Spain that he wrote his first books, the first one being about Vázquez de Mella, a Spanish politician whose socio-political ideals the priest shared: Nostalgia de Vázquez de Mella (1942). His other writings in Spain include Visión política de Quevedo (1948), La Vida en torno (1949) and Hispanidad y mestizaje (1952).

Living in Spain he met great writers and musicians, among the former Vicente Aleixandre, Dámaso Alonso and José María Pemán, and among the latter Joaquín Rodrigo, Ataúlfo Agenta and Joaquín Turina.

== Honours ==
In 1978 the Pontifical Catholic University of Chile appointed him Professor Emeritus of the Philosophy Faculty. In 1989 the same University awarded him the rank of Doctor Scientiae et Honoris Causa. University Adolfo Ibáñez named him Honorary Academician.

Professor Juan Antonio Widow, in the prologue to the second edition of La Vida en Torno, published in 2004 for the centenary of Lira's birth, wrote:

His written work is the tip of the iceberg that stands out of the water. His books and articles dealt with all the topics that he was passionate for, and the number is abundant. But his teaching was made primarily out loud. Y a fe que viva. Teacher in the Congregation´schools in Valparaíso, Concepción, Santiago, Miranda de Ebro and Madrid; in Santander's summer university, in Católica de Valparaíso and Católica de Chile in Santiago, where he was awarded the doctorate of Scientiae et honoris causa; brilliant speaker in many lecture halls and academies of Spain and Latin America. However, that voice was mostly heard in the conversations out of class or in the gatherings at his friends´ houses. These friends, many of them, were the students who had been conquered by the clear intelligence, by his honesty, by the passion with which he defended the truth and by the spontaneous and almost childlike affection he showed for his disciples and, in general, for the ones who, even in disagreement with him, kept their calm and their good humour in discussion; that is, who weren't tontos graves. Because the truth is that tontos graves would exasperate him and many times drove him mad.”

=== As to his thoughts ===
In the year 1994, University Adolfo Ibáñez together with Zig-Zag Publisher, released the book Padre Osvaldo Lira: En torno a su pensamiento. Homenaje en sus 90 años ("Father Osvaldo Lira: As to his thoughts. Tribute to his 90 years"). Just as the title indicates, the book was published as a homage to his 90 years (1904–1994). The articles talk about Fr. Osvaldo Lira's thoughts, and contain four biographical articles in his honor. The rest of the articles are about the following topics: Theology, spirituality, philosophy, morality, politics, law, history and regarding some poets. This is the largest work that has been done on the thought of Osvaldo Lira. The articles were written by 35 professors and friends: Julio Retamal Favereau, Rafael Gambra, Enrique Díaz Araujo, Alberto Boixados, Mario Soria, R.P. Raúl Sanchez Abelenda, Juan Roberto Pérez, Manuel Atria Ramírez, Guido Soaje Ramos, Féliz Adolfo Lamas, Juan Vallet de Goytisolo, Mirko Skarica, Juan Carlos Ossandón, Juan Antonio Widow, R.P. Carlos Miguel Buela, Patricio H. Randle, Antonio Millán-Puelles, R.P. Victorino Rodríguez, O.P., José Luis Widow, Luis Alberto Barnada, Miguel Ayuso, Gonzalo Larios, Alvaro Pezoa, R.P. Alfredo Sáenz, S.J., Carlos Francisco Cáceres, Alejandro Guzmán Brito, Gonzalo Ibáñez Santa María, Héctor Herrera Cajas, Edberto Oscar Acevedo, Juan Vicente Ugarte del Pino, José Joaquín Ugarte, Bernardino Bravo Lira, Cristián Garay Vera, Rubén Calderón Bouchet, Bernardino Montejano and Alberto Falcionelli.

== Bibliography ==
=== By Father Osvaldo Lira ===
- Nostalgia de Vázquez de Mella, Difusión Chilena [Colección Verbo], Santiago de Chile, 1942. 2nd ed., Editorial Andrés Bello, Santiago de Chile, 1979.
- Spanish version of Paul Glorieux, Cuerpo místico y apostolado: El dogma de la unidad cristiana expuesto à la juventud, Pax [Colección Vida, 11], San Sebastián, 1943.
- 'La belleza, noción trascendental', Revista de Ideas Estéticas (Madrid), 1945, nº 10, pp. 181–208.
- 'La monarquía de Quevedo', Revista de Estudios Políticos (Madrid), 1946, nº 27–28, pp. 1–46.
- Estudio preliminar a Dante Alighieri, Tratado de monarquía, Instituto de Estudios Políticos [Biblioteca española de escritores políticos], Madrid, 1947.
- 'Soloviev y la misión de Rusia', Estudios (Santiago de Chile), 1947, nº 169–170, págs. 3-28.
- Visión política de Quevedo, Seminario de Problemas Hispanoamericanos [Cuadernos de Monografías, 3], Madrid 1948, 286 pp.
- La vida en torno, ensayos, Revista de Occidente, Madrid, 1949. Compilation of previously published work: La Belleza, noción trascendental; La misión de Rusia según Soloviev; Introducción à la monarquía dantesca; Lirismo y Épica; Pensamiento y medida de Maritain; Visión de España. – Second edition, 2004, with a foreword by Juan Antonio Widow, Santiago de Chile, Ediciones Centro de Estudios Bicentenario, ISBN 956-8147-05-5
- 'La actitud política de Maritain', Cuadernos Hispanoamericanos (Madrid), 1949, nº 7, pp. 185–189.
- 'Aclaraciones sobre el carácter trascendental de la belleza', Revista de Filosofía del Instituto Luis Vives (Madrid), 1949, nº 30, pp. 479–493.
- Hispanidad y mestizaje, y otros ensayos, Cultura Hispánica [Colección hombres e ideas], Madrid 1952, 263 pp.
- 'El cristianismo de José Ortega y Gasset', Finis Terrae (Universidad Católica de Chile), 1954, nº 2, pp. 35–57.
- Ortega en su espíritu. I: Metafísica y estética, Pontificia Universidad Católica de Chile, Santiago de Chile, 1965.
- Ortega en su espíritu. II: Psicología, gnoseología, política, Pontificia Universidad Católica de Chile, Santiago de Chile, 1967.
- Poesía y mística en Juan Ramón Jiménez, Pontificia Universidad Católica de Chile [Ediciones del Centro de investigaciones estéticas], Santiago de Chile, 1969.
- 'Nación y nacionalismo', pp 19–66 in Enrique Campos Menéndez, Pensamiento Nacionalista, Gabriela Mistral, Santiago, 1974.
- El misterio de la poesía, Ediciones Nueva Universidad, Universidad Católica de Chile 1974–1981, 3 vols.
- Editor of El bien común, Segundas Jornadas de Derecho Natural, Ediciones Nueva Universidad, Universidad Católica de Chile, 1975.
- Verdad y libertad, Ediciones Nueva Universidad, Universidad Católica de Chile, 1977.
- De Santo Tomás a Velázquez, pasando por Lope de Vega, Academia Superior de Ciencias Pedagógicas de Santiago, Santiago de Chile, 1981.
- El orden político: ¿tradicionalismo? ¿fascismo? ¿democracia?, Editorial Covadonga, Santiago de Chile, 1985.
- Catolicismo y democracia, Corporación Estudios Nacionales, Santiago de Chile, 1988.
- El respeto de la persona humana: mito y realidad desde la Revolución Francesa, Corporación de Estudios de Formación Social, Santiago de Chile, 1989.
- Derechos Humanos. Mito y Realidad, Nuevo Extremo, Chile, 1993. ISBN 9567063168
- Entrevista: «Osvaldo Lira: El demonio está entre nosotros», en Vicente Parrini Roces, Matar al minotauro. Chile, ¿crisis moral o moral en crisis? Conversaciones con Antonio Bentué, Diamela Eltit, Humberto Giannini, Martin Hopenhayn, Osvaldo Lira, Editorial Planeta Chilena SA, Santiago de Chile, 1993. ISBN 956-247-089-X

=== Books about F. Osvaldo Lira ===
- Varios, Padre Osvaldo Lira: en torno a su pensamiento. Homenaje en sus 90 años, Universidad Adolfo Ibáñez, Editorial Zig-Zag, Santiago de Chile, 1994. ISBN 956-12-0960-8
- Cristian Garay Vera, 'La idea de Tradición en el P. Osvaldo Lira, SS.CC.', Verbo, marzo-abril, 1994.
- 'Escritos del Padre Osvaldo Lira en la Revista Estudios', Recopilación y estudio preliminar por Cristian Garay Vera, Instituto de Filosofía R.P. Osvaldo Lira SS.CC., Universidad Bernardo O’Higgins. Santiago, octubre, 1998.
- José Luis Widow Lira, 'Creación y ley en el pensamiento de Osvaldo Lira', Philosophica (Universidad Católica de Valparaiso), nº 19–20, 1997.
