= Jaime Guzmán =

Chilean politician (1946–1991)

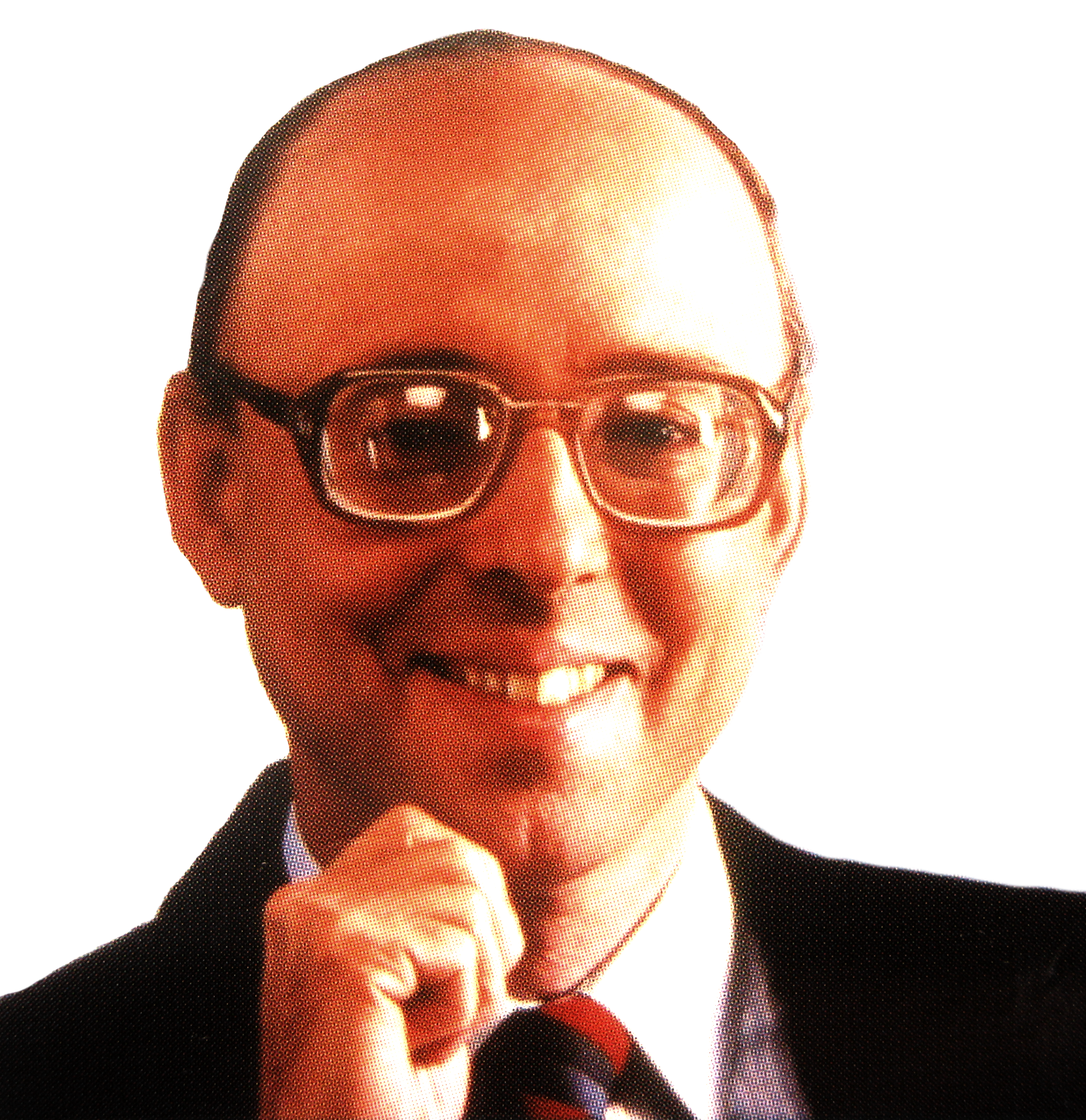

Senator for Santiago Poniente
- In office 11 March 1990 – 1 April 1991
- Preceded by: Creation of constituency
- Succeeded by: Miguel Otero Lathrop

Personal details
- Born: 28 June 1946 Santiago, Chile
- Died: 1 April 1991 (aged 44) Providencia, Chile
- Cause of death: Assassination by gunshots
- Party: Independent Democratic Union
- Education: Pontifical Catholic University of Chile
- Profession: Lawyer
- School of thought: Catholic social teaching; Gremialismo; Neoliberalism
- Era: 20th-century philosophy
- Region: Catholic
- Influences: Mella (disputed); Schmitt; Alessandri; Hayek; Oliveira; Eyzaguirre; Friedman; Novak; Kast; Lira
- Influenced: Pinochet; Arqueros

Jaime Jorge Guzmán Errázuriz (28 June 1946 – 1 April 1991) was a Chilean constitutional law professor, politician, and founding member of the conservative Independent Democratic Union party. In the 1960s, he strongly opposed the University Reform movement and became an active organizer of the Gremialist movement. Guzmán vehemently opposed President Salvador Allende and later became a trusted advisor of General Augusto Pinochet and his dictatorship. As a professor of Constitutional Law, Guzmán played a significant role in drafting the 1980 Chilean Constitution. He briefly served as a senator during the transition to democracy before being assassinated in 1991 by members of the communist urban guerrilla organization, the Manuel Rodríguez Patriotic Front (Autonomous).

== Early life ==
Jaime Jorge Guzmán Errázuriz was born on 28 June 1946 in Santiago, into a traditional family of the Santiago upper class. His father, Jorge Guzmán Reyes, was a sports director at the Catholic University, and his mother, Carmen Errázuriz Edwards, was a travel agent and a descendant of two of Chile's most prominent families, the Errázuriz and the Edwards. He had two sisters, Rosario and María Isabel, and spent much of his childhood in the company of his maternal grandfather, the conservative senator Maximiano Errázuriz Valdés.

Guzmán did not have a close relationship with his mother, who constantly reproached his father for his bohemian lifestyle; Guzmán was much closer to his father. He attended the Colegio de los Sagrados Corazones from 1951 to 1962, where he was considered an outstanding student who assisted at school masses. From an early age he received a strong religious education; the priest and professor Osvaldo Lira had a marked influence on his development. During his school years Guzmán served as president of the Literary Academy and demonstrated strong leadership qualities, graduating from secondary school at the age of 15.

After completing his schooling in 1962, Guzmán traveled to Europe and was particularly captivated by Francoist Spain. In letters to his mother he expressed admiration for Francisco Franco, José Antonio Primo de Rivera, and the Francoist soldiers who died during the Spanish Civil War. Of Franco, he wrote: "Francisco Franco cannot be classified as a dictator, since his coming to power is more than legitimized by a people who rose up in arms for God, for Spain, and for Franco."

Guzmán had initially considered becoming a priest, and later a philosophy professor, but under pressure from his mother he enrolled to study law at the Pontifical Catholic University of Chile in 1963. He graduated in 1968 with the highest honors and was awarded the Monseñor Carlos Casanueva prize for being the best student in his class, as well as the prize of the Institute of Criminal Sciences.

According to writer Óscar Contardo, Guzmán was identified as gay within a portfolio held by the National Intelligence Directorate.

== Political youth ==
=== Support for Jorge Alessandri and early political activism ===
At the age of 12, Guzmán participated in the political campaign of Jorge Alessandri, distributing propaganda. Guzmán acknowledged that he had a "close ideological and personal proximity with Jorge Alessandri," and added that "he was the person who influenced me most in my interest for politics. His presidential candidacy in 1958 and his presidency, between my 12 and 18 years, made me admire him as a superior man." Guzmán later met Alessandri personally in 1967 and established a close friendship, visiting him on weekends at his country estate in Malloco. He subsequently collaborated in Alessandri's 1970 presidential campaign as leader of the Juventud Alessandrista Independiente, the youth wing of the Movimiento Independiente Alessandrista.

=== Fiducia ===
From 1964, Guzmán became a frequent contributor to the magazine Fiducia, a conservative, reactionary publication inspired by the work of Plinio Corrêa de Oliveira. This movement had emerged in 1962 and in 1967 transformed into the Sociedad Chilena de Defensa de la Tradición, Familia y Propiedad (TFP). From this platform Guzmán published his political ideas and joined Fiducia in rejecting the agrarian reform projects proposed by the government of Eduardo Frei Montalva.

=== University Reform opposition and founding of the Gremialist Movement ===
In 1966, Guzmán was elected vice-president of the Student Council of the Law Faculty, and in 1967 became its president. He was thrust into prominence during the occupation of the central building of the Pontifical Catholic University of Chile on 11 August 1967, led by FEUC president Miguel Ángel Solar, who demanded the resignation of Rector Alfredo Silva Santiago and greater democratization of the university hierarchy. Guzmán led the resistance to the takeover, supporting the existing authority structure and criticizing the reformists for seeking to "politicize" the movement in favor of the Christian Democratic Party. Although he could not reverse the situation, he subsequently ran for the FEUC presidency, which allowed him to consolidate the Gremialist Movement throughout the entire university.

Guzmán founded the Movimiento Gremial in March 1967 in the School of Law, together with Hernán Larraín, Raúl Lecaros, Manuel Bezanilla, and others. In 1968, the movement won the presidency of the student union at the Catholic University and rapidly expanded to other major universities across Chile. The movement maintained almost uninterrupted leadership of the FEUC from 1969 to 1985. Guzmán defined Gremialismo as: "A current of thought that seeks to strengthen the autonomy of the intermediate bodies of the community — trade unions, guilds, business organizations, youth organizations, etc. — according to the principle of subsidiarity of the State, key to a truly free society."

== Role during Chile's dictatorship (1973–1990) ==
After the 1973 military coup, Guzmán became a trusted advisor to General Augusto Pinochet and an influential policymaker in Chile. Just two days after the coup, Guzmán was tasked with studying the creation of a new constitution. On 26 September 1973, the Ortúzar Commission was formed to draft a new constitution; Guzmán was appointed as legal adviser by General Gustavo Leigh. The commission included Enrique Ortúzar (president), Alejandro Silva Bascuñán, Jorge Alessandri, Alicia Romo, Juan de Dios Carmona, Sergio Diez, and Guzmán himself, among others.

Within the commission, Guzmán became the principal architect of the new Constitution, intervening on matters including the subsidiary state, abortion, the death penalty, and human rights. The commission held 417 sessions in which articles were drafted and revised. Following the plebiscite of 11 September 1980, the Constitution was approved with 67% of the vote, though the legitimacy of this vote has been questioned given the absence of electoral rolls, the non-existence of political parties, the lack of press freedom, and the systematic persecution of political opponents. The new Constitution entered into force on 11 March 1981, with full effect from 11 March 1990.

He was also a key participant in the drafting of Pinochet's Chacarillas speech of 1977, one of the founding texts of the military regime. While he initially had close contacts with Jorge Alessandri and espoused his political views, Guzmán eventually converted to the neoliberal economic policies supported by the Chicago Boys and distanced himself from Alessandri. He became closer to Pinochet and his minister Sergio Fernández.

Although Guzmán never held an official position in Pinochet's military dictatorship, he remained one of the closest collaborators, playing an important ideological role. He participated in the design of important speeches for Pinochet and provided frequent political and doctrinal advice and consultation. From the Gremialist Movement, Guzmán founded in 1975 the Frente Juvenil de Unidad Nacional and, in 1983, the Independent Democratic Union (UDI), of which he was president from 1983 to 1987. There he established the bases of social conservatism, the defense of the military dictatorship, neoliberalism, and the strategy for winning support in popular sectors. Between 1983 and 1989 he was a member of the advisory commission drafting the Organic Constitutional Laws, and consistently rejected any reform to the Constitution, however minor.

Guzmán declared that he had a "negative opinion" of National Intelligence Directorate director Manuel Contreras, which led to various "inconveniences and difficulties" for him. However, a secret 1976 DINA memorandum identified Guzmán as an intelligent and manipulative actor. The same document posited that Guzmán manipulated Pinochet and ultimately sought to displace him from power to lead his own government in collaboration with Jorge Alessandri. The DINA spied on Guzmán and monitored his everyday activities.

== Senator ==
After Chile's return to democracy, Guzmán ran for office in the 1989 legislative elections. Despite finishing third — far below the vote share of Ricardo Lagos — Lagos's list could not double Guzmán's tally, and Guzmán was elected to the Senate thanks to the binomial electoral system, representing the Santiago Poniente constituency with 17% of the vote (224,396 votes). He served from 11 March 1990 until his death on 1 April 1991.

In the Senate he was considered the most important figure in the opposition to the left, according to a March 1991 poll by the Centro de Estudios de la Realidad Contemporánea (CERC). He was among the most vocal critics of the new government, accusing it, among other things, of insufficient rigor in combating left-wing extremism. He strongly opposed a constitutional reform bill that would have permitted the president to pardon terrorists — a position that provoked the Manuel Rodríguez Patriotic Front.

Guzmán continued to work as a professor of constitutional law in the Faculty of Law at the Catholic University of Chile until his death. He was known for his extensive knowledge of Scholasticism.

== Death ==
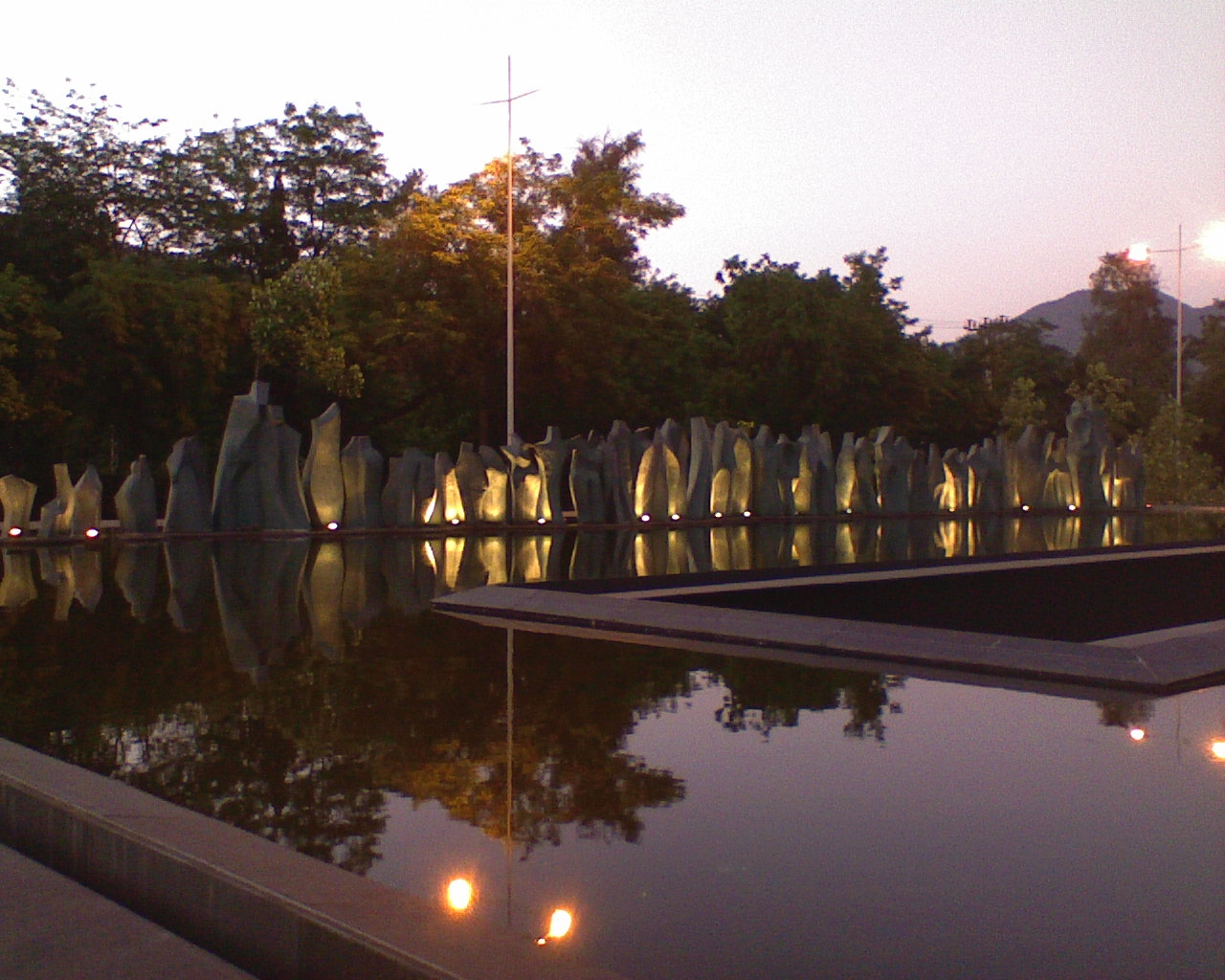
Monument in honor of Jaime Guzmán, located at the entrance of "Sanhattan" in Vitacura, Santiago, and inaugurated in 2008

On 1 April 1991, after finishing his constitutional law class at the Catholic University's Campus Oriente, Guzmán was awaited by his driver. At 6:27 p.m., at the corner of Batlle y Ordóñez and Regina Pacis avenues near the university exit, two gunmen opened fire on Guzmán, who was sitting in the front passenger seat of his car. His driver accelerated away from the shooting while the assailants continued firing. The driver took him first to UDI headquarters in search of help, then raced to the Military Hospital. Radio and national television quickly broadcast the news while family members, friends, colleagues, and supporters gathered at the hospital. Despite medical efforts, Guzmán died three hours after being shot, causing national shock.

The assassination was carried out by members of the far-left urban guerrilla movement Frente Patriótico Manuel Rodríguez - Autónomo (FPMR-Autónomo). The judicial investigation established that the material perpetrators were FPMR militants Ricardo Palma Salamanca and Raúl Escobar Poblete, while the intellectual authors were the movement's political-military leadership: Galvarino Apablaza, Mauricio Hernández Norambuena, and Juan Gutiérrez Fischmann. The operation had reportedly been planned since the late 1980s; the FPMR cited Guzmán's role as ideological architect of the military dictatorship as motivation.

Hernández Norambuena, also known as "Commander Ramiro," was the only one arrested and tried for Guzmán's murder. After serving less than three years in a Chilean prison, he escaped and sought refuge in Cuba. In 2002, Hernández was arrested in Brazil for the kidnapping of Brazilian businessman Washington Olivetto. He is currently serving a sentence in Chile.

The assassination of Guzmán led to the creation of the intelligence organization La Oficina by the Aylwin administration on 26 April 1991, to neutralize violent left-wing groups that had not accepted the premises of the Chilean transition to democracy.

Guzmán's sister and nephew postulate that Manuel Contreras and Pinochet had infiltrated the FPMR to induce the assassination. Under that theory, their motivation was Guzmán's alleged willingness to collaborate with Chilean justice to clarify human rights violations.

On 6 June 1993, Law 19,205 was promulgated authorizing the construction of two monuments in Guzmán's memory in the cities of Santiago and Valparaíso. A parliamentary commission chaired by Senator Carlos Bombal oversaw a public competition for the memorial design, attracting 140 projects.

== Political views ==
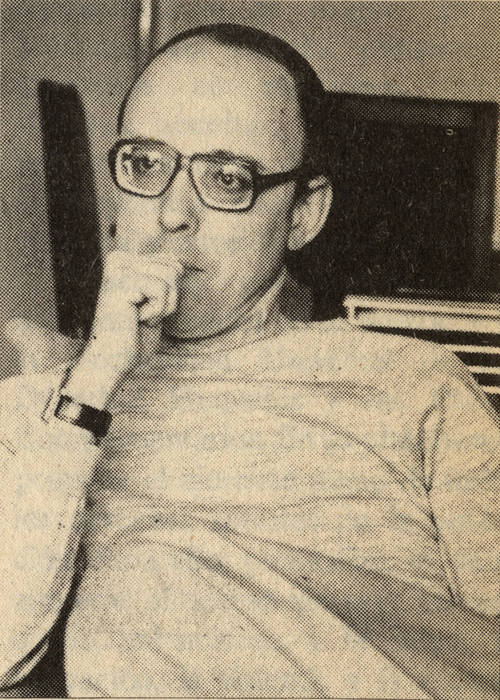
Jaime Guzmán

=== Gremialismo and subsidiarity ===
Guzmán's political philosophy centered on Gremialismo, a doctrine he founded that defended the autonomy of intermediate social organizations — universities, trade unions, guilds, and business and youth groups — according to the principle of subsidiarity of the state. He argued that such bodies should focus exclusively on their own sphere of activity and not intervene in broader political matters. In his Escritos personales, Guzmán declared: "When a student organization pronounces on mining policy or labor problems, or when a trade union commits itself for or against a particular structure of the National Congress, or when a professional association judges a national economic policy in its entirety, we are no longer in any borderline zone, but in a manifest overstepping of its field of action."

=== Constitutional thought ===
According to historian Renato Cristi, in drafting the Constitution of Chile, Guzmán based his work on the pouvoir constituant concept used by Carl Schmitt, a German intellectual associated with Nazism, as well as the ideas of market society advanced by Friedrich Hayek. This allowed Guzmán to create a framework for an authoritarian state with a free-market system. In areas where Guzmán was dissatisfied with Hayek's thought, he found meaning in the Spanish translation of The Spirit of Democratic Capitalism by Michael Novak.

=== Economic views ===
Around the time of the 1973 coup, Guzmán became familiar with the ideas of Milton Friedman and the Chicago School of Economics, through his contacts with Chicago Boys such as Miguel Kast. He eventually embraced neoliberal economic policies, distancing himself from the more nationalist economic outlook of Jorge Alessandri.

=== Social and moral views ===
Guzmán believed in the death penalty as what he described as "a very profound instrument of rehabilitation of the human soul." He firmly opposed the legalization of abortion in any form, which he viewed as unjustifiable homicide. On the subject he stated: "The mother must have the child even if it is born abnormal, was unwanted, is the product of rape, or if having it leads to her death. A person can never legitimately perform an abortion, because it is homicide, and all the negative or painful consequences constitute precisely what God has imposed on the human being."

A deeply religious man, Guzmán promoted ideas of "freedom of the spirit" against the "slavery of materialism." For scholars Claudio Arqueros and Carlos Frontaura, the principal forms of materialism Guzmán identified were Marxist collectivism and the individualism of consumer societies. His ethical principles were deeply concerned with the concepts of common good, family, marriage, tradition, and national identity.

There has been a dispute over whether or not Juan Vázquez de Mella influenced Guzmán's Gremialismo thought.

== Personal life ==
Guzmán was a devout Catholic: he attended Mass every day and received Communion daily. When traveling he would seek out the nearest church to attend Mass. He was closely acquainted with Chile's apostolic nuncio during the 1980s, Angelo Sodano.

He was a passionate supporter of Club Deportivo Universidad Católica and, through his father's connections as a club director, frequently attended matches and personally met notable figures such as journalist Julio Martínez and goalkeeper Sergio Livingstone. His personal interests included classical music, opera, literature, football, and the Viña del Mar International Song Festival.

Guzmán lived austerely in a modest apartment in Plaza Las Lilas, sharing it with his housekeeper, Violeta Chaparro. He regularly received visits from Catholic University students and Gremialist members, where political, social, and religious matters were discussed. He had a hypochondriac personality and, according to historian Cristián Gazmuri, consumed large quantities of anxiolytic and sleep-inducing medications.

== Controversies ==
=== Human rights ===
Guzmán's participation in the military dictatorship is the subject of major controversy, particularly regarding his knowledge of the human rights violations committed during that period, as evidenced in judicial documents. In his own words: "The civilians who were in the government realized that the military regime was a wild and runaway horse that needed to be reined in, so that it would not commit more human rights violations. (...) When we found out that there would be an execution or a disappearance we tried to prevent it, and in many cases we succeeded."

According to lawyer Nelson Caucoto, the gravity of this admission lies in the fact that, knowing such abuses were occurring — or about to occur — those involved did not report them to the courts, even as those courts were hearing habeas corpus petitions and denunciations of kidnapping filed on behalf of hundreds of Chileans who subsequently disappeared forever. Roberto Thieme, one of the founders of Patria y Libertad, has described Guzmán as one of the intellectual architects of the human rights violations that occurred during the dictatorship.

=== Colonia Dignidad ===
In June 2005, following the arrest of German Lutheran preacher Paul Schäfer and the evacuation of Colonia Dignidad, visitor records were discovered listing Guzmán among those who had accessed the restricted compound, alongside Andrés Chadwick, Hernán Larraín, and Carlos Bombal, among other politicians and religious entities.

Former justice minister Mónica Madariaga stated in an interview that Guzmán gave classes inside Villa Baviera (Colonia Dignidad) to young UDI leaders including Pablo Longueira and Andrés Chadwick: "Jaime Guzmán gave classes to Pablo Longueira, Luis Cordero and Andrés Chadwick inside Colonia Dignidad. [...] They were indoctrinated there; they were given classes. Jaime Guzmán instructed them in a Platonic style, walking through the fields while giving lectures. They all derived great benefit from Colonia Dignidad."

=== Cooperativa La Familia ===
At the beginning of 1977, judge Sergio Dunlop issued a travel restriction order against Guzmán during investigations into the financial scandal of the Cooperativa La Familia — founded by Gremialist leaders in 1975 — which was reversed 24 hours later.
