= Carrizal Bajo =

Village in Atacama Region, Chile

Coordinates: 28°05′S 71°09′W

Carrizal Bajo is a harbour and village in Atacama Region, Chile, located about 40 km north of the city of Huasco. Between May and August 1986 the Manuel Rodríguez Patriotic Front, the armed wing of the Communist Party of Chile, used the port to smuggle in weapons from Cuban ships anchored offshore. This was the largest weapon smuggle move during the whole military dictatorship period (1973–1990) in Chile and while most of the weapons were discovered by authorities some were moved to other parts of the country and came notably to be used in the 1986 assassination attempt on Augusto Pinochet. The weapons interned were US weapons obtained by Cuba from Vietnam.

== Transportation ==
The city is served by Gran Cañon Airport, which has no commercial airline service.
