= Attempted assassination of Augusto Pinochet =

1986 event in Chile

Coordinates: 33°35′17″S 70°28′49″W

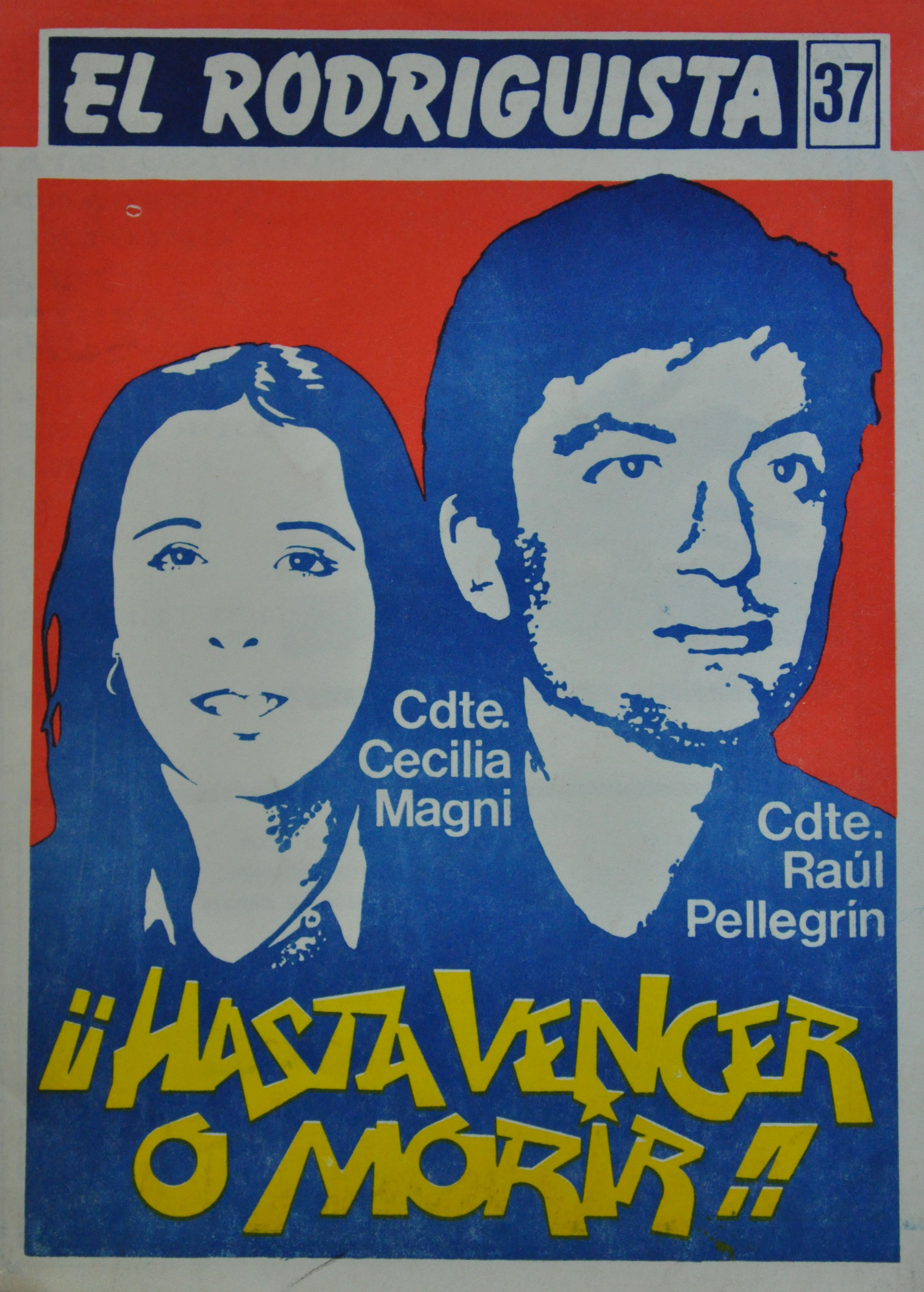
- Raúl Pellegrin and Cecilia Magni on the November 1988 cover of El Rodriguista, published by FPMR the month after their deaths. Both Pellegrin and Magni participated in the assassination attempt.
- Location: Cajón del Maipo, Chile
- Date: 7 September 1986
- Target: Augusto Pinochet (President of Chile)
- Attack type: Assassination attempt
- Weapons: Rifles, grenade launchers
- Deaths: 5
- Injuries: 12 (including Pinochet)
- Perpetrator: Manuel Rodríguez Patriotic Front
- Motive: Military dictatorship in Chile

An assassination attempt was made on Chilean dictator Augusto Pinochet the evening of 7 September 1986, when members of the urban guerrilla group Manuel Rodríguez Patriotic Front (Spanish: Frente Patriótico Manuel Rodríguez, FPMR) ambushed a motorcade carrying Pinochet to the capital, Santiago.

== Planning ==
The FPMR considered 1986 to be the decisive year in their struggle against Pinochet. The guerrillas termed the assault Operation 20th Century (Spanish: Operación Siglo XX).

According to Patricio Manns, the attack was partially planned in Switzerland and at his house in Paris, where he lived in exile. Bulletproof vests for the operation were reportedly donated by conscripts in Sweden and Switzerland.

The location of the attack, Cuesta de Las Achupallas, was carefully selected by the guerillas. Cuesta de Las Achupallas is a bottleneck road along mountainous terrain between Santiago and El Melocoton, Pinochet's country estate 30 miles southeast of Santiago in Cajón del Maipo. The guerrillas rented a house in the vicinity, posing as seminary students where they hid for five days prior to the attack and reportedly were given training by an army officer.

The death of former President Jorge Alessandri on August 31 influenced events by requiring Pinochet to travel back to Santiago, which changed the schedule of the attack.

== Ambush ==
Pinochet was riding in an armored Mercedes, fourth in a five-car caravan. At 18:35, members of the FPMR driving a car pulling a camping trailer swerved in front of the motorcade, blocking the road as the guerrillas opened fire. "Intense firing began," Pinochet later recalled, "with machine guns, rifles and bazookas or possibly rocket launchers and some hand grenades." The fusillade came from all sides, cutting down the police motorcycle escort as the second car in the convoy exploded from a rocket attack. The guerrillas had 17 rifles; 16 of them automatic M16 rifles. They also had 10 M72 LAW rocket-propelled grenade launchers, one submachine gun, and an "unknown number" of homemade grenades.

Quick thinking by Pinochet's driver likely saved the general as the driver immediately reversed the car out of the line of fire, turned around, and sped back to El Melocoton to radio for reinforcements as the local mountainous geography prevented Pinochet's guards from using radio communication with nearby military and police units. The car would later be displayed in Santiago indicating 38 bullet hits, none of which pierced the armor-plating.

Pinochet only suffered minor cuts to his hand from flying debris, however five of his bodyguards were killed and eleven others injured. The guerrillas, estimated to number around 25 escaped down the canyon in vehicles with red lights and sirens so reinforcements coming up the hill thought they were also part of the security forces.

== Aftermath ==
The assassination attempt triggered a wave of repression against dissidents of the dictatorship. Opposition figures unrelated to the events, such as Ricardo Lagos, Patricio Hales, and Germán Correa, were arrested, and journalist José Carrasco, who was already in custody, was killed. The failure of Pinochet's attempted assassination led to an internal crisis in the Manuel Rodríguez Patriotic Front, resulting in splits and the complete autonomy of the group from the Communist Party by 1987. The attackers faced different fates, but many were hunted down either in October 1986 or in the years leading up to the Chilean transition to democracy in 1990. José Joaquín Valenzuela, who was the "operative leader" of the attack, was extrajudicially killed in Operación Albania. Some of the people involved in the attack ended up in prison from which they escaped through a tunnel in 1990.

== See also ==
- Assassination of Carlos Prats
- Assassination of Jaime Guzmán
- Assassination of Orlando Letelier
- Attempted assassination of Bernardo Leighton
- Death of Eduardo Frei Montalva
