= Raúl Pellegrin =

Chilean Marxist guerrilla leader

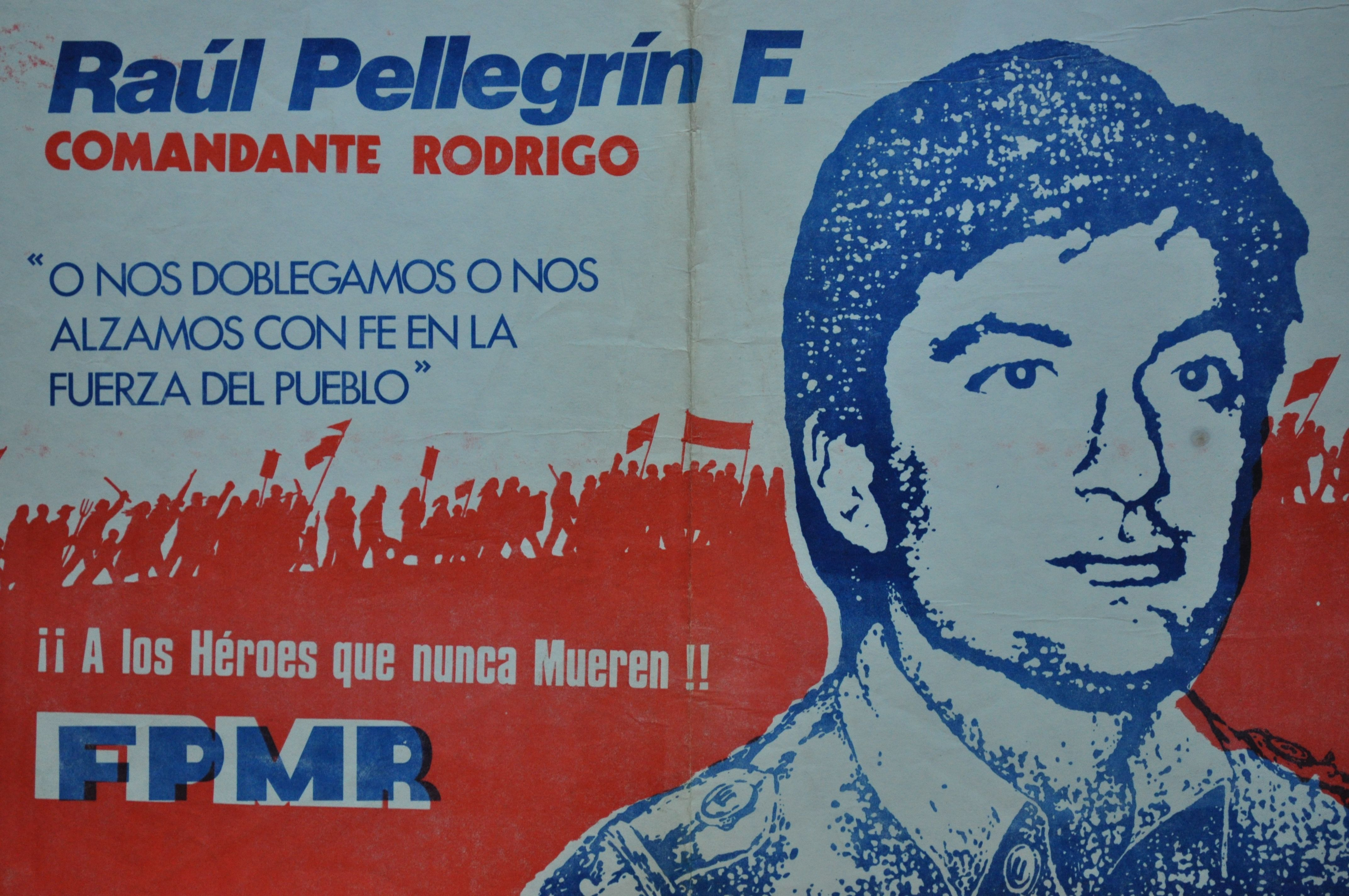
- Raúl Pellegrin
- Born: 28 October 1958; Santiago, Chile
- Died: 30 October 1988 (aged 30)
- Military career
- Allegiance: FPMR
- Service years: 1976–1988
- Rank: Commander-in-Chief
- Nicknames: Comandante José Miguel; Rodrigo
- Conflicts: Nicaraguan Revolution; Armed resistance in Chile; Attempted assassination of Augusto Pinochet

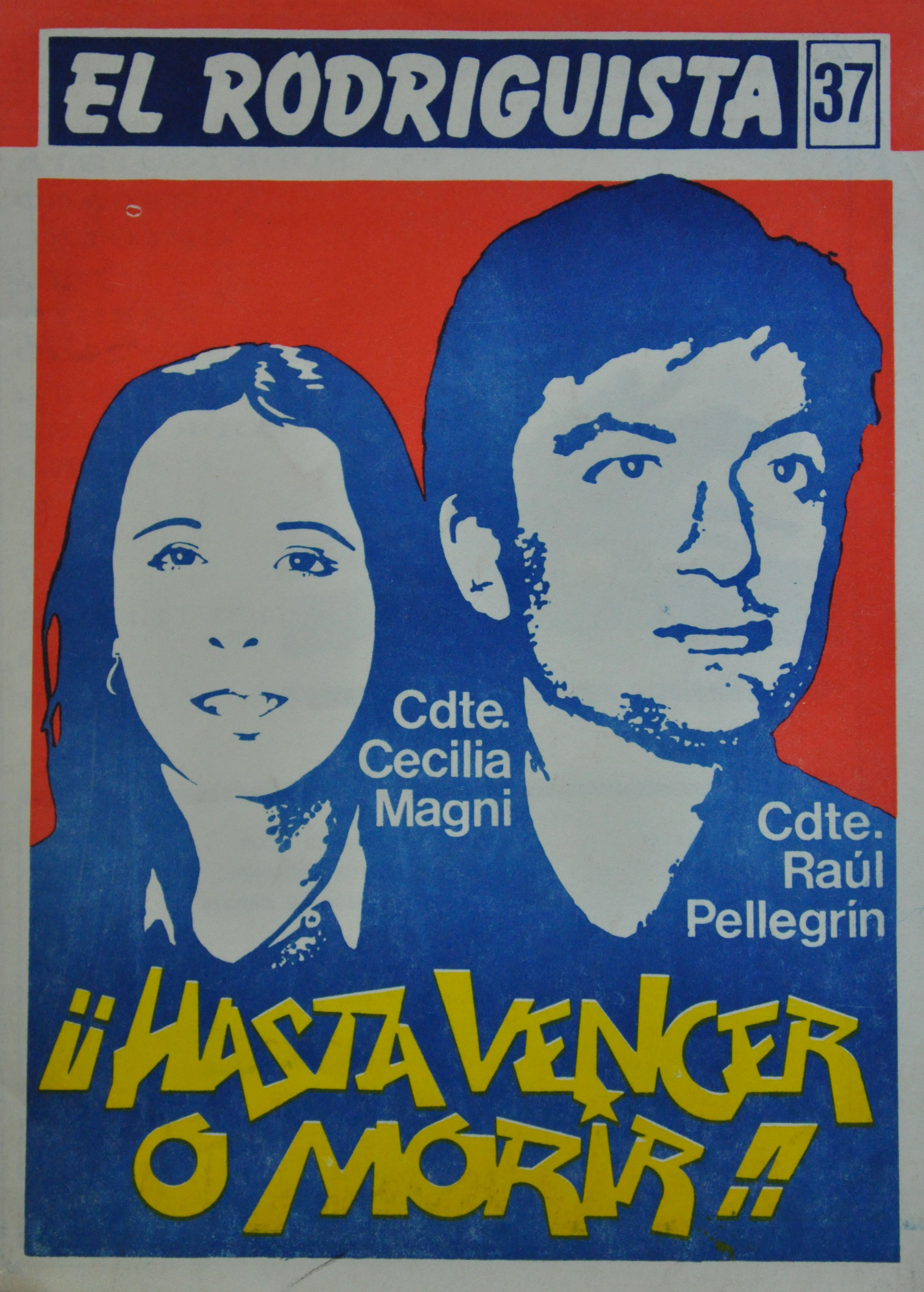
Raúl Pellegrin and Cecilia Magni

Raúl Alejandro Pellegrin Friedmann (28 October 1958 – 30 October 1988) was a Chilean guerrilla leader. He was the founder and main leader of the Manuel Rodríguez Patriotic Front, in which he was well known as "Comandante José Miguel", "Rodrigo" or "Benjamín".

== Early life ==
He was born to Raúl Pellegrin Arias (of French descent) and Judith "Tita" Friedmann Volosky (of Russian-Jewish descent).

== Career ==
In 1976, his family moved to Cuba where he pursued a career in medicine, but a few months later, he decided to leave college to take up a military career, joining the school Camilo Cienfuegos which is dependent on Cuba's Revolutionary Armed Forces (FAR). Over there, he lived with nearly one hundred Chilean military personnel under the support of the government of Fidel Castro. From that school, Pellegrin graduated in late 1978 with the rank of lieutenant.

In early 1979, he decided to travel to Nicaragua to support the struggle of the Sandinista National Liberation Front (FSLN), which sought to overthrow President Anastasio Somoza Debayle.

== Death ==
Pellegrin was found dead on 30 October 1988, at age 30. His body was found floating in the Tinguiririca River.
