= Manuel Rodríguez Patriotic Front =

Chilean revolutionary and guerrilla organisation

- Official and historical flag of the Manuel Rodríguez Patriotic Front (FPMR)
- Leaders: Raúl Pellegrin (Comandante José Miguel or Rodrigo), (1983–1988) (executed); Galvarino Apablaza (Comandante Salvador), (1988–2001)
- Dates active: 14 December 1983 – 1999
- Active regions: Chile
- Ideology: Communism; Marxism-Leninism; Guevarism; Foco theory; Socialist patriotism; Rodriguismo; Revolutionary socialism
- Political position: Far-left
- Size: 1,500–4,000 militants (1986)
- Part of: Communist Party of Chile (until 1987)
- Wars: Armed resistance in Chile (1973-1990)

The Manuel Rodríguez Patriotic Front (in Spanish: Frente Patriótico Manuel Rodríguez, FPMR) was a Marxist-Leninist guerrilla organisation officially founded on 14 December 1983 as the military wing of the Communist Party of Chile in the context of this party policy denominated as the "Política de Rebelión Popular de Masas", created with the goal of a violent overthrow of the civic-military dictatorship of General Augusto Pinochet.

It was described as a terrorist organization by the US Department of State and by MI6 until 1999, when the FPMR ceased its armed activity, 9 years after the end of the Pinochet transfer of power.

The FPMR was estimated to be made up of 1,500 to 4,000 militants and combatants.

== Name ==
The organization is named after Manuel Rodríguez Erdoiza, a hero of the Chilean War of Independence considered one of the founding fathers of independent Chile.

== Activity during the military dictatorship (1983–90) ==
On 7 September 1986, after months of planning, the FPMR attacked dictator Augusto Pinochet's car in an assassination attempt. Five of Pinochet's bodyguards were killed and eleven wounded. Pinochet, however, only suffered minor injuries. He was riding the car with his then 10-year-old grandson who survived unharmed. Also in 1986, Chilean security forces caught the FPMR smuggling an 80-ton shipment of weapons in Carrizal Bajo, including C-4 plastic explosives, RPG-7 and M72 LAW rocket launchers as well as more than three thousand M-16 rifles.

The failure of Pinochet's attempted assassination led to an internal crisis in the FPMR, leading to splits and to the group's complete autonomy towards the PCCh.

On 8 April 1986, FPMR guerrillas kidnapped and held the Carabinero corporal Germán Obando captive for 48 hours. After nationwide coverage of the incident, the press reported mass condemnation which included political groups normally sympathetic to the cause of the FPMR.

On 13 April 1987, the FPMR simultaneously assaulted the offices of Associated Press (AP) and eight radio stations in Santiago, killing an off-duty security guard.

In the period 1988–1994, the FPMR conducted 15 attacks against LDS Chapels and temples.

On 5 November 1990, FPMR guerrillas detonated a bomb inside the restaurant Max und Moritz in a seaside resort of Viña del Mar, wounding three sailors from the United States aircraft carrier USS Abraham Lincoln. Three British tourists and two waitresses were also injured in the attack.

== Activity during the democratic transition (1990–99) ==
After the restoration of democratic rule in Chile in 1990, main FPMR targets included LDS Chapels and temples, the kidnapping of Cristian Edwards, son of the owner of the nation's most prominent newspaper, El Mercurio, and US businesses in Chile such as McDonald's and Kentucky Fried Chicken restaurants.

On 1 April 1991, Senator and close Pinochet advisor Jaime Guzmán was shot at the exit of the Pontifical Catholic University of Chile where he was a professor of constitutional law. He was driven to a nearby hospital by his driver but died three hours later from several bullet wounds. His assassination was executed by FPMR members Ricardo Palma Salamanca and Raúl Escobar Poblete; the operation is believed to have been planned by the leaders of the movement Galvarino Apablaza, Mauricio Hernández Norambuena and Juan Gutiérrez Fischmann, who had been planning the murder of Guzman since the 1980s.

In 1993, FPMR guerrillas bombed two McDonald's restaurants and attempted to bomb a Kentucky Fried Chicken restaurant.

In 2005 FPMR member Patricio Ortiz received political asylum in Switzerland. He was sentenced in Chile to ten years of prison for the assassination of a police officer in 1991, during the beginning of the transition to democracy. Ortiz escaped from a Chilean prison in 1996 and reached Switzerland the following year. Following an extradition request by Chile, he was detained by Swiss authorities, who later refused to extradite him as his physical integrity could not be assured (i.e., possibility of torture: extraditing him would have violated article 3 of the European Convention of Human Rights). Swiss authorities then freed him and granted him asylum. In 2007 the Socialist President Michelle Bachelet, who had been herself tortured by the army, criticized the political asylum given to Ortiz, to indignation of the Chilean Left.

== Extradition proceedings ==
On 13 September 2011, judge Mario Carroza from Santiago's Court of Appeals, requested the Chilean Supreme Court the extradition from Belgium of former FPMR guerrilla Miguel Ángel Peña, accused of UDI's Senator Jaime Guzmán's murder that took place on 1 April 1991.

== See also ==
- Chile under Pinochet
- Armed resistance in Chile (1973–90)
- Chilean transition to democracy
- List of military units named after people
