= Prisons in Chile =

Prisons in Chile are generally poor. Prisons often are overcrowded and antiquated, with substandard sanitary conditions.

== Background ==
In December 2009 there were approximately 50,000 prisoners in prisons designed to hold 33,000 inmates. Prisons in the Santiago Metropolitan Region were at nearly double capacity. The 2006 Diego Portales University School of Law study on prison conditions reiterated that prison services such as health care remained substandard. Prison food meets minimal nutritional needs, and prisoners can supplement their diets by buying food. Those with sufficient funds often can "rent" space in a better wing of the prison.

In isolated instances prisoners have died due to lack of clear prison procedures and insufficient medical resources in the prisons. In December 2006 prison officials reported that deaths by preventable causes increased to 46 in 2005 (compared with 24 in 2004) and continued to increase during the year. As of October 13, 2006, 38 inmates had been killed by other prisoners, and 16 inmates had committed suicide.

A study by the public defender's office in seven of 13 regions reported that during 2005, 59 percent of prisoners claimed to have been victims of abuse or attacks. In 34 percent of reported abuse cases, the alleged offenders were prison officials. Seventeen percent of prisoners reported receiving physical punishment, and 6 percent of prisoners described their physical punishment as "torture."

The government permits prison visits by independent human rights observers, and such visits take place. These include regular visits by Catholic and Protestant clerics and the NGO Paternitas. Amnesty International and the International Committee of the Red Cross have also been granted access to facilities and prisoners. Prisoner rights groups continue to investigate alleged use of excessive force against detainees and particularly were concerned with the treatment of prisoners in maximum security prisons. Prisoners with HIV/AIDS and mental disabilities allegedly fail to receive adequate medical attention.

During 2006 one court case alleging physical abuse or negligence was filed against prison officials. Of the eight court cases filed in 2005, two officials had been absolved; charges were dropped in another case; and one official convicted for abuse received a suspended sentence, a two-month suspension, and was fined $700 (364,000 pesos) plus court costs. Judicial action in the remaining cases continued at the end of 2006. As of August 2006, courts had not substantiated any of the 29 complaints alleging abuse or negligence that were filed during the year. The Gendarmeria also conducted administrative investigations into all allegations of abuse.

=== Punta Peuco prison ===
Punta Peuco Prison is a special facility specifically built in 1995 for human rights offenders located on the outskirts of Santiago, holds around 70 inmates and is considerably more comfortable than a standard Chilean jail. After considerable military protest and insubordination in response to the sentences against violations of the human rights it was built within a military terrain but it is administered by gendarmería as other prisons.

On 22 July 1995 some 1,500 people, many of them members of the army, attended a rally outside the Punta Peuco prison in solidarity for Brigadier Espinoza. Inmates have included Manuel Contreras, Raúl Iturriaga, Pedro Espinoza and Marcelo Moren Brito.

=== 2010 Santiago prison fire ===
On 8 December 2010 a conflagration in the San Miguel prison in Santiago killed 81 inmates in Chile's deadliest prison incident.

The fire broke out at 5:30am Chile Daylight Time (8:30am GMT) on the third floor, reportedly during a fight between rival gangs who set mattresses alight. Local firefighters took around three hours to bring the fire under control.

81 inmates were reported killed, and 14 suffered life-threatening burns, according to health minister Jaime Mañalich. One firefighter and two prison guards also suffered lesser injuries. According to Chile's Fundacion Paz Ciudadana, the prison's capacity is 892, but was heavily overcrowded with 1,654 inmates.

The incident prompted Chile's president Sebastián Piñera to call for an end to the overcrowding in the country's prison system, saying: "We cannot keep living with a prison system which is absolutely inhumane. We are going to speed up the process to ensure our country has a humane, dignified prison system that befits a civilised country."

== Statistics ==
Penal population as of November 30, 2010.

Type	Men	Women	Total	%	Notes
Closed subsystem	48,225	4,734	52,959	49.07	Prison inmates.
Semi-open subsystem	650	42	692	0.64	Inmates in educational and work centers.
Open subsystem	46,669	7,599	54,268	50.29	Includes those on parole, probation, etc.
Total	95,544	12,375	107,919	100.00	
