= National Information Center (Chile) =

Secret Police of Augusto Pinochet's military dictatorship, 1977–1990

- "Central Nacional de Informaciones"
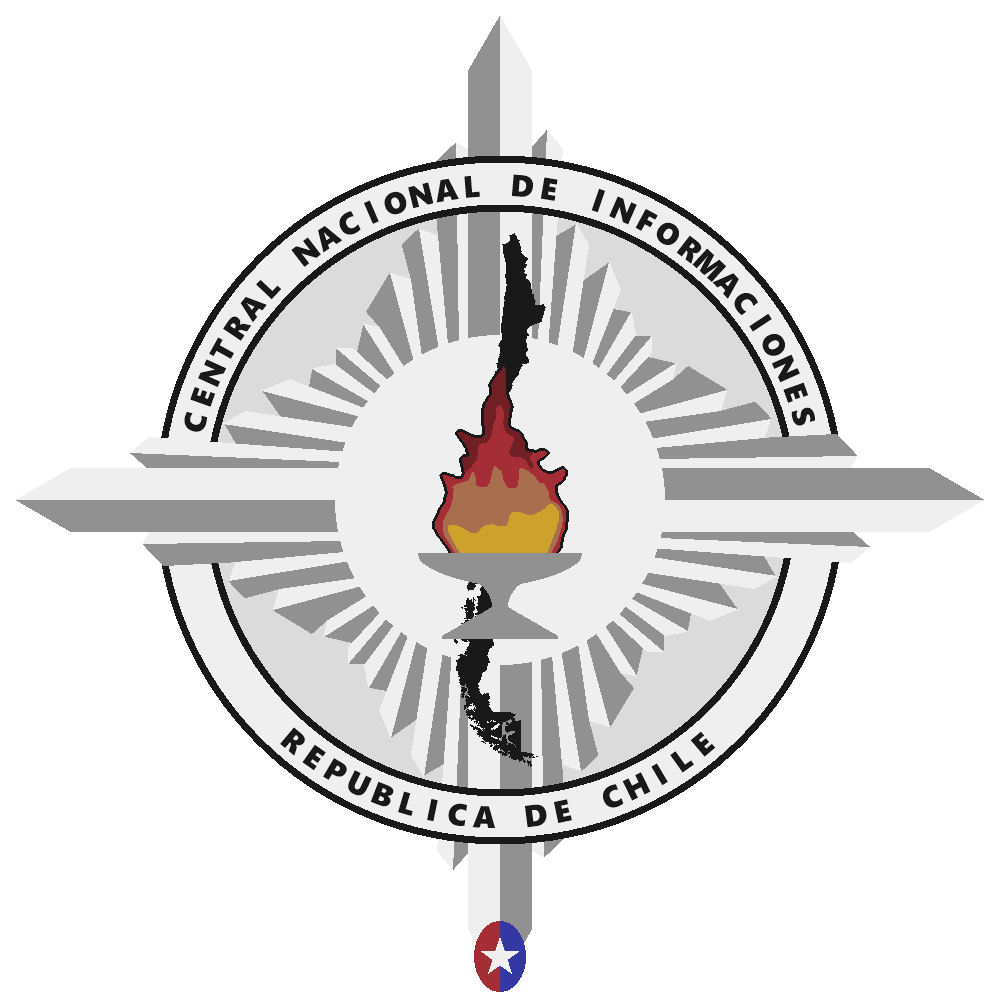

Agency overview
- Formed: August 13, 1977
- Preceding agency: Dirección de Inteligencia Nacional
- Dissolved: February 22, 1990
- Type: Secret police

The National Information Center (Spanish: Central Nacional de Informaciones, CNI) was the political police and intelligence body which functioned as an organ of persecution, kidnapping, torture, murder and disappearance of political opponents during the military dictatorship of Augusto Pinochet in Chile. The predecessor of the CNI, the Directorate of National Intelligence (DINA), had been dissolved due to pressure from the United States government as a result of the assassination of Orlando Letelier in exile in Washington in 1977.

== History ==
The CNI was created on August 13, 1977 by the Decree of Law 1878, with the objective of "gathering and processing all the information at the national level, coming from the different fields of action, that the Supreme Government requires for the creation of policies, plans and programs and the adoption of necessary measures to safeguard national security and the normal development of national activities and maintenance of the established institutions". The CNI was a "military body, a member of the National Defense," which gave it independence in its actions; however, its relationship with the government was through the Ministry of the Interior. In other words, the CNI depended on the President of the Republic.

Its first director was the general Manuel Contreras, an ex-militant of the DINA, and he was replaced by Odlanier Mena in 1977, who was in command until 1980, the year in which he was replaced by General Humberto Gordon. Gordon's tenure was marked by several of the most iconic episodes starring the CNI. Humberto Gordon became a member of the Military Junta in 1986, being replaced in the CNI by Hugo Salas Wenzel.

The CNI was responsible for numerous cases of repression, political infiltration, assassinations, kidnapping and torture of people, including the murder of the union leader Tucapel Jiménez, the carpenter Juan Alegría Mundaca, and the so-called Operation Albania. His participation in the alleged poisoning that would have caused the death of former President of the Republic Eduardo Frei Montalva in 1982 is currently being investigated.

One of its main agents in charge was Álvaro Corbalán, who is currently serving multiple prison sentences for crimes against humanity. Among other crimes, there is the poisoning and use of sarin gas and other toxins, in prisoners opposed to the regime, the Frei case being perhaps the best known. One of his agents, Eugenio Berríos, who was assassinated by former CNI agents in Uruguay, was the chemist who used the deadly toxins on his victims.

The CNI was also responsible for the assassinations of various former members of the Revolutionary Left Movement (Movimiento de Izquierda Revolucionaria, MIR) during the 1980s, in which they used the tactic of "false confrontations." They are also related to the robbery of banks, drug trafficking and illegal weapons, and the fraud called "La Cutufa", which involved one of Augusto Pinochet's sons.

It was dissolved on February 22, 1990 by Law 18,943, shortly before the return to democracy. Many of its agents were reassigned to public safety, industrial or commercial duties during the 1990s.

== Directors ==
- Manuel Contreras (13 August – November 1977)
- Odlanier Mena (November 1977 – 23 July 1980)
- Humberto Gordon (23 July 1980 – 11 December 1986)
- Hugo Salas Wenzel (11 December 1986 – 23 November 1988)
- Humberto Leiva (23 November 1988 – 24 April 1989)
- Gustavo Abarzúa (24 April 1989 – 22 February 1990)

== See also ==
- Operation Condor
- Dirección de Inteligencia Nacional
