= Nicolás Díaz =

Nicolás Díaz may refer to:

- Nicolás Díaz (politician)
- Nicolás Díaz (footballer)
