= Isabel Margarita Morel =

Chilean human rights activist

Isabel Margarita Morel, 1982

Isabel Margarita Morel Gumucio (January 3, 1932-October 30, 2026), also known as Isabel Letelier was a Chilean educator, human rights defender, and tireless activist in exile, as well as the widow of the murdered former Chilean Foreign Minister Orlando Letelierand mother of former Chilean Senator Juan Pablo Letelier

== Family and Education ==
Isabel was born in Santiago, Chile, the daughter of Alfredo Morel Henríquez and Victoria Gumucio Pérez, and grew up there. Her father was an executive at a paper company, while her mother managed the home and was a renowned fitness teacher. She completed a traditional college degree in education and philosophy at the Pontificia Universidad Católica de Chile, where she earned her university degree. In addition, she took courses in painting, drawing, and sculpture at the Faculty of Fine Arts of the Universidad de Chile. She married Orlando Letelier in 1955 and moved abroad with her husband, first to Venezuela, where he worked as a consultant. Soon after, in 1960, Letelier accepted a position in Washington, D.C., at the newly founded Inter-American Development Bank. The Letelier-Morel family then moved to that city with their sons Cristián, José, and Francisco. The youngest of them, Juan Pablo Letelier Morel, was born in Washington (he later became a senator of the Republic of Chile).

When President Salvador Allende appointed her husband as Chile's ambassador to the United States in 1971, Isabel Margarita Morel returned to Washington, where she worked as a Spanish teacher. In 1973, Letelier returned to Chile with his family to take up the post of Minister of Foreign Affairs, followed by that of Minister of the Interior, and finally that of Minister of Defense.

== Military Coup and Exile in the United States ==
The military coup of September 11, 1973 had a decisive impact on the fate of Isabel Morel and her entire family.

Barely two weeks before the bombing of the presidential palace in Chile, Isabel had been received by General Augusto Pinochet, then commander-in-chief of the Chilean Army, on the occasion of Orlando Letelier’s swearing-in as defense minister. Pinochet expressed his pride and satisfaction at her husband’s appointment to that office. After the coup, however, Letelier was the first high-ranking member of the Allende government to be arrested by agents of the dictatorship. He was initially held in solitary confinement and tortured, being subsequently transferred to the Isla Dawson concentration camp in the south of the country. From that moment on, Isabel Morel worked tirelessly to secure her husband’s release. After a year in prison and numerous political and diplomatic efforts, his sentence was commuted in September 1974 to deportation to Venezuela. The couple was reunited in Caracas and traveled from there to the United States, where they were granted political asylum.

Isabel immediately began to get involved in solidarity efforts with Chile and played a prominent role in organizing the reception of political asylum seekers. She founded the Chilean Committee for Human Rights and was able to recruit prominent figures to serve on its board: Nobel laureates, prominent religious leaders, and renowned politicians, including, among others, Senator Edward Kennedy. Orlando Letelier, for his part, began working at the Institute for Political Studies (IPS), a progressive research center, and was regarded as one of the most important political leaders of the overthrown Allende government abroad.

== After the Assassination of Orlando Letelier: Work at IPS ==
Isabel Margarita Morel (center) at a solidarity march for Chile in Amsterdam on September 11, 1982

Two years later, on September 21, 1976, Orlando Letelier was killed by agents of the DINA with an explosive device planted under the car he was driving with his assistant, Ronni Moffitt (who also died in the attack), and her husband, who survived.

From that point on, Isabel Margarita further intensified her commitment to human rights, to solving the crime committed against her husband, and to ending the dictatorship in Chile. She was hired by IPS to lead its human rights project. She undertook numerous diplomatic efforts and met with key figures in U.S., Chilean, and Latin American politics. She is believed to have played a decisive role in exerting pressure and persuading U.S. authorities to take the Letelier case seriously, which ultimately led to its resolution.She organized press conferences and built solidarity networks with political, artistic, religious, academic, and labor organizations, as well as civil society groups. In this context, she traveled extensively both within and outside the United States to participate in international solidarity actions with Chile. She also coordinated communication efforts, processed information received from Chile, verified the sources, and ultimately forwarded the information to Congress, the State Department, the press, and the public.

Katherine Hite, a political scientist and professor at Vassar College, who worked with Isabel at the IPS in the 1980s, explained in an interview: “Isabel had a sense of what human rights constitutes: social and economic rights; things like housing and health care, not the way human rights was discussed in the United States at the time.” Among her contributions to the IPS human rights program is the establishment of the institute’s annual Letelier-Moffitt Prize, an award that has been conferred on approximately one hundred U.S. and Latin American human rights activists over the past five decades.

Nevertheless, she continued to be involved in grassroots activism, participating in street demonstrations and public outreach efforts.

In addition, as a committed feminist, she organized numerous women's gatherings, conferences, workshops, and meetings on the topic of women's rights in the 1970s and 1980s.She also collaborated with Latin American women's organizations. Of particular note is her commitment to organizing women working in the domestic sector.In 1981, she founded the “Project for Women from the Third World” as an organization affiliated with the IPS.

Furthermore, as a curator, she took charge of the institute’s historical art collection, which consisted of about 200 “Arpilleras” (wall hangings sewn and embroidered on burlap) created by Chilean women that told stories of state violence during the dictatorship. These tapestries were originally created in a women’s prison in Santiago, Chile. She organized a tour of the United States with some of the Arpilleristas.

Around 1985, she founded a new organization that was better suited to the resurgence of protests in Chile and the now-looming end of the military dictatorship: the “Working Group for Democracy in Chile,” which operated out of the IPS.

== Return to Chile ==
At some point—which the available sources do not specify exactly, but which was after the end of the dictatorship in 1990—Isabel Margarita returned to Chile to live there.

After her return to Chile, she actively continued her commitment to confronting the past, defending human rights, and seeking justice for the murder of her husband and the other victims of the military dictatorship. In 1998, following the arrest of Augusto Pinochet in London, she actively participated in interviews and public statements in which she called for the criminal conviction of Augusto Pinochet for his direct involvement in the crimes of the dictatorship, including assassinations abroad, such as that of her husband or that of General Carlos Prats in Buenos Aires.

Among her contributions to historical processing is, in particular, her commitment to platforms for the preservation of documents, such as the archive of the Museo de la Memoria y los Derechos Humanos, to which she contributed firsthand accounts of the assassination of Orlando Letelier, political imprisonment on Dawson Island, exile, and the struggle of the victims’ families.

Isabel Margarita died at the age of 94 in the same city where she was born. Her death occurred just five weeks after the 50th anniversary of the assassination of Orlando Letelier, which had been widely reported in the international press.The funeral took place on November 1, 2026, at the “Parque del Recuerdo” cemetery.
