= Assassination of Orlando Letelier =

1976 car bombing in Washington, D.C., US

Coordinates: 38°54′42.7″N 77°3′1.1″W

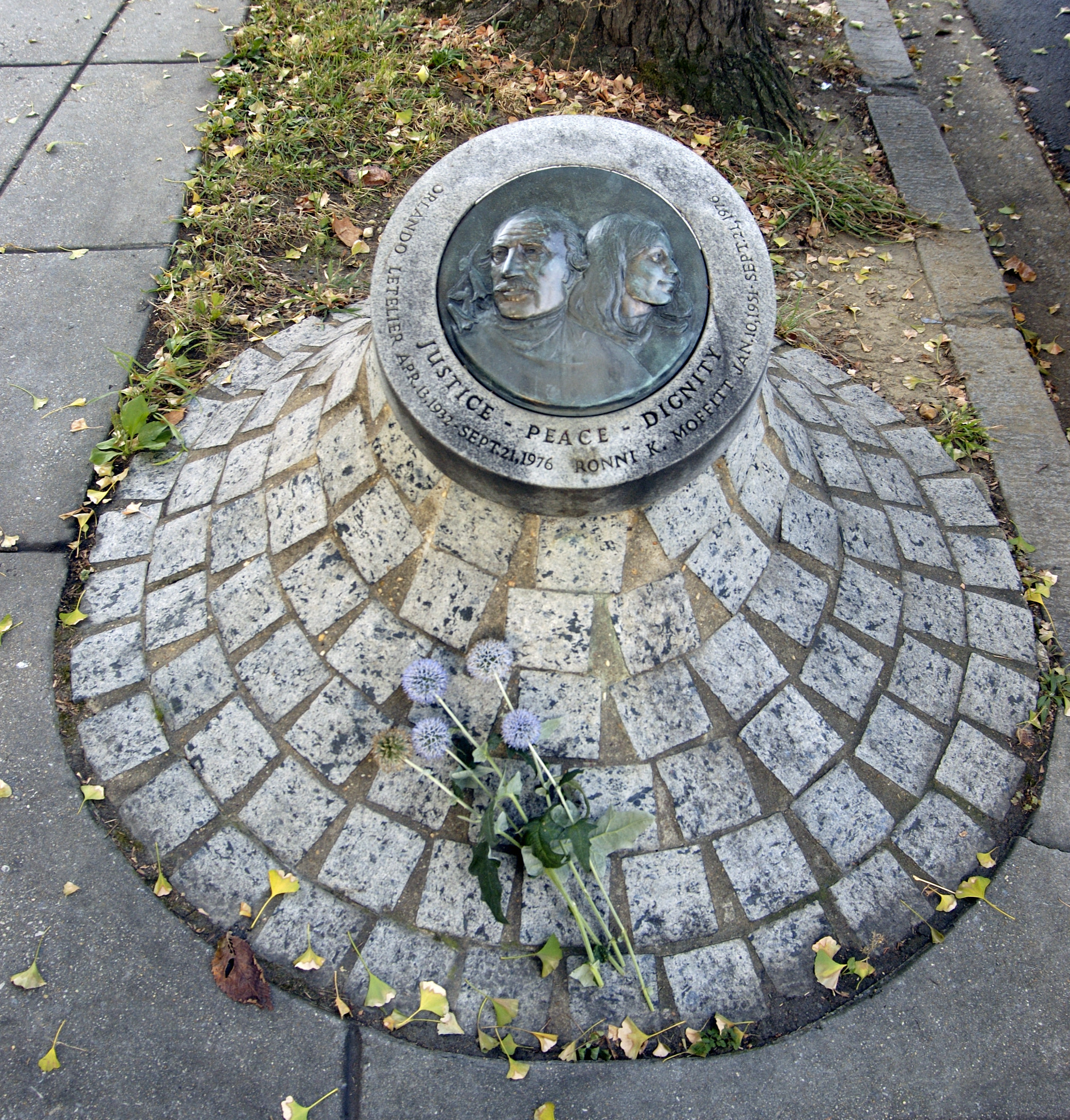
- Memorial to Letelier and Moffitt in Washington, D.C.
- Location: Washington, D.C., United States
- Date: September 21, 1976; 9:30 am (UTC-04:00)
- Target: Orlando Letelier
- Attack type: Car bombing
- Deaths: 2
- Injuries: 1
- Perpetrator: DINA

On September 21, 1976, Orlando Letelier, a former Chilean diplomat and a leading opponent of dictator Augusto Pinochet, was killed by a remotely detonated car bomb in Washington, D.C. Letelier, who had been living in exile in the United States since 1974, was driving to his office at the Institute for Policy Studies when the bomb exploded beneath his car at Sheridan Circle on Embassy Row. He was killed instantly; his American colleague Ronni Karpen Moffitt, a 25-year-old fundraiser riding in the front passenger seat, died within the hour of injuries from flying shrapnel. Her husband, Michael Moffitt, who was seated in the back, survived with minor wounds.

The assassination of Orlando Letelier was carried out by agents of the DINA, Chile's secret police, in cooperation with anti-Castro Cuban exiles, as part of Operation Condor, a campaign of transnational repression by South American military governments against their political opponents. Declassified U.S. intelligence documents released in 2015 indicate that Pinochet personally ordered the killing in an effort to silence the most effective international voice of the Chilean resistance. The attack, carried out fifteen blocks from the White House, was for decades regarded as the most serious act of state-sponsored terrorism ever committed in Washington, D.C.

U.S. investigators identified DINA operative Michael Townley, an American expatriate living in Chile, as the bomb-maker, working with Chilean army captain Armando Fernández Larios and a cell of Cuban exiles recruited in the United States. Townley and several of the Cuban exiles were convicted in U.S. federal court, while DINA director Manuel Contreras and his deputy Pedro Espinoza were convicted in Chile in 1993 of ordering Letelier's murder. Pinochet himself was never charged. In June 2026, a Chilean court separately convicted Espinoza and two other former DINA officers, Pedro Octavio "José" Zara Holger and Raúl Iturriaga Neumann, specifically for the killing of Moffitt, closing the last open prosecution in the case fifty years after the bombing. The bombing prompted lasting controversy over how much U.S. intelligence agencies knew of the plot in advance, and over the Central Intelligence Agency's subsequent handling of the case.

== Background ==
=== Ambassador and minister ===
In 1971, Letelier was appointed ambassador to the United States by Salvador Allende, the socialist president of Chile. Letelier had lived in Washington during the 1960s while working for the Inter-American Development Bank and had supported Allende's presidential campaign; Allende believed that Letelier's experience and contacts in international banking would help develop U.S.–Chilean relations. During 1973, Letelier served successively as Minister of Foreign Affairs, Interior Minister, and finally Defense Minister. After the Chilean coup of 1973 brought Pinochet to power, Letelier was among the first members of the Allende government to be arrested and was sent to a political prison in Tierra del Fuego.

He was held for twelve months in a succession of camps and subjected to severe torture, first at the Tacna Regiment and then at the Military Academy in Santiago, before being sent for eight months to the prison camp on Dawson Island. He was later transferred to the basement of the Air Force War Academy and finally to the Ritoque concentration camp. International diplomatic pressure—particularly from Diego Arria, then governor of the Federal District of Venezuela, and U.S. Secretary of State Henry Kissinger—secured Letelier's sudden release in 1974 on condition that he leave Chile immediately for Venezuela. The officer overseeing his release warned him that "the arm of DINA is long" and that Pinochet would not tolerate activity against his government from abroad, a clear signal that exile would not guarantee his safety.

=== Exile activism ===
After settling in Washington in 1974, Letelier became a senior fellow at the Institute for Policy Studies, an independent think tank. He spent the following two years writing, speaking, and lobbying the U.S. Congress and European governments against Pinochet's regime, quickly becoming the most visible international voice of the Chilean resistance and helping to block a number of prospective European loans to the military government. (Note: Historian Alan McPherson described Contreras, who later ordered Letelier's death, as an "archetypal Cold War psychopath" responsible for roughly a third of the approximately 3,000 killings attributed to the Pinochet regime.) Colleagues described him as "the most respected and effective spokesman in the international campaign to condemn and isolate" Pinochet's government. Letelier was assisted at the institute by Ronni Moffitt, a 25-year-old fundraiser who also ran a program supplying musical instruments to poor children and campaigned for democracy in Chile.

Letelier's growing prominence made him a target of Operation Condor, the intelligence-sharing and assassination program organized by right-wing South American governments to eliminate exiled opponents. DINA had already killed one prominent exile, former army commander Carlos Prats, with a car bomb in Buenos Aires on September 30, 1974. DINA director Manuel Contreras came to regard Letelier as a central obstacle to the regime's international standing.

In October 1975, Letelier became director of the international political economy program at the Transnational Institute, a progressive think tank affiliated with the Institute for Policy Studies. Through the institute's Amsterdam office, he successfully lobbied the Dutch government to cancel a planned $63 million line of credit to the Chilean mining industry. On September 10, 1976, the Chilean government revoked Letelier's citizenship, with Pinochet's decree citing his interference "with normal financial support to Chile" and his efforts "to hinder or prevent the investment of Dutch capital in Chile". That evening, speaking at the Felt Forum in Madison Square Garden, Letelier declared:

Today Pinochet has signed a decree in which it is said that I am deprived of my nationality. This is an important day for me. A dramatic day in my life in which the action of the fascist generals against me makes me feel more Chilean than ever. Because we are the true Chileans, in the tradition of O'Higgins, Balmaceda, Allende, Neruda, Gabriela Mistral, Claudio Arrau and Víctor Jara, and they – the fascists – are the enemies of Chile, the traitors who are selling our country to foreign investments. I was born a Chilean, I am a Chilean and I will die a Chilean. They were born traitors, they live as traitors and they will be known forever as fascist traitors.

== Planning of the assassination ==
In mid-1976, Contreras and Espinoza, DINA's director of operations, ordered Townley and Fernández Larios to travel to Paraguay to obtain Paraguayan passports and U.S. visas under false names. The scheme was nearly exposed when the U.S. ambassador to Paraguay, George W. Landau, grew suspicious of the visa applications, secretly photocopied the passports, and then revoked the visas. Contreras and Espinoza nonetheless proceeded with the plot, sending Fernández Larios to Washington under a Chilean alias, accompanied by a female DINA agent, to surveil Letelier's movements. Townley, using yet another falsified Chilean passport, entered the United States in August 1976, met Cuban National Movement leader Guillermo Novo in Union City, New Jersey, and traveled on to Washington, where he assembled a remote-controlled bomb from commercially available components.

According to journalist Jean-Guy Allard, the operation's Cuban participants were selected following consultations with leaders of the Coordination of United Revolutionary Organizations (CORU), including Luis Posada Carriles and Orlando Bosch; those chosen to carry out the bombing were Cuban-Americans José Dionisio Suárez, Virgilio Paz Romero, Alvin Ross Díaz, and brothers Guillermo and Ignacio Novo Sampol. On September 18, 1976, Townley, Paz, and Suárez attached the bomb to the underside of Letelier's Chevrolet Chevelle Malibu outside his home in Bethesda, Maryland. According to the Miami Herald, Posada Carriles attended the planning meeting that also helped set in motion the bombing of Cubana Flight 455 two weeks later.

== Attack ==
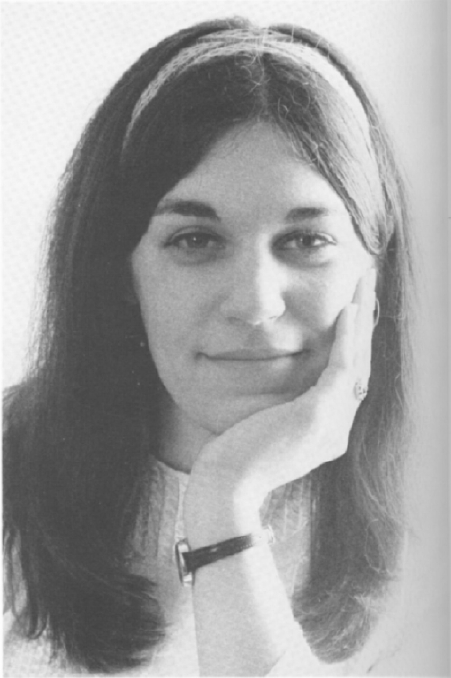
Ronni Moffitt, killed in the car bombing, worked at the Institute for Policy Studies in Washington, D.C.

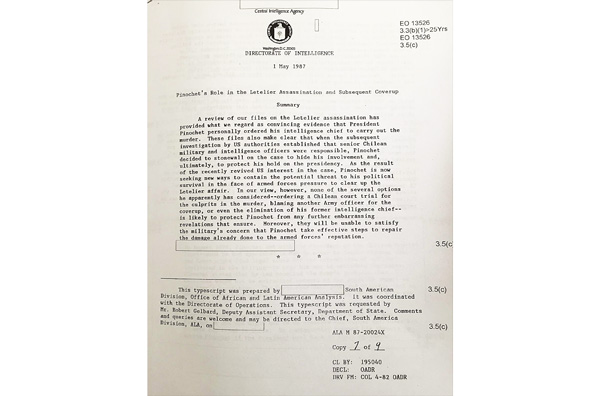
A 1978 Central Intelligence Agency estimate concludes that Pinochet "personally ordered" the assassination of Letelier

On the morning of September 21, 1976, Letelier drove to work with Ronni Moffitt, seated in the front passenger seat, and her husband of four months, Michael, in the back seat; the Moffitts had taken Letelier's car that day because their own was in the shop. A car carrying two Cuban exiles tailed Letelier's vehicle from his home along River Road and into the city. As Letelier rounded Sheridan Circle on Embassy Row at about 9:30 am, the bomb detonated beneath the driver's seat, lifting the car off the ground and severing Letelier's legs; he died within minutes. The car came to a stop after colliding with a Volkswagen parked in front of the Irish Embassy. Michael Moffitt escaped through the rear window and, believing his wife was safe after seeing her stumble from the wreck, turned to try to help Letelier.

Shrapnel had severed Ronni Moffitt's larynx and carotid artery; she drowned in her own blood roughly half an hour after Letelier's death. Michael Moffitt suffered only minor injuries. Both victims were taken to George Washington University Medical Center, where they were pronounced dead. Investigators determined the bomb was a molded plastic explosive attached to the underside of the car and detonated by remote control rather than a timer, concentrating its blast into the driver's seat and blowing a hole roughly two feet in diameter in the floor.

Diego Arria, who had helped secure Letelier's release from prison two years earlier, again intervened to arrange for Letelier's body to be flown to Caracas, Venezuela, for burial, where it remained until the end of Pinochet's rule.

== Investigation and prosecution ==
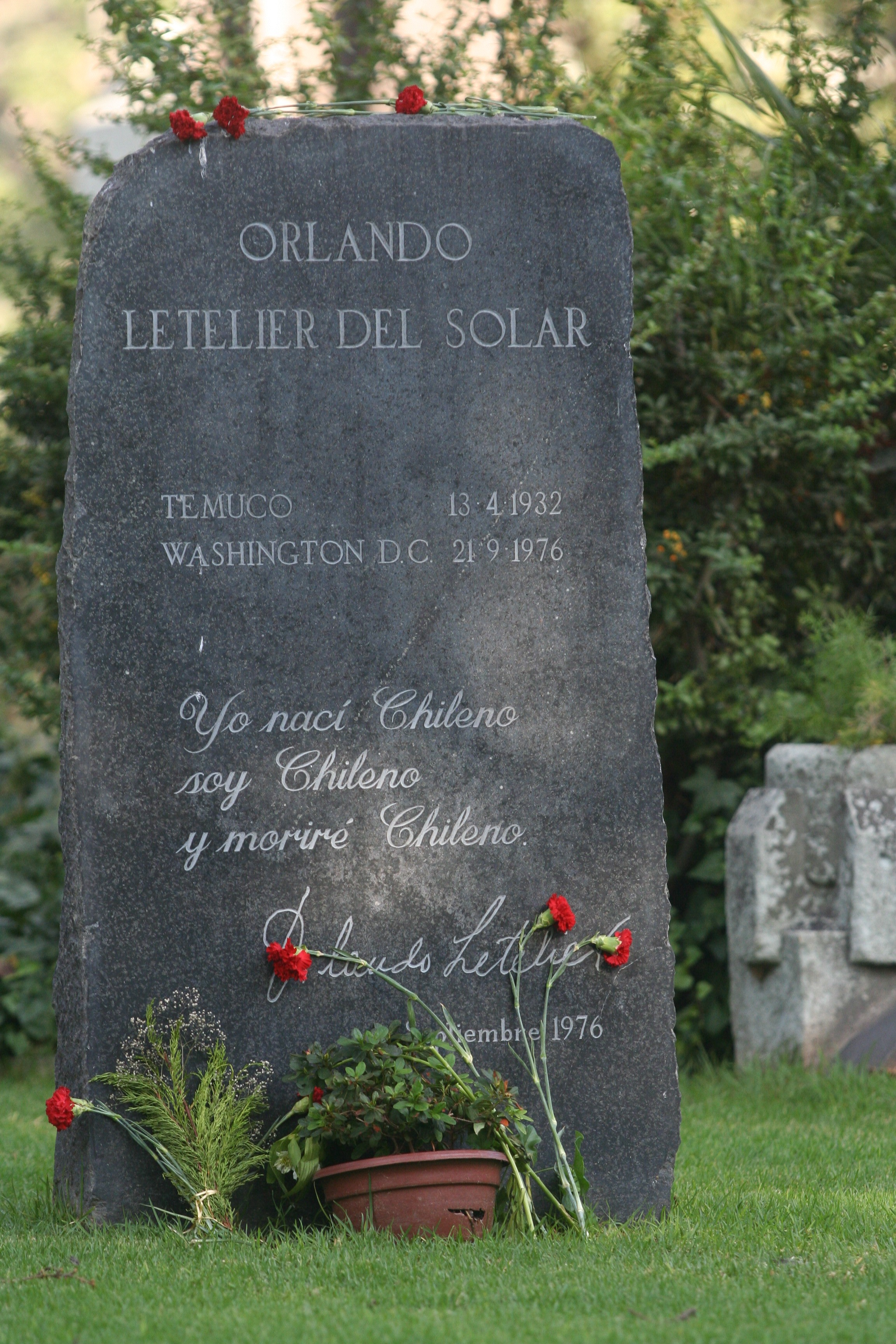
Grave of Letelier in the Santiago General Cemetery in Chile

In the days after the bombing, the United States Department of State said it viewed Letelier's death with "gravest concern", and the Federal Bureau of Investigation (FBI) said it was the first act of violence against Chilean exiles it had recorded on U.S. soil. Investigators initially considered a range of motives, including the possibility that the killing was connected to the earlier assassination of Carlos Prats and the attempted assassination of Bernardo Leighton. A week after the bombing, the FBI's legal attaché in Buenos Aires cabled Washington, citing a source inside Argentine intelligence, that the killing was likely the work of a covert third phase of Operation Condor involving cross-border assassination teams.

The FBI eventually identified Townley as the organizer of the bombing. In 1978, after taking over as director of the newly created National Information Center, General Odlanier Mena established a body to investigate the DINA’s involvement in the assassination of Orlando Letelier. According to a report in El Mercurio from April 2, 2000, based on Mena’s testimony, Manuel Contreras denied knowing Michael Townley or having employed him as a DINA agent. Mena, who had received information from the FBI regarding purchases of electronic equipment made by Townley on behalf of the DINA, didn't believe him cast doubt on those claims and brought the matter before the Military Junta, which met with the former head of the DINA. In the meeting Pinochet asked Contreras if he knew Townley, something he denied three times, then he claimed that Townley had never worked for the Chilean intelligence and that, in the worst-case scenario, he might have acted as an informant. Based on those assurances, he was handed over to the U.S.

Following the meeting, the Junta authorized Townley's expulsion or handover to the United States, where he was interrogated and prosecuted for his participation in the bombing. Townley's departure from Chile did not take place through a conventional extradition process and was considered an expulsion. In addition, Townley also sought protection from Manuel Contreras and Pedro Espinoza.

He arrived in the United States on April 8, 1978, and there he negotiated to accept responsibility for building and planting the bomb. Townley pleaded guilty to conspiracy to commit murder in exchange for a ten-year sentence and received a reduced sentence and future immunity in exchange for testifying against his co-conspirators, five Cuban exiles. The formal indictment filed by U.S. authorities in 1978 did not include Augusto Pinochet; it targeted Manuel Contreras, Pedro Espinoza, Armando Fernández Larios and Cuban collaborators linked to the bombing, based on the testimony provided by Townley. Townley was also linked by later investigations to the bombings against Carlos Prats and Bernardo Leighton. After roughly half his sentence, he was released under the federal Witness Protection Program. His wife, Mariana Callejas, agreed to testify in exchange for immunity from prosecution.

On January 9, 1979, the trial of the Novo Sampol brothers and Alvin Ross Díaz began in Washington. All three were convicted of murder, with Guillermo Novo and Díaz sentenced to life imprisonment and Ignacio Novo to eight years; the convictions were later overturned on appeal on an evidentiary issue and the three were acquitted at retrial. José Dionisio Suárez and Virgilio Paz Romero remained fugitives until they were captured in 1990 and 1991, respectively; each pleaded guilty to conspiracy to commit murder and received twelve-year sentences. In 1987, Fernández Larios fled Chile with FBI assistance, saying he feared Pinochet planned to kill him for refusing to help cover up the murders; he pleaded guilty that year to acting as an accessory to murder and received a reduced sentence in exchange for cooperating with investigators.

In Chile, a special judge appointed by the Supreme Court convicted Contreras and Espinoza on November 12, 1993, of ordering the assassination, sentencing them to seven and six years' imprisonment, respectively; the Chilean Supreme Court upheld the convictions on May 30, 1995. Contreras evaded imprisonment for several years before being incarcerated at Punta Peuco Prison in October 1995. He was later convicted in dozens of additional human-rights cases and, at the time of his death in a Santiago military hospital on August 7, 2015, was serving cumulative sentences exceeding 500 years; he had spent his final years denying responsibility for the Letelier bombing and blaming the CIA.

For decades, the killing of Moffitt herself was never separately adjudicated in Chile, since her death had been treated as incidental to the case against Letelier's killers. In June 2026, following a fifteen-year investigation, Chilean human-rights judge Paola Plaza González convicted Espinoza and fellow former DINA officers José Zara Holger and Raúl Iturriaga Neumann of aggravated homicide specifically for Moffitt's killing, sentencing each to fifteen years in prison; the ruling found that DINA had planned the operation "carefully" and consummated it "consciously". That same year, U.S. immigration authorities detained Fernández Larios and Paz Romero, both of whom had settled in the United States after their releases, on grounds related to their roles in the bombing; both faced possible deportation.

Pinochet, who died on December 10, 2006, was never charged in the case, although declassified U.S. intelligence assessments concluded he had ordered it. Attorney General Janet Reno authorized a renewed "CHILBOM" investigation into Pinochet's culpability in 1999, and a Justice Department task force traveled to Chile in 2000 to depose Contreras and interview former U.S. officials, including Kissinger, but the incoming administration of George W. Bush took no further action on the resulting recommendations.

== Cover-up ==
A U.S. Department of Justice affidavit dated August 23, 1991, detailed extensive efforts by the Pinochet government to conceal its role in the killings, an operation the regime code-named "Operación Mascarada".

Confessional letters that Townley wrote to Contreras in 1978, published by the National Security Archive in 2015, show Townley complaining that Contreras had misled Pinochet about the operation and warning that the scandal could bring down the government unless Pinochet was told "the truth and real magnitude of this problem." In another 1978 statement, Townley acknowledged that he had acted on Contreras's orders and described receiving instructions to carry out the bombing from Espinoza; he also stated that he had recruited the Cuban-American assassination team himself after entering the United States on the false Paraguayan documents.

== Allegations of U.S. foreknowledge ==
Chilean officers Raúl Iturriaga Neumann and Manuel Contreras later claimed that Townley had received his assassination orders from the CIA rather than DINA, accusing him of lying to implicate Pinochet and the Chilean government—a claim Townley had anticipated and denied in his own confessions.

Independent evidence nonetheless points to extensive contemporaneous U.S. knowledge of the plot. In July 1976, weeks before the bombing, the CIA station in Montevideo learned that Uruguayan intelligence officers linked to Operation Condor had discussed sending Chilean agents into the United States to assassinate U.S. Congressman Ed Koch over his sponsorship of legislation cutting military aid to Uruguay; the station chief recommended no action be taken because the officers had been drinking when the threat was made. Then-CIA Director George H. W. Bush warned Koch of the threat and shared the intelligence with the FBI and State Departlament only after the Letelier bombing occurred.

That same summer, when Townley and Fernández Larios sought false Paraguayan visas, Ambassador Landau grew suspicious after learning the two men were said to be traveling to CIA headquarters to meet with the agency's deputy director, Vernon A. Walters; Walters denied any scheduled meeting, and Landau revoked the visas. According to journalist John Dinges, documents declassified in 1999 and 2000 show that the CIA had general intelligence about the Condor network's plans to kill exiled dissidents outside Latin America at least two months before the bombing, but did not identify Letelier as a specific target and took no action to prevent the attack.

Historian Kenneth Maxwell has written that U.S. policymakers were aware Chilean agents were planning to enter the United States, and that Kissinger ordered in August 1976 that Southern Cone governments be warned that assassinations of "subversives, politicians and prominent figures" abroad would create "a most serious moral and political problem"; the U.S. embassy in Santiago, however, declined to deliver the warning for fear of angering Pinochet, and on September 20, 1976—the day before the bombing—the State Department instructed its ambassadors to take no further action on the matter. In 2010, the Associated Press reported that a newly declassified State Department cable showed Kissinger himself had ordered the warning to Chile canceled just days before the attack.

After the bombing, the CIA publicly and privately cleared DINA of involvement, feeding an assessment to Newsweek in October 1976 stating that Chilean intelligence had not been involved. In 2000 the agency officially acknowledged for the first time that Contreras had been a paid CIA asset and that its own internal reporting had identified the Chilean government's likely role within weeks of the bombing. A CIA assessment dated May 1, 1987, based on Fernández Larios' testimony, found to contain "convincing evidence that President Pinochet personally ordered his intelligence chief to carry out the murder". The report was withheld from public release for decades; Secretary of State George Shultz subsequently advised President Ronald Reagan that the case was "a blatant example of a chief of state's direct involvement in an act of state terrorism" and urged a stronger push for Chile's return to civilian rule. Pinochet denied the accusations, stating, "Fernández Larios's testimony is worthless. Besides, I wonder how much they paid him".

Separately, FBI-obtained documents from Letelier's briefcase—copied and leaked to columnists Rowland Evans, Robert Novak and Jack Anderson before being returned to his widow—purported to show that Letelier had received funding from the Cuban government, coordinated with exiled leaders of the former Popular Unity coalition in East Berlin, and maintained contact with Beatriz Allende, the daughter of Salvador Allende who was married to a Cuban intelligence official. Letelier's colleague Saul Landau described the leaks as part of an "organized right wing attack," and Letelier's widow, Isabel, wrote in The New York Times in 1980 that the funds described had originated with Western donors and had simply passed through Cuba.

== Diplomatic resolution of civil liability ==
Chile resisted efforts by the Letelier and Moffitt families to have their civil liability claims decided by a U.S. tribunal. State Department deputy legal adviser Michael Kozak proposed resolving the dispute through the arbitration clause of an 1914 Chile–United States peace treaty; Chile agreed, and in the early 1990s an arbitration commission set the compensation to be paid to the two families.

== Legacy ==
A memorial to Letelier and Moffitt stands at Sheridan Circle, near the site of the bombing, inscribed with the words "Justice – Peace – Dignity." The Institute for Policy Studies has held an annual commemoration at the site since the 1970s and presents the Letelier-Moffitt Human Rights Award each year to human-rights defenders around the world. On the fiftieth anniversary of the bombing in September 2026, Chilean President Gabriel Boric traveled to Washington to take part in the commemoration alongside Letelier's son, Juan Pablo Letelier, a former Chilean senator.

In 1995, Juan Pablo Letelier stated that the thousands of pages of case files contained no evidence that the Chilean army as an institution, as opposed to DINA specifically, had participated in his father's murder.

== See also ==
- Attempted assassination of Bernardo Leighton
- Chilean political scandals
- Chile under Pinochet
- Eugenio Berríos, DINA biochemist who allegedly produced the explosive used in the bombing
- List of incidents of political violence in Washington, D.C.
- National Security Archive
- Operation Condor
- United States and state-sponsored terrorism
- United States and state terrorism

== Bibliography ==
- Dinges, John; Landau, Saul (1981), Assassination on Embassy Row, New York: Pantheon Books, ISBN 0-394-50802-5, OCLC 6144488.
- Dinges, John (2004), The Condor Years: How Pinochet and his Allies brought Terrorism to Three Continents, New York: The New Press, ISBN 1-56584-764-4, OCLC 52846073.
- Hitchens, Christopher (2001), The Trial of Henry Kissinger, New York: Verso, ISBN 1-85984-631-9, OCLC 46240330.
- Kornbluh, Peter (2004), The Pinochet File: A Declassified Dossier on Atrocity and Accountability, New York: The New Press, ISBN 1-56584-936-1.
- McCann, Joseph T. (2006), Terrorism on American Soil: A Concise History of Plots and Perpetrators from the Famous to the Forgotten, Boulder: Sentient Publications, ISBN 1-56584-936-1, OCLC 70866968.
- McPherson, Alan (2019). Ghosts of Sheridan Circle: How a Washington Assassination Brought Pinochet's Terror State to Justice. Chapel Hill: The University of North Carolina Press. doi:10.5149/northcarolina/9781469653501.001.0001. ISBN 978-1-4696-5352-5.
- Branch, Taylor; Propper, Eugene (1982), Labyrinth, New York: Viking Press, ISBN 0-670-42492-7, OCLC 8110876.
