= Attempted assassination of Bernardo Leighton =

1975 shooting in Rome, Italy

Leighton case
- Location: Rome, Italy
- Date: 6 October 1975 (UTC+1)
- Target: Bernardo Leighton
- Attack type: shooting
- Deaths: 0
- Injuries: 2
- Perpetrators: DINA, Avanguardia Nazionale
- Motive: political murder

On 6 October 1975, an assassination attempt in Rome, Italy, was carried out against Bernardo Leighton, a former Chilean Christian Democratic vice-president, then in exile. The assassination attempt seriously injured Bernardo Leighton, and his wife, Anita Fresno, leaving her permanently disabled.

Leighton was one of the founding members of the Chilean Christian Democrat Party. In 1966, he entered the government of Eduardo Frei Montalva, becoming a vice-president. Leighton left Chile in December 1973, after the coup d'état. In exile, he opposed the new regime of Pinochet, he had already been nominally open to Salvador Allende. In 1974, a year before the Leighton assassination attempt, General Prats, another Chilean exile, was murdered in the capital of Argentina, Buenos Aires.

In 1995, General Manuel Contreras, head of DINA, was indicted in Italy for ordering the Leighton murder. Part of the indictment was based on testimony from Michael Townley. However, the Italian government was unable to extradite Contreras from Chile, where he was incarcerated for ordering the assassination on Orlando Letelier. The deputy director of DINA, Raúl Iturriaga, was also sentenced. In March 1993, Townley, who confessed to commissioning the murder attempt on behalf of DINA by National Vanguard members, was convicted and sentenced in absentia to 18 years in prison, with two years remission. Nevertheless, Townley still remained a member of the U.S. witness protection program. Vanguard member Vincenzo Vinciguerra, who was already imprisoned, claimed Vanguard leader Stefano Delle Chiaie told him that Chilean ruler Augusto Pinochet directed ordered the attempted assassination. However, Townley, who was acknowledged to have had "direct participation," claimed that he was given orders to carry it out from Manuel Contreras; Townley also previously stated in 1978 that "Most of the orders for assassination operations abroad were given by General Manuel Contreras." Three Vanguard members, including Chiaie, would be acquitted for their alleged roles.

== See also ==
- Operation Condor
- Letelier case
