= Rafael Moreno Rojas =

Chilean politician (1936–2021)

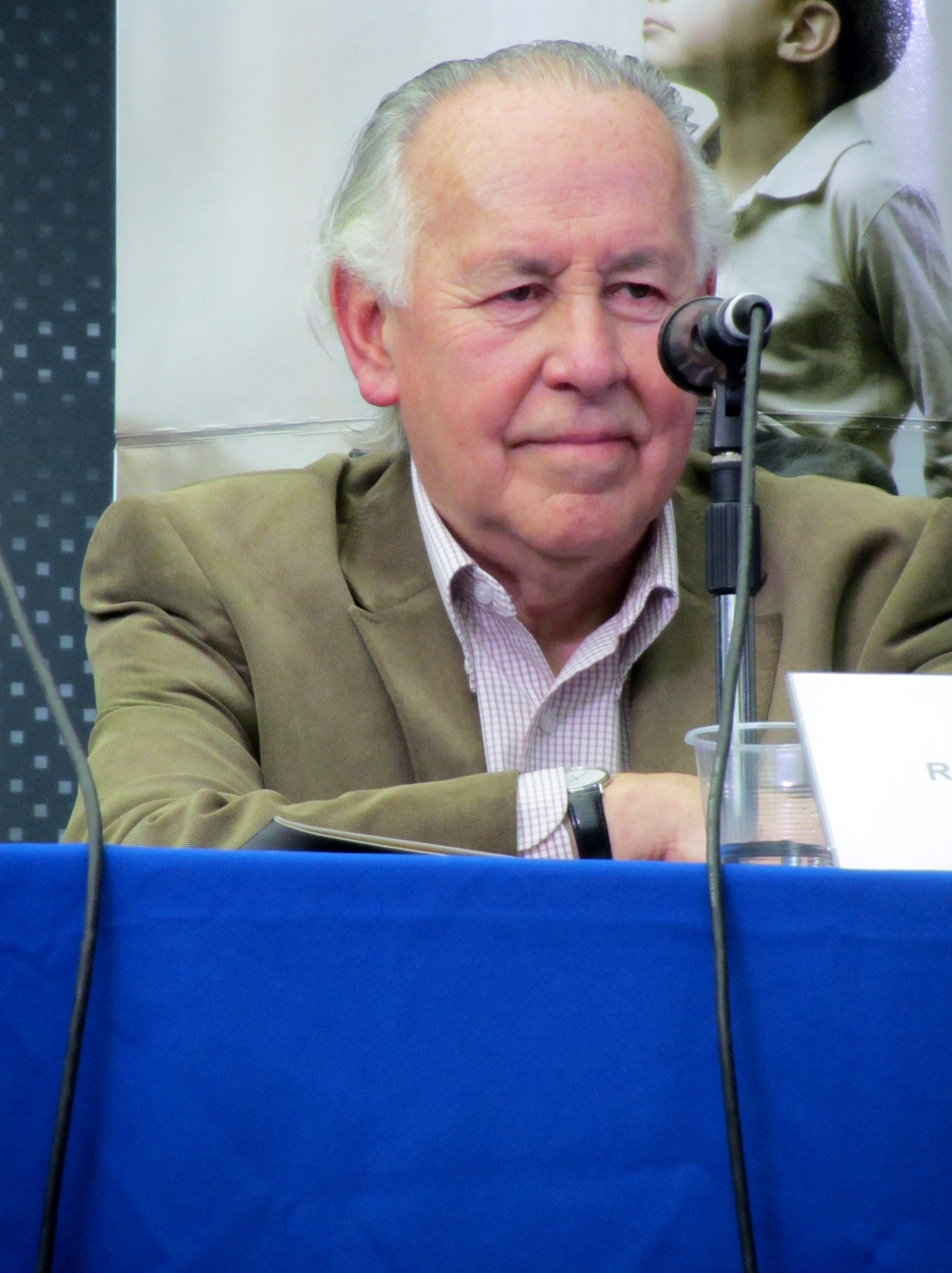

Member of the Senate
- In office 11 March 1998 – 11 March 2006
- Preceded by: Nicolás Díaz
- Succeeded by: Juan Pablo Letelier
- In office 15 May 1973 – 11 September 1973
- Preceded by: José Manuel Isla
- Succeeded by: 1973 coup d'état

Ambassador of Chile to the United Kingdom
- In office 11 March 2006 – 11 March 2010
- President: Michelle Bachelet

Personal details
- Born: 14 August 1936 Santiago, Chile
- Died: 30 June 2021 (aged 84) Santiago, Chile
- Party: Christian Democratic Party (1957–)
- Other political affiliations: National Falange
- Spouse: Gloria Orb
- Children: 2
- Parent(s): Rafael Moreno; Juana Rojas
- Education: Pontifical Catholic University of Chile; University of Illinois Chicago
- Occupation: Politician
- Profession: Agronomist

Rafael Moreno Rojas (14 August 1936 – 30 June 2021) was a Chilean politician who served as a Senator and as Ambassador of Chile to the United Kingdom between 2006 and 2010.

Agricultural engineer and politician of the Christian Democratic Party. He served as Senator for the 9th Constituency, O'Higgins Region, between 1998 and 2006, and for the Fifth Provincial Grouping of O'Higgins and Colchagua, O'Higgins Region, between 1972 and 1973.

== Biography ==
=== Family and youth ===
He was born in Santiago on 14 August 1936. He is the son of Rafael Moreno and Juana Rojas.

He married Gloria Orb Castellano. He has two children: Rafael and Pablo.

=== Professional career ===
He completed his primary education at the Colegio de los Padres Franceses and his secondary education in Santiago at the Instituto de Humanidades Luis Campino and the Instituto Nacional. He entered the Faculty of Agronomy of the Pontifical Catholic University of Chile, where he graduated as an agricultural engineer in December 1958, presenting the thesis “Land-use intensity according to the size of agricultural holdings in Chile”.

In 1959, he received a scholarship to pursue postgraduate studies in Agricultural Economics at the University of Illinois, United States, obtaining a Master of Science degree in June 1960 with the thesis “A plan for Agrarian Reform: how it could be applied in Chile”.

In the professional field, he practiced his profession at the Economic Research Center of the Pontifical Catholic University of Chile. After returning from his scholarship, he served as head of planning in the Department of Agricultural Economics of the Ministry of Agriculture between 1960 and 1961, during the government of President Jorge Alessandri. That same year, he became Engineer-Economist in charge of agricultural projects at the Technical Cooperation Service, holding the position until 1964, when he was appointed Executive Vice President of the Agrarian Reform Corporation (CORA), responsible for the planning and implementation of Agrarian Reform in Chile, a position he held until 1970.

During the military regime of Augusto Pinochet, he worked abroad as a consultant for the World Bank and the Inter-American Institute of Agricultural Sciences of the OAS between 1974 and 1978. From that year until 1986, he served as Director of the Division of Human Resources, Institutions, and Agrarian Reform of the Food and Agriculture Organization of the United Nations (FAO) in Rome, Italy. There, between 1981 and 1989, he participated as organizer and president of World Food Day. In the same city, he served as FAO Assistant Director-General, first in charge of the Economic and Social Department between 1986 and 1989, and from that year until 1993 as Regional Representative for Latin America and the Caribbean, where he was responsible for organizing aid to Chile in projects financed by the World Bank.

== Political career ==
He began his political activities during his university years, joining the Falange Nacional in Santiago's 7th district in 1950. In 1953, he was appointed president of the Youth, and in 1954 became head of the University Falange, first at the Faculty of Agronomy of his university and between 1955 and 1956 at the Pontifical Catholic University of Chile.

In 1957, he joined the Christian Democratic Party as a student militant and that same year, by universal election, served as national head of the University Christian Democracy and secretary general of the National Union of Students of Chile. Between 1957 and 1964, he was a national councilor of the party, and between 1958 and 1962 of its Youth. In 1958, he was national university head of the presidential campaign of Eduardo Frei Montalva. Between 1961 and 1962, he served as national director of the party's Technical Department. From that year until 1964, he was reelected national president of the party's Youth and president of the Latin American Christian Democratic Youth (JUDCA). In 1964, he founded and became the first national director of the party's Peasant Department and a member of the National Command of Eduardo Frei Montalva's presidential campaign.

Around 1970, he served as head of the Action Fronts of the presidential campaign of Radomiro Tomic, acting as coordinator of the Workers’, Women's, Peasants’, Youth, and Neighborhood Fronts.

Since graduating from university, he has participated in numerous Christian Democratic congresses. In 1961, he was appointed delegate of the Chilean Christian Democratic Party to the World Congress of International Christian Democracy, and in 1963 he organized and presided over the First Ideological Congress of the Christian Democratic Youth in Chile. In 1961, he traveled to Mexico as a delegate to the World Conference on Agricultural Economics, and in 1964 participated in the Agrarian Reform Conference at the Congress of the Latin American Peasant Federation in Lima, Peru.

In 1971, he served as head of the party's electoral campaign for the municipal elections. During the military regime, he was national secretary of his party between 1974 and 1976, working toward its rearticulation in clandestinity. Between 1971 and 1978, he was a member of the National Board of the Christian Democratic Party. Between 1976 and 1979, he served as first national vice president of the party, and between 1980 and 1989 represented it at international congresses and meetings of World Christian Democracy.

=== Return to democracy ===
With the return to democracy, in 1991 he chaired the drafting commission of the Ideological Congress document of the Chilean Christian Democratic Party, and in 1992 chaired the Natural Resources and Environment Commission of the party's Ideological Congress. Between 1994 and 1997, he served as a national councilor of the party, and in 1996 was appointed by the National Board as a member of the Political Committee of the Municipal Campaign. Between 1997 and 1998, he served as National Secretary of the party by universal election.

Between 1994 and 1996, he was appointed councilor and vice president, representing the President of the Republic, of the Chilean Agency for International Cooperation during the government of President Eduardo Frei Ruiz-Tagle. In 1994, he was appointed president of the First World Congress of Agricultural Professionals. Between 1994 and 1998, he served as councilor of the Institute of Rural Education (IER Chile), assuming its presidency for two years starting in 1996.

After his term in the Senate, he was appointed Ambassador of Chile to the United Kingdom between 2006 and 2010, during the government of President Michelle Bachelet.
