= Álvaro Corbalán =

Chilean military officer

- Born: Álvaro Julio Federico Corbalán Castilla; Santiago, Chile
- Education: Instituto Nacional General José Miguel Carrera
- Children: 10
- Status: Incarcerated
- Criminal charges: Crimes against humanity
- Penalty: Life imprisonment

Details
- Imprisoned at: Punta Peuco Prison

Álvaro Julio Federico Corbalán Castilla is a retired Chilean major general and convicted murderer who belonged to the National Information Center (Central Nacional de Informaciones, CNI), an organization associated with political repression and torture during the military dictatorship in Chile, led by Augusto Pinochet between 1973 and 1990. He is currently serving a sentence for violation of human rights in the Punta Peuco Prison.

== Biography ==
Álvaro Corbalán studied at the National Institute and at the age of 14 he entered the Military School of Santiago. In 1971, he took a course at the School of the Americas. Before the military coup, he was in the Military Intelligence Service; he was then assigned to the Military Intelligence Service until 1980. Later on, he was transferred to the National Information Center (Central Nacional de Informaciones, CNI), and became director of the Joint Command, belonging to the Chilean Army, and commander of the Borgoño Barracks, where he was in charge of the Anti-Subversive Division. His name was associated with the so-called Operation Albania and the murder of the leader of the Unique Central of Workers of Chile (Central Única de Trabajadores de Chile, CUT) Tucapel Jiménez, among other cases.

Álvaro Corbalán used information networks at all levels of public activity. He also took advantage of his high position to get into show business circles; For he was a lover of the Spanish star Maripepa Nieto - with whose hand she would stroll through bars like Conffetti, located on Apoquindo Avenue, which has been described as "a favorite among hard Pinochetists, whose owner was Patricia Maldonado's husband".

Corbalán was a member of the National Advance political party, of which he became president between August and November 1989.

=== Convictions ===
Corbalán was convicted of a series of crimes related to the violation of human rights, including taking part in Operation Albania, along with the murders of:

- Tucapel Jiménez, syndicalist leader and militant of the Radical Party.
- Juan Alegría Mundaca, carpenter.
- Paulina Aguirre Tobar, militant of the Revolutionary Left Movement (Movimiento de Izquierda Revolucionaria, MIR).
- José Carrasco Tapia, journalist and fellow MIR militant.
- Enzo Muñoz Arévalo
- Héctor Sobarzo Núñez
- Juan Manuel Varas Silva
- Ana Delgado Tapia
- Julián Peña Maltés, militant of the Manuel Rodríguez Patriotic Front (Frente Patriótico Manuel Rodríguez, FPMR).
- Alejandro Pinochet Arenas, fellow FPMR militant.
- Manuel Sepúlveda Sánchez, fellow FPMR militant.
- Gonzalo Fuenzalida Navarrete, fellow FPMR militant.
- Julio Muñoz Otárola, fellow FPMR militant.

His sentences - 100 years in prison along a lifelong sentence - prevented him from attending the funerals of his mother Marta Castilla Geisse, who died on October 9, 2015. He was first held in a military compound, but he was transferred to the Punta Peuco prison in November 2004, from which he was transferred to the High Security Prison of Santiago in November 2015, but, after filing a protection appeal, he managed to have him returned to his former prison on January 1, 2017.

Álvaro Corbalán is the author of the book Anecdotes of my General: those that I lived… and those that were told to me. Journalists Daniel Campusano, Macarena Chinni, Constanza González and Felipe Robledo wrote The Night Owner, work in which they went over Corbalán's life.

Corbalán had an artistic streak that, according to him, he had inherited from his mother, the author of some poems and a soloist on piano. He plays guitar and piano, and, while in prison, composed some songs, such as the "Song for the reencounter" (Canción por el reencuentro) or "Anthem of Punta Peuco" (Himno de Punta Peuco). In an interview in the late 1980s, he claimed to have signed a contract in 1974 with the extinct music label Odeón to record two albums. "However, higher responsibilities kept me away from that activity," Corbalán explained. Corbalán. At the time of the military dictatorship, he released a cassette with the director of Horacio Saavedra orchestra.

In the second season of the television series Los archivos del cardenal, actor Roberto Farías was inspired by Corbalán for his character, Marcelo Alarcón, for which "he created a whole ritual in which he put on [Corbalán's] favorite perfume", Halston Z14. He also studied recordings and chronicles of said ex-military and spoke with people who knew him.

His wife is the Argentine Silvia López, whom he met while in prison and with whom he had several children.

== Human rights violations ==
Supreme Court rulings
Date of the ruling	Crime	Victims	Sentence (in years)
19 July 2000	Homicide	Juan Alegría Mundaca	Life sentence
30 April 2004	Homicide	Lisandro Sandoval Torres	10
20 July 2005	Homicide	Paulina Aguirre Tobar	5
30 December 2006	Homicide	José Carrasco Tapia	16
8 September 2014	Homicide	Enzo Muñoz Arévalo, Héctor Sobarzo Núñez, Juan Manuel Varas Silva, and Ana Delgado Tapia	7
22 March 2017	Kidnappings	Julián Peña Maltés, Alejandro Pinochet Arenas, Manuel Sepúlveda Sánchez, Gonzalo Fuenzalida Navarrete, and Julio Muñoz Otárola	15
