= La Cutufa =

Chilean finance syndicate

La Cutufa was an illegal Chilean clandestine finance syndicate (dubbed after an official's dog) that offered investors, mostly officers of the Chilean army, tax-free interest rates of 20% a month. It was created by Major Patricio Castro Muñoz, a high-ranking official of the CNI (the Chilean secret police during the last 13 years of the Pinochet dictatorship), and was active from 1984 to 1989. After a dissatisfied investor, restaurant impresario Aurelio Sichel, was murdered by CNI agents, 4 generals and 16 officers were cashiered and 200 sanctioned. According to the claimers, during its five years of operation, the army gang handled $50 million.

== See also ==
- Chile under Pinochet
- Hugo Salas Wenzel
