= Punta Peuco Prison =

Prison in Tiltil, Chile

Coordinates: 33.1150°S 70.8169°W

Map of the Punta Peuco Prison, Til Til, Chile

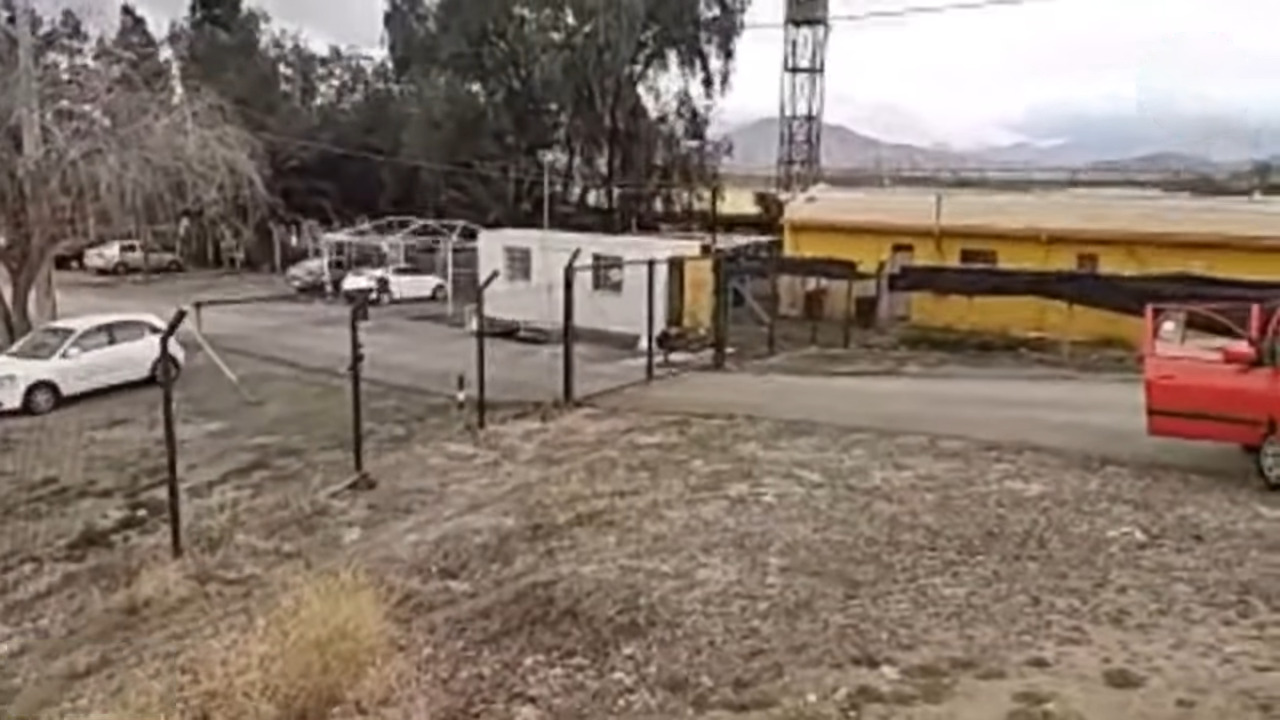
Entrance of Punta Peuco Prison

Punta Peuco Prison (Penal de Punta Peuco), officially Centro de Detención Preventiva y Cumplimiento Penitenciario Especial Punta Peuco, is a prison located in the municipality of Tiltil, Santiago Metropolitan Region. Punta Peuco is a special facility specifically built in 1995 for individuals convicted by the Chilean judiciary of crimes against humanity and human rights abuses during the military dictatorship of Chile (1973–90). The judiciary uses the old criminal procedure system originated in 1906 for these cases, without the guarantees introduced with the reform carried out between 2000 and 2005.

The prison, which holds approximately 130 inmates, is considerably more modern than a standard Chilean jail. After considerable military protest and insubordination in response to the sentences against violations of the human rights, Punta Peuco was built within a military community, but the prison is administered by the Chilean Gendarmerie, the national prison service, similar to the country's other prisons.

In June and October 1995, convicted Caravan of Death commanders Manuel Contreras and Pedro Espinoza were incarcerated at the prison, respectively. 22 July 1995 some 1,500 people, many of them members of the army, attended a rally outside the Punta Peuco prison in solidarity for Brigadier Espinoza. Inmates have included Manuel Contreras, Raúl Iturriaga, Miguel Krassnoff, Pedro Espinoza and Marcelo Moren Brito.

Protests regarding the Punta Peuco Prison

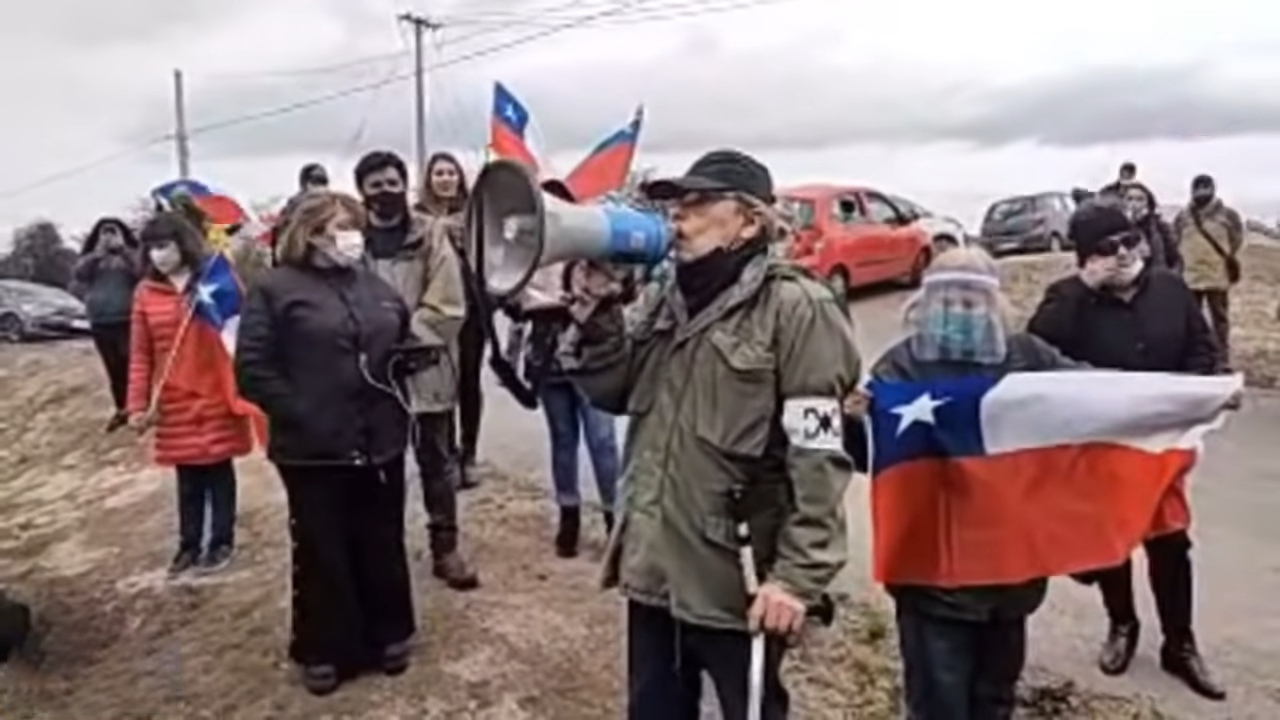
Protest demanding the liberation of the prisoners from the Punta Peuco prison in September 2021.

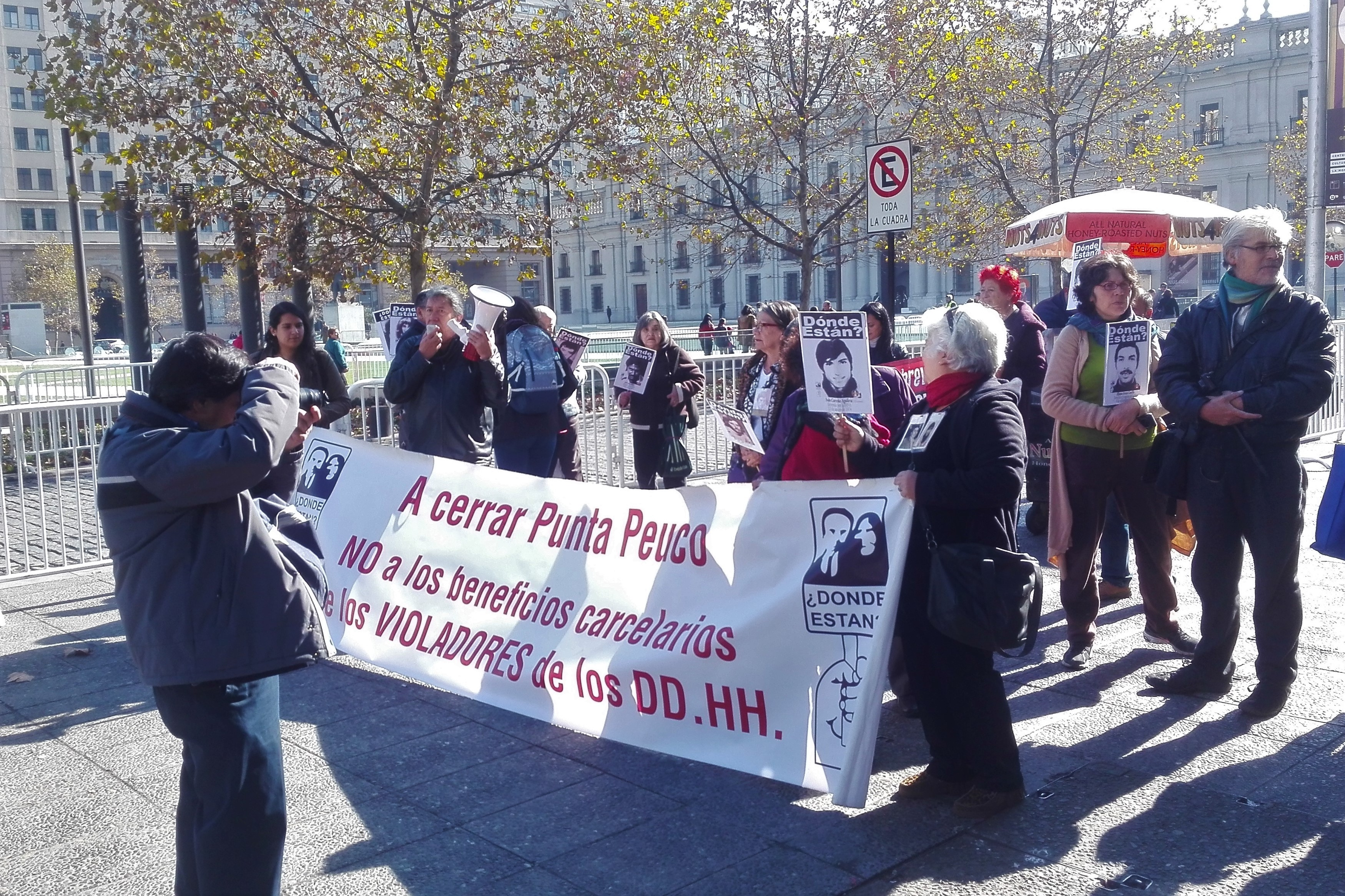
Protest demanding the closure of the Punta Peuco prison in May 2017.

Between 2020 and 2021, during the height of the COVID-19 pandemic, the prison suffered an outbreak. Nearly 70 percent of the inmates (~80 out of 110+) fell ill. Five of them died:

- General Héctor Orozco, 93, died on 26 October 2020. Since 2017, he had been serving a 10-year sentence for his role in the murders of two left-wing activists.
- Colonel Jaime García Zamorano, 85, died on 3 September 2021. Since 2014, he had been serving a 7-year sentence for his role in the massacre of 18 peasants.
- Miguel Estay Reyno, 68, died on 4 September 2021. Since 1995, he had been serving a life sentence for his role in the kidnapping and murder of three communists.
- Air Force commander Luis Enrique Campos Poblete, 82, died on 5 September 2021. Since 2017, he had been serving a 17-year sentence for murder of a leftist and the kidnapping of another leftist.
- Marco Antonio Bustos Carrasco, 61, died on 11 September 2021. Since 2017, he had been serving a 5-year sentence for his complicity in the kidnappings of five leftists who were later murdered.

Punta Peuco Prison has long been criticised for giving its inmates preferential treatment, with comforts like tennis courts, barbecues, a library, and a TV room. In 2025, the Chilean government announced it would merge the prison into the regular system to ease overcrowding and show that all prisoners will now be treated equally, with placements based on security needs, not privilege.

== Inmates ==
- Manuel Contreras
- Pedro Espinoza
- Álvaro Corbalán
- Miguel Krassnoff
- Raúl Iturriaga
- Jorge del Río
- Marcelo Moren Brito
- José Zara Holger
- César Manríquez
- Hugo Salas Wenzel
- Carlos Herrera Jiménez
- Guillermo González Betancourt
- Juan Fuentes Castro
- Claudio Salazar Fuentes
- Alejandro Saez Mardones
- Patricio Zamora Rodríguez
- Manuel Muñoz Gamboa
- Fernando Valdés Cid
- Fernando Torres Silva
