= Marcelo Moren Brito =

Chilean military personnel (1935–2015)

Moren Brito

Marcelo Luis Manuel Moren Brito (July 27, 1935 – September 11, 2015) was a Chilean retired Army colonel and former agent of the Dirección de Inteligencia Nacional (DINA), the defunct Chilean secret police, during the Pinochet dictatorship from 1973 to 1990. During the rule of Dictator Augusto Pinochet, Moren Brito was the chief of operations at DINA, as well as the head of the Villa Grimaldi, DINA's detention center in Peñalolén, where thousands of political prisoners were interrogated and tortured. He was a member of a death squad of Chilean Army officers who carried out the 1973 Caravan of Death, in which at least 75 individuals in military custody were executed, including the singer Víctor Jara.

Moren Brito was accused of the widespread abductions, disappearances, murder and the torture of political opponents of the Pinochet regime. La Tercera, the daily Chilean newspaper, wrote that Moren Briten was "associated with some of the cruelest actions of repression against dissidents of the military government of Augusto Pinochet."

Moren Brito was convicted of crimes against humanity and sentenced to more than 300 years in prison. He was incarcerated for life at Punta Peuco Prison, which was constructed in 1995 specifically for individuals convicted of human rights abuses.

He died from multiple organ failure at Hospital Militar de Santiago, where he had been admitted earlier in the week due to declining health, on September 11, 2015, at the age of 80.
