= Orlando Letelier =

Chilean economist, politician and diplomat (1932–1976)

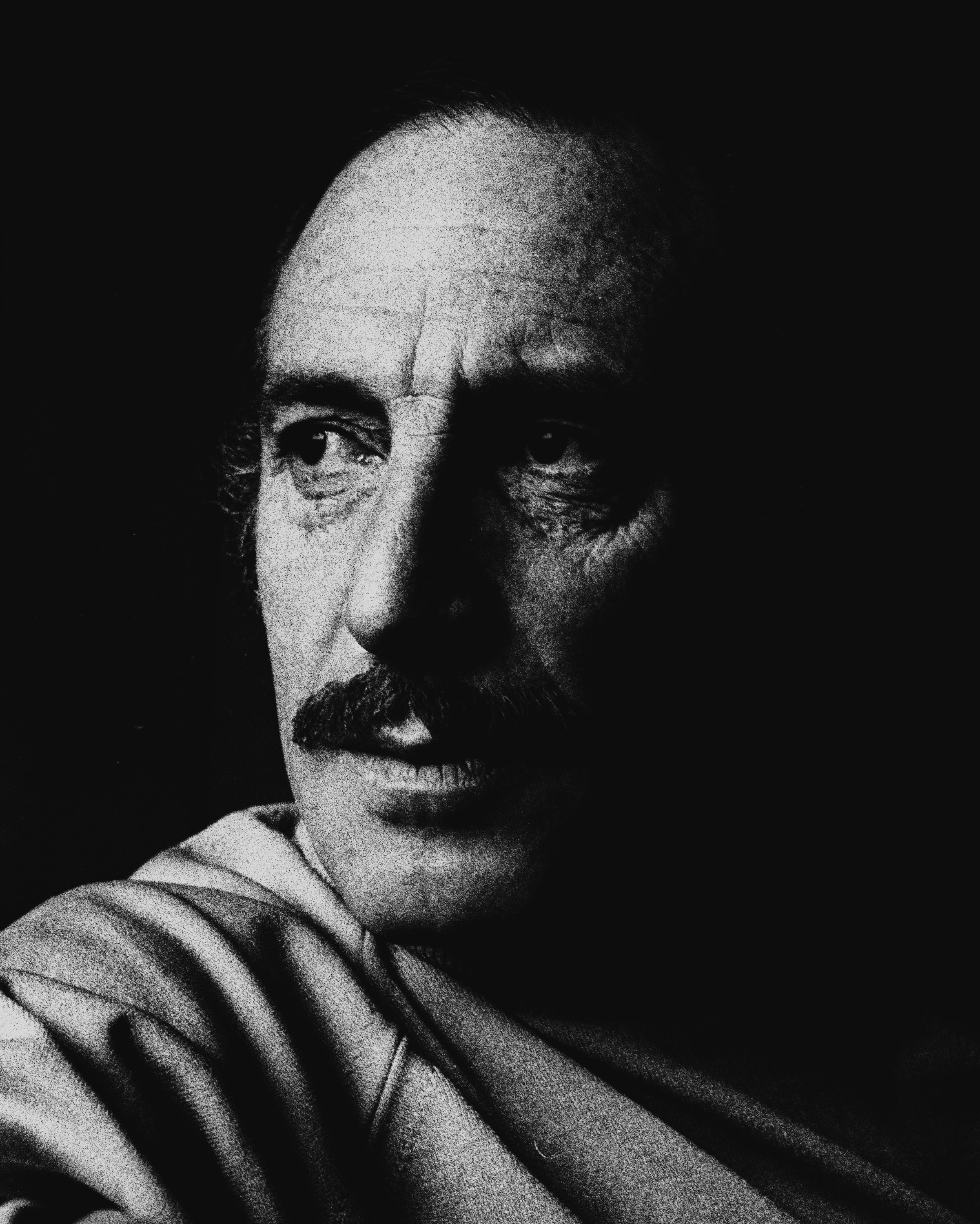
- Letelier in 1976

Minister of National Defense of Chile
- In office 23 August 1973 – 11 September 1973
- President: Salvador Allende
- Preceded by: Carlos Prats
- Succeeded by: Patricio Carvajal

Foreign Affairs Minister
- In office 22 May 1973 – 9 August 1973
- President: Salvador Allende
- Preceded by: Clodomiro Almeyda
- Succeeded by: Clodomiro Almeyda

Personal details
- Born: Sergio Orlando Letelier del Solar; 13 April 1932 Temuco, Chile
- Died: 21 September 1976 (aged 44) Washington, D.C., US
- Cause of death: Assassination by car bomb
- Party: Socialist Party of Chile
- Spouse: Isabel Margarita Morel Gumucio (m. 1955)
- Children: 4
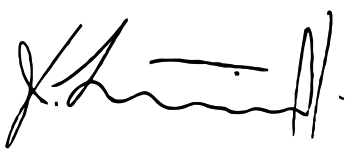
- Signature

Marcos Orlando Letelier del Solar (Note: Spanish pronunciation: [maɾkos oɾˌlando leteˌljeɾ del soˈlaɾ]) (13 April 1932 – 21 September 1976) was a Chilean Marxist and diplomat during the presidency of Salvador Allende. A member of the Socialist Party of Chile, he fled from the military dictatorship of General Augusto Pinochet, and accepted several academic positions in Washington D.C. after his exile from Chile. In 1976, agents of Dirección de Inteligencia Nacional (DINA), the Pinochet regime's secret police, killed him in Washington by a car bomb. The agents had been working in collaboration with members of the Coordination of United Revolutionary Organizations, an anti-Castro militant group.

== Background ==
Sergio Orlando Letelier del Solar was born in Temuco, Chile, in South-Central Chile, the youngest child of Orlando Letelier Ruiz and Inés del Solar. He studied at the Instituto Nacional in Santiago. At 16, he was accepted as a cadet at the Chilean Military Academy, where he completed his secondary studies. Later, he abandoned a military career. He did not finish college and never received a university degree. In 1955, he joined the recently formed Copper Office (Departamento del Cobre, now CODELCO) and worked there until 1959 as a research analyst in the copper industry.

On 17 December 1955, Letelier married Isabel Margarita Morel Gumucio and they had four children: Cristián, José, Francisco, and Juan Pablo.

In 1959 Letelier was fired from the Copper Office, ostensibly for having supported Salvador Allende's unsuccessful second presidential campaign. The Letelier family left for Venezuela, where Orlando Letelier became a copper consultant to the Finance Ministry.

== Political career ==
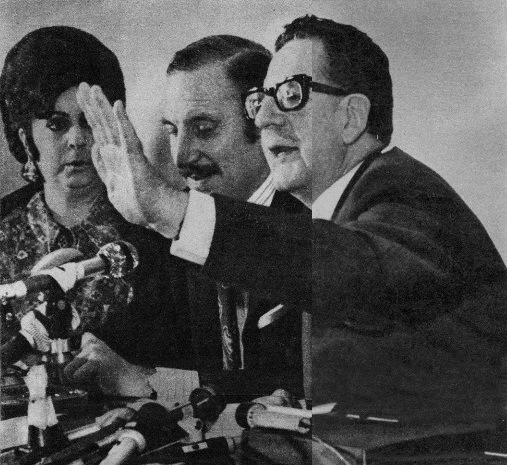
Letelier (middle) and Salvador Allende

While at university, Letelier became a student representative in the University of Chile's Student Union. In 1959, he joined the Chilean Socialist Party (PS). In 1971, President Allende appointed him ambassador to the United States. His specific mission was to advocate in defense of the Chilean nationalization of copper, which had replaced the private ownership model favored by the U.S. government.

In 1973, Letelier was recalled to Chile and served successively as Minister of Foreign Affairs, the Interior, and Defense. In the coup d'état of 11 September 1973, he was the first high-ranking member of the Allende administration to be arrested. He was held for twelve months in various concentration camps and suffered severe torture: first at the Tacna Regiment, then at the Military Academy. Later he was sent for eight months to a political prison on Dawson Island; from there he was transferred to the basement of the Air Force War Academy, and finally to Riotoque, a concentration camp north of Valparaíso, Chile. After international diplomatic pressure, especially from Diego Arria, then Governor of Distrito Federal of Venezuela, he was released in September 1974 on the condition that he immediately leave Chile.

After his release, he and his family moved to Caracas, Venezuela, but later went to the United States on the recommendation of American writer Saul Landau. In 1975, Letelier moved to Washington D.C., where he became senior fellow of the Washington, D.C.–based Institute for Policy Studies, a think tank in which Landau was involved. Letelier became director of the Amsterdam-based Transnational Institute and taught at the School of International Service of the American University in Washington, D.C.

Letelier wrote several articles criticizing the "Chicago Boys", a group of South American economists trained at the University of Chicago by Milton Friedman and Arnold Harberger who returned to their home countries to promote and advise leaders on the benefits of a free-market economy. This economic model was used to great effect in Chile where General Pinochet sought to dismantle the country's socialist economic system and replace it with a free-market economy. Letelier believed that in a resource-driven economy such as Chile, allowing markets to operate freely simply guaranteed the movement of wealth from the lower and middle classes to the monopolists and financial speculators. He soon became the leading voice of the Chilean resistance, preventing several loans (especially from Europe) from being awarded to the Chilean government. On 10 September 1976, he was stripped of his Chilean nationality.

== Death ==
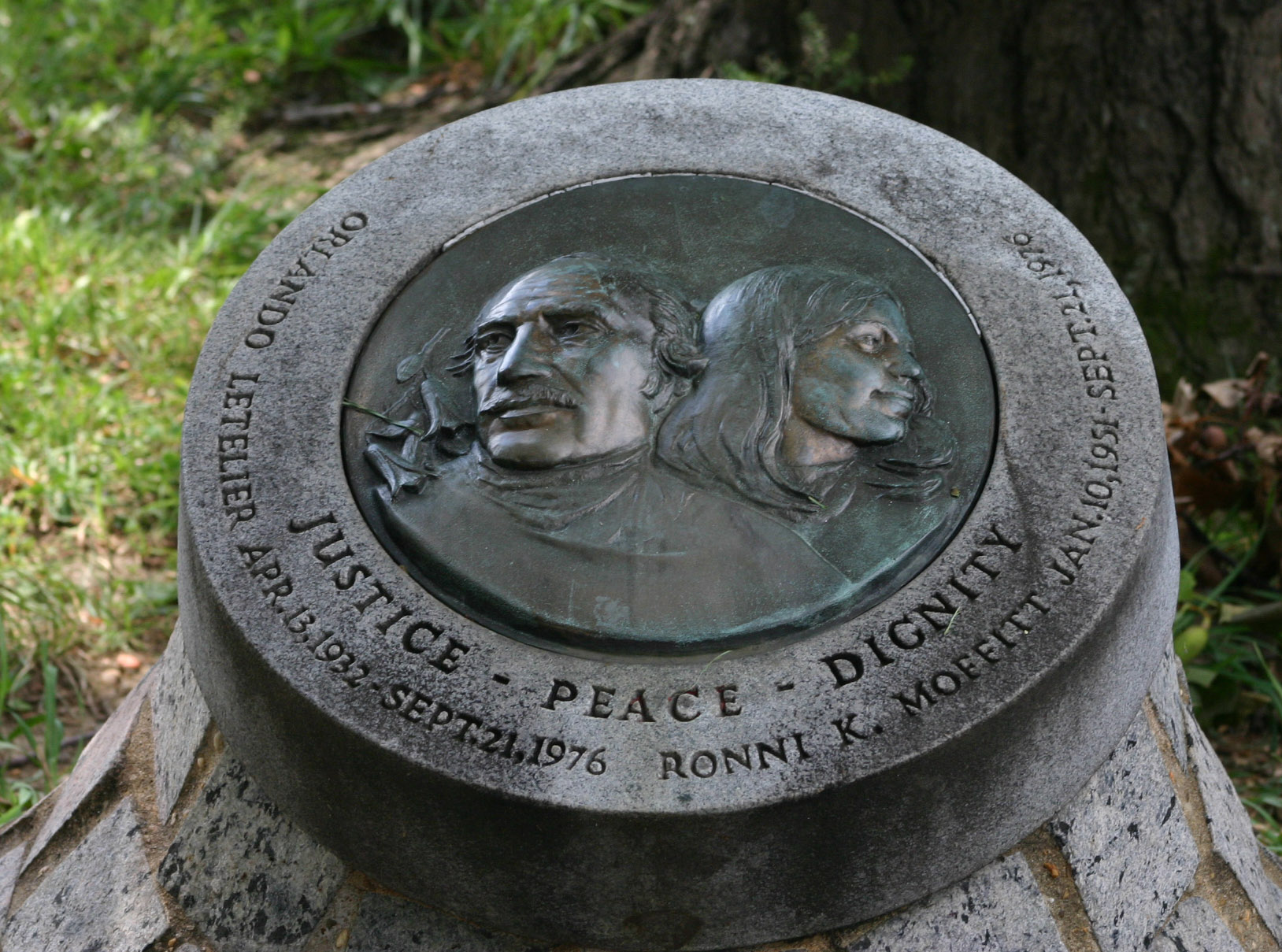
Memorial on Sheridan Circle, Washington, D.C.

Letelier was killed by a car bombing on 21 September 1976 in Sheridan Circle in Washington, D.C., along with his American secretary and interpreter, Ronni Karpen Moffitt.

Moffitt's husband, Michael Moffitt, was injured but survived. Several people were prosecuted for and convicted of the murder. Among them were Michael Townley, a U.S. expatriate working for DINA, General Manuel Contreras, former head of DINA, and Brigadier Pedro Espinoza, also formerly of DINA. Townley was convicted in the United States in 1978 and served 62 months in prison for the murder. He is now free as a participant in the United States Federal Witness Protection Program. Contreras and Espinoza were convicted in Chile in 1993.

=== Investigation ===
During the FBI investigation into the assassination, documents in Letelier's possession were copied and leaked to journalists Rowland Evans and Robert Novak of The Washington Times and Jack Anderson by the FBI before being returned to his widow. The documents purportedly show Letelier was working with Eastern Bloc intelligence agencies for a decade and coordinating his activities with the surviving political leadership of the Popular Unity coalition exiled in East Berlin, East Germany. The FBI suspected that these individuals had been recruited by the Stasi. Documents in the briefcase showed that Letelier had maintained contact with Salvador Allende's daughter, Beatriz Allende, who was married to Cuban DGI station chief Luis Fernandez Ona.

=== Funeral ===
Letelier's funeral was held at St. Matthew's Cathedral in Washington D.C. and then there was a march to the site of the car-bombing at Sheridan Circle on Massachusetts Avenue, where folksinger Joan Baez sang in honor of Letelier. Several thousand U.S. citizens and Chilean exiles took part. Diego Arria again intervened by bringing Letelier's body to Caracas for burial, where Arria remained until 1994 after the end of Pinochet's rule.

General Augusto Pinochet, who died on 10 December 2006, was never brought to trial for the murders, despite some evidence implicating him as having ordered them. However, in a letter dated March 14, 1976, Townley discussed plans for the assassination and noted that he in fact received the assassination order from Manuel Contreras's deputy Pedro Espinoza. Townley also later claimed he conducted his operations, including the assassination of Letelier, by "following orders from General Contreras." After the assassination, the United States cut military aid to Chile, and took a stance of 'unobtrusiveness' within the country.

== Aftermath ==
After the death of Pinochet in December 2006, the Institute for Policy Studies (IPS), for which both Letelier and Moffitt worked, called for the release of all classified documents relating to the Letelier–Moffitt assassination.

According to the IPS, the Clinton administration de-classified more than 16,000 documents relating to Chile, but withheld documents relating to the Letelier-Moffitt assassination in Washington on the grounds that they were associated with an ongoing investigation. The IPS said the Clinton administration had re-opened the investigation into the Letelier-Moffitt murders and sent agents to Chile to gather additional evidence that Pinochet had authorized the crime. The former Chilean Secret Police Chief, Manuel Contreras, who was convicted for his role in the crime in 1993, later pointed the finger at his superiors, claiming that all relevant orders had come from Pinochet.

== Subsequent disclosures ==
A US State Department document made available by the National Security Archive on 10 April 2010 reveals that a démarche protesting Pinochet's Operation Condor assassination program was proposed and sent on 23 August 1976 to U.S. diplomatic missions in Uruguay, Argentina, and Chile to be delivered to their host governments but later rescinded on 16 September 1976 by Henry Kissinger, after concerns were raised by US ambassadors assigned there of both personal safety and a likely diplomatic contretemps. Five days later, the Letelier assassination took place.

Documents released in 2015 revealed a CIA report dated 28 April 1978, which claimed that the agency by then had knowledge that Pinochet ordered the murders. The report said, "Contreras told a confidante he authorized the assassination of Letelier on orders from Pinochet." A State Department document also referred to eight separate CIA reports from around the same date, each sourced to "extremely sensitive informants" who provided evidence of Pinochet's direct involvement in ordering the assassination and in directing the subsequent cover-up. However, letters written by Letelier assassin Michael Townley, and which were published by the National Security Archive in November 2023, implied otherwise and instead linked Townley, DINA head Manuel Contreras and Contreras' deputy Pedro Esponiza to the assassination order. Townley said in his March 1978 "confession" letter that while he bore responsibility, he carried out his DINA operations on order on Contreras, writing, “It is obvious that they intend to use the fact that I am a foreigner, to attempt to divert the responsibility of the Chilean government, and also to stop me from talking about the other things that I have done for DINA following orders from General Contreras."

In a U.S. Department of Justice affidavit from August 1991, U.S. Justice Department attorney Eric B. Marcy noted that numerous confession letters were obtained from Mariana Callejas between 1982 and 1990 (she was a writer), and that while the Pinochet regime employed Operación Mascarada to cover up its role in Letelier and Montiff's assassination, the people in the Pinochet regime who Townley sought protection from, were in fact Contreras and Espinoza. In one letter, Townley said that he received the order to assassinate Letelier from Espinoza in March 1976 and, after the assassination was carried out, disclosed details on how he in fact was the one who recruited the assassination team which consisted of American Cuban exiles after entering the U.S. while in possession of phony visas he obtained in Paraguay. In another letter, Townley even accused Contreas of deceiving Pinochet about the assassination details.

During the tenure of Richard D. Downie at the William J. Perry Center for Hemispheric Defense Studies, a U.S. Southern Command educational institution at the National Defense University in Washington D.C., the role of Jaime Garcia Covarrubias, a Chilean professor who was head of counterintelligence for DINA—Pinochet’s state terrorism organization—in the 1970s, in the torture and murder of seven detainees was revealed inside the center. The case was first brought to Downie's attention in early 2008 by Center assistant professor Martin Edwin Andersen, a senior staff member who earlier, as a senior advisor for policy planning at the Criminal Division of the U.S. Department of Justice, was the first national security whistleblower to receive the U.S Office of Special Counsel's "Public Servant Award." By 2023, the time of the fiftieth anniversary of the far-right coup, Garcia Covarrubias was serving life imprisonment for his role in three separate cases of the murders of nine unarmed people, being found guilty in the case involving four university students and others. In an October 1987 investigative report in The Nation, Andersen broke the story of how, in a June 1976 meeting in the Hotel Carrera in Santiago, Kissinger gave the bloody military junta in neighboring Argentina the "green light" for their own dirty "war."

On 22 November 2023, Michael Townley confession documents were published by the National Security Archive. Included among the documents were letters from March 1976 and March 1978 where Townley personally detailed his role in planning and undergoing Letelier's assassination. Townley personally implicated himself in earlier letters saying that Espinoza was the one who gave him the order to go through with the assassination and Contreras as being the one whom he took order from when he took part in missions for DINA. The August 1991 U.S. Department of Justice affidavit also said that Townley in fact prepared his confession letters prior to his departure from Chile "in order to protect him from the fugitives Manuel Contreras and Pedro Espinoza." In a separate letter which Townley sent to Manuel Contreras on March 1, 1978, he referred to Contreras as "Don Manuel" and made clear his belief that Contreras had not “let his Excellency [Pinochet] know the truth about this case” when he brought up Letelier's assassination.

== In culture ==
The years leading up to the death of Orlando Letelier and the terrorist attack which ended his life in Washington D.C. are one of the central themes of the novel 1976 by Jorge Majfud, an Uruguayan author.

== See also ==
- Journalist Robert Novak's involvement in the Orlando Letelier assassination
- List of political scandals in Chile
- Military dictatorship of Chile (1973–1990)
- National Security Archive
- State terrorism
- Terrorism in the United States

== General and cited references ==
- Dinges, John, and Landau, Saul. Assassination on Embassy Row (London, 1981) ISBN 0-07-016998-5, (McGraw-Hill, 1981)
- Dinges, John. The Condor Years (The New Press: 2004) ISBN 1-56584-764-4
- Hitchens, Christopher, The Trial of Henry Kissinger, (Verso Books: 2001) ISBN 1-85984-631-9
- Taylor Branch and Eugene M Propper Labyrinth (Viking Press 1983, Penguin Books 1983, ISBN 0-14-006683-7)

Political offices
| Preceded by Clodomiro Almeyda | Minister of Foreign Affairs; 1973 | Succeeded by Clodomiro Almeyda |
| Preceded by Carlos Briones | Minister of the Interior; 1973 | Succeeded by Carlos Briones |
| Preceded by Carlos Prats | Minister of Defense; 1973 | Succeeded by Patricio Carvajal |
