= Juan Pablo Letelier =

Chilean politician

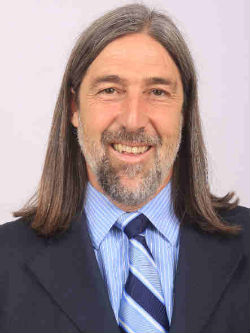

Member of the Senate
- In office 11 March 2006 – 11 March 2022
- Preceded by: Rafael Moreno Rojas
- Constituency: 9th Circumscription

Member of the Chamber of Deputies
- In office 11 March 1990 – 11 March 2006
- Preceded by: Creation of the district
- Succeeded by: Alejandro Sule
- Constituency: 33rd District

Personal details
- Born: 7 January 1961 (age 65) Washington, D.C., United States
- Citizenship: Chilean
- Party: Socialist Party
- Parent(s): Orlando Letelier; Isabel Margarita Morel
- Education: Georgetown University (B.Sc)
- Occupation: Politician
- Profession: Economist

Juan Pablo Letelier Morel (born 7 January 1961) is a Chilean politician and economist who was a member of the Senate of Chile.

== Early life and family ==
He was born in Santiago, Chile, on 7 January 1961. He is the son of Isabel Margarita Morel Gumucio and Orlando Letelier, who under the government of President Salvador Allende served as Extraordinary and Plenipotentiary Ambassador of Chile to the United States (1971), and later as Minister of Foreign Affairs, Minister of the Interior, and Minister of National Defense, a position he left on 11 September 1973.

Letelier was assassinated by agents of the National Intelligence Directorate (DINA) on 21 September 1976 in Washington, D.C., United States.

He is married to Marcela Briones and is the father of three children.

== Professional career ==
He completed his primary education at Saint George’s College in Santiago and his secondary education at Nido de Águilas and at Walt Whitman High School in Maryland, United States. After completing secondary school, he entered Georgetown University, where he studied economics.

He later completed a Master’s degree in Economics and International Politics at the Center for Research and Teaching in Economics (CIDE) in Mexico.

In professional terms, from 1976 he worked on the Human Rights Project at the Institute of Public Affairs in Washington, D.C.

Between 1983 and 1987, he worked as a researcher at the Latin American Institute for Transnational Studies (ILET), where he carried out a research project on border conflicts, stability, democracy, and regional political cooperation. In 1987, he became Director of Studies of the South American Peace Commission.

== Political career ==
He began his political activities in 1979, when he joined the Socialist Youth (JS). In 1981, he became a member of the leadership of the Socialist Youth in Mexico. In 1983, he returned to Chile and joined the Public Front of the Socialist Youth. He also served on the Executive Committee of the Chilean Commission for Youth Rights (CODEJU).

In 1985, he represented the Central Committee of the Socialist Party of Chile (PS) at the XXI National Conference of the Socialist Youth. At the same time, he was elected president of the Chilean delegation to the XXII World Festival of Youth.

In 1988, he represented the JS in the campaign for the No option in the 1988 Chilean presidential referendum. The following year, he was re-elected as a member of the Central Committee of the JS, joined its Political Commission, and was appointed coordinator of the Youth Movement for Democracy.

On 9 May 1990, following the cancellation of the registration of the Broad Left Socialist Party (PAIS), he joined the Socialist Party of Chile, where he served as vice president. In 1991, he was elected a member of the Central Committee of the Socialist Party and was confirmed in the position in 1993. In 1997, he was appointed head of committee and also served as treasurer of the party.

He served as a member and later president of the Human Rights Commission of the Inter-Parliamentary Union (IPU), participating in missions on five continents and acting as an international observer. In October 2019, he was elected a member of the Executive Committee of the IPU and of its Subcommittee on Finance.

In December 2005, he was elected Senator for the Ninth Senatorial Circumscription (Rancagua, O'Higgins Region), obtaining 41.50% of the valid votes.

In the 2013 parliamentary elections, he was re-elected Senator representing the Socialist Party for Circumscription No. 9, with 46.03% of the valid votes. For the 2018–2021 period, he served as a member of the Board of the Latin America and the Caribbean Group (GRULAC).
