= Hugo Salas Wenzel =

Chilean general (1935–2021)

Hugo Salas Wenzel (30 October 1935 – 11 August 2021) was a General of the Chilean Army during the dictatorship of Augusto Pinochet. In August 2007 he was the first former senior military official sentenced to life for human rights violations in Chile during the 1980s.

From 1986 to 1988 Salas was Director of the Central Nacional de Informaciones (CNI), Chile's intelligence service which succeeded the notorious DINA. During this time the organization was involved in an anti-subversion campaign known as Operación Albania; the Corpus Christi Massacre on 15–16 June 1987 was a part of the operation. Twelve members of the Manuel Rodríguez Patriotic Front (FPMR) were murdered.

Salas was forced into retirement as a result of their direct or indirect involvement in the La Cutufa-affair.

On 29 October 1999, Chilean authorities charged retired generals Salas and Humberto Leiva with the Operación Albania massacre. They accused Salas of being an author of the crime, and Leiva, CNI Subdirector in 1987, of covering up the incident.

In January 2005 Salas was sentenced to life for his role in the massacre; 14 other CNI agents were each given sentences ranging from three to five years. Following an appeal, in August 2007 the Supreme Court of Chile upheld the sentence. The families of the victims have received financial compensation from the Chilean government.

== See also ==
- La Cutufa
