= Nicolás Díaz (politician) =

Chilean politician (1929–2019)

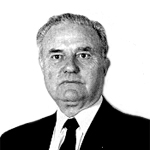

Member of the Senate of Chile
- In office 11 March 1990 – 11 March 1998
- Preceded by: District Created
- Succeeded by: Rafael Moreno Rojas
- Constituency: 9th Circumscription

Intendant of the O'Higgins Province
- In office 1970 – 3 November 1970
- President: Eduardo Frei Montalva
- Preceded by: Mario Céspedes
- Succeeded by: Wladimir Chávez

Mayor of Rancagua
- In office 21 May 1967 – 5 March 1968
- Preceded by: Patricio Mekis
- Succeeded by: Patricio Mekis
- In office 14 May 1963 – 1964
- Succeeded by: Patricio Mekis

Personal details
- Born: 10 August 1929 Rancagua, Chile
- Died: 18 October 2019 (aged 90) Rancagua, Chile
- Party: Christian Democratic Party
- Spouse: Mabel Soteras
- Children: 5
- Education: University of Chile
- Occupation: Politician
- Profession: Surgeon

Nicolás Díaz Sánchez (10 August 1929 – 18 October 2019) was a Chilean politician and cardiologist, member of the Christian Democrat Party of Chile (PDC).

Díaz Sánchez was born on August 10, 1929, in the city of Rancagua. He studied in the O'Higgins Institute of Rancagua, and afterwards he completed his higher education in the Medicine Faculty of the University of Chile, where he graduated as a surgeon in 1955.

He began his political career as regional chief of Eduardo Frei Montalva during the 1958 elections. He later joined the Christian Democrat Party of Chile, and in 1963 he was elected mayor of Rancagua, but he renounced the following year. He was elected again in 1967, but he also renounced in 1968. He was appointed Intendent of O'Higgins Region in 1970, by President Salvador Allende.

After holding several charges inside his party during the military regime, and having participated in the "No" movement during the National Plebiscite of 1988, he was elected Senator of the Chilean Republic for the VI Libertador Bernardo O'Higgins Region, an office he would hold from 1990 until 1998. Between 2004 and 2008, he was councillor of Rancagua.

He died on October 18, 2019, in Rancagua.

== Biography ==
He was born in Coinco on 10 August 1929. He was the son of Marco Díaz and Ana Sánchez. He married Mabel Soteras Irazabal, and they had five children: Rodrigo, Gonzalo, Irene, Paulina and Felipe. He died in Rancagua on 18 October 2019.

He completed his primary education at the Instituto O'Higgins of the Marist Brothers in Rancagua. He pursued higher education at the Faculty of Medicine of the University of Chile, where he obtained the degree of Medical Doctor in 1955. He specialized in cardiology.

He began his professional career at the Rancagua Hospital, where he worked for more than thirty years. He also provided medical services at the football club, Club Deportivo O’Higgins, the San Lucas Health Center, and the Carabineros Pension Fund, among other institutions. His strong vocational commitment led him to provide free medical care in clinics affiliated with the Catholic Church.

== Political career ==
His political activity began in 1958, when he was appointed regional head of the presidential campaign of Eduardo Frei Montalva. He later joined the Christian Democratic Party of Chile, eventually serving as regional vice-president. During the military government, he held various positions within his party and actively participated in the campaign for the “No” option in the 1988 plebiscite and in the Concertación.

He was elected municipal councilor and, in 1963, mayor of Rancagua, a position from which he resigned in 1964. He was again elected mayor in 1967 and resigned in 1968. During his mayoral terms, he promoted a special law granting extraordinary funds to Rancagua to commemorate the 150th anniversary of the Battle of Rancagua. These resources enabled major infrastructure projects, including the Industrial Park, a public riverside resort on the Cachapoal River, the Copper Highway (later named after President Eduardo Frei Montalva), the Free Market System, neighborhood health clinics, potable water systems, and extensive urban paving works.

In 1970, he was appointed interim Intendant of O’Higgins Province. During the military period, he remained active in political opposition efforts, participating in the Committee for Free Elections, the “No” campaign, and the Concertación of Parties for Democracy.

In the 1989 parliamentary elections, he ran for the Senate of Chile representing the Christian Democratic Party within the Concertación coalition for the 9th Senatorial District (O’Higgins Region). He was elected with the highest vote share, receiving 106,182 votes (29.68% of valid votes).

In 2004, he was elected municipal councilor of Rancagua for the 2004–2008 term, obtaining 8,605 votes (10.44%). During this period, he chaired the Health Commission of the Municipal Council. In October 2008, he decided not to seek re-election.
