= Chilean water crisis =

Water shortages in Chile since 2010

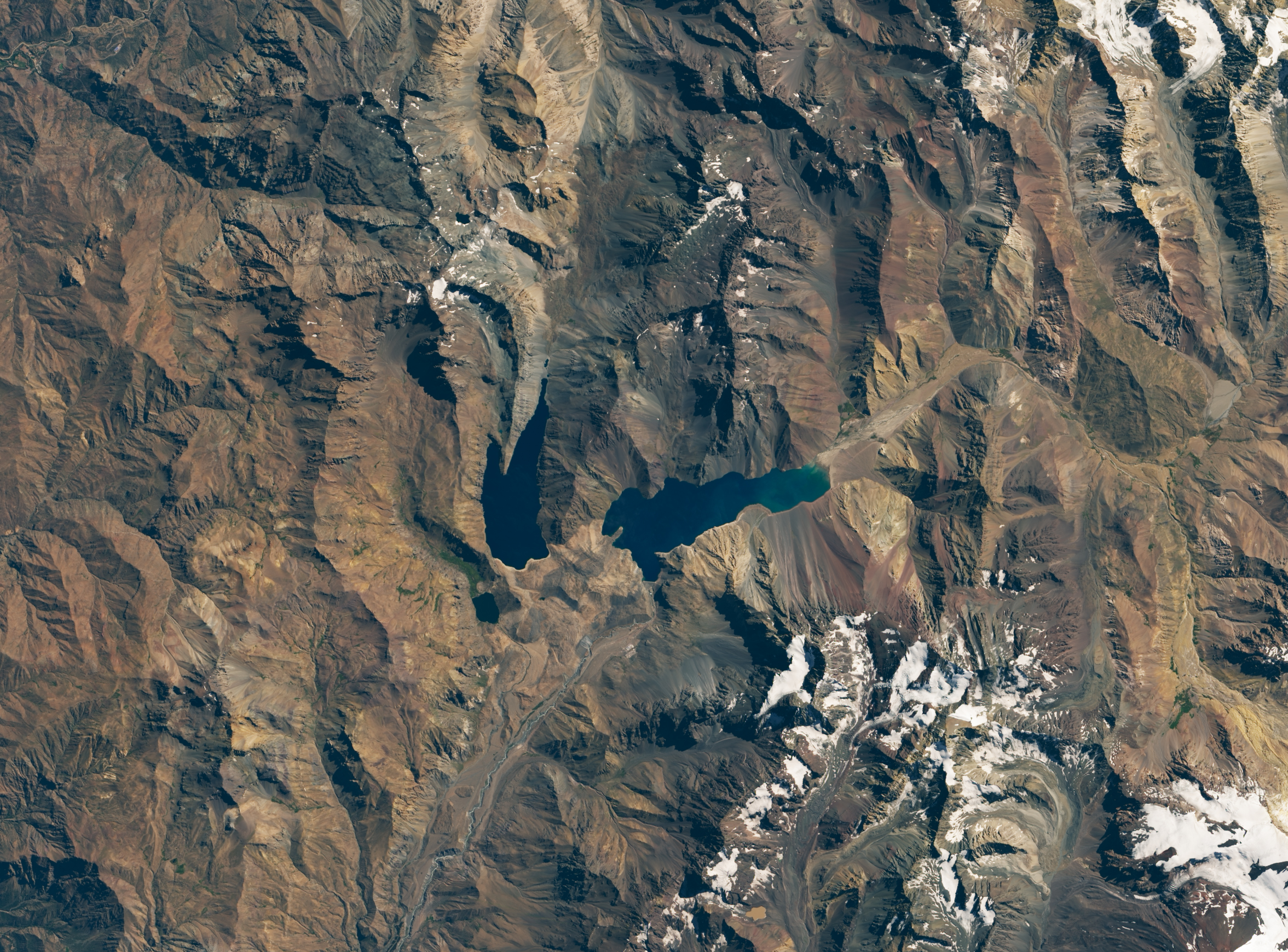
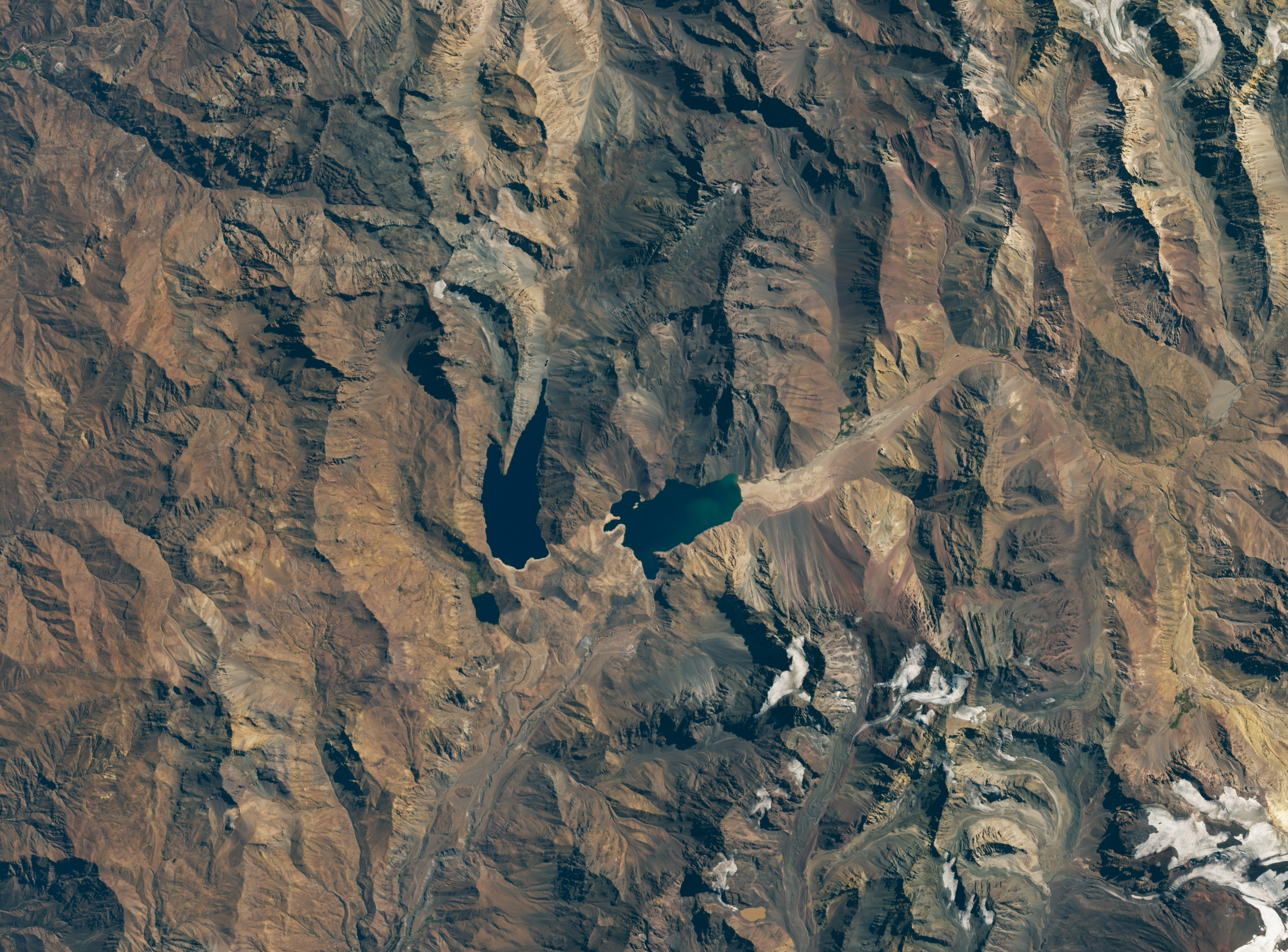
- El Yeso reservoir in 2016 (top) at about 88% capacity and in 2020 (bottom) at 40% capacity.
- Date: 2010-present
- Location: Chile
- Type: Drought
- Cause: Climate change; Ridiculously Resilient Ridge; Privatization of water
- Outcome: Tens of thousands of dead animals; Water rationing

The Chilean water crisis is a period of extreme water scarcity and drought in Chile that began in 2010 in response to climate change, agricultural practices and the existing policies established in the early 1980s. It is the longest lasting drought experienced in Chile in over 700 to 1,000 years.

The megadrought that begun in 2010 have contributed to make large swathes of Chile more prone to wildfire. In Central Chile much natural vegetation have experienced reduced chlorophyll levels and vigor as result of the megadrought.

== History ==
=== Economy and politics ===
The 1980 Constitution of Chile created under the dictatorship of Augusto Pinochet recognizes water as a private property and in 1980, his government rewrote laws regulating water, granting the sale and privatization of water in a manner similar to the stock market. The sale of water rights has been one of the primary factors that led to lower water levels in some areas. Chile's economy developed into mainly extractivism and due to the privatization of water; by 2022, forestry—representing 3% of the nation's gross domestic product—consumed 59% of Chile's water, agriculture used 37% and only 2% was allocated for human consumption.

=== Drought ===
Chile began to experience a drought in 2010 and by 2020, precipitation was 20–45% of average nationally and 10–20% of average in the area of Santiago. According to René D. Garreaud, of the University of Chile, the drought was the most extreme in the area in over 1,000 years. During the Petorca water crisis, it was found in 2011 that large agricultural companies were stealing water from water outlets of the Petorca River.

A 2018 study found that in the 2010-2014 period, nutrient values in the plumes of rivers discharging to the Pacific in Central Chile fell to half of their historic values.

By 2020, nearly 500,000 Chileans relied on water transport trucks and tens of thousands of animals died from drought. In 2021, research published by the Journal of Climate stated that a "Southern Blob" partially caused by climate change was exacerbating the drought. By 2022, Chile was ranked 16th of 164 for water stress in the world according to the University of Chile. In April 2022, Chile instituted a four-tiered water rationing plan; the second level included a public announcement, the third would lower water pressure and the most extreme level would rotate water stoppages for 24 hours.

=== Notable events ===
- 1985 – First year in modern times that Petorca River dries out according to Lorena Donaire of Modatima.
- 2018 – Laguna de Aculeo is since 2018 a dry lake. The drying of lake is the result of below-average rainfall over the past decade and also because of human activity which are diverting rivers and pumping groundwater from aquifers, which both had replenished the lake.
- 2020
  - El Teniente mine in the Andes shuts down some its ore crushers given a scarcity of water to run them.
- 2022
  - The reservoir Embalse de Peñuela dries up.
  - For the first time in history, a water rationing plan is announced for Santiago.
- 2023
  - For the first time ever, the Ministry of Agriculture declares Magallanes Region, Chile's southernmost region, in "agricultural alert" caused by drought. The events leading up this situation are the years of 2022 and 2021 which had low precipitations. 2021 in particular was the fourth driest known year since meteorological records began.
  - Maipo River's apparent inability to break through its mouth bar following a storm surge in January 2023 has been credited to low discharge rates caused by excessive uptakes of water upstream.

== See also ==
- Drought in Chile
- Great Drought of 1968
