= Verónica Vilches =

Chilean environmentalist

- Born: July 30, 1970 (age 56); Cabildo, Chile
- Other name: Verónica del Carmen Vilches
- Occupation: Environmentalist

Verónica del Carmen Vilches Olivares (born July 30, 1970) is a Chilean environmental activist focused on issues of water access in the Chilean Province of Petorca, in the Valparaíso Region. Currently, she works as President of a drinking water supply system in San José, located within the municipality of Cabildo. In addition, she is the leader of the Movement for the Defense of Water, Land and the Protection of the Environment (MODATIMA) which seeks to defend the rights of peasants, workers and inhabitants to access water.

== Activism ==
Vilches' activism is focused on the recognition of the right to water, because the Province of Petorca is affected by a water crisis that has affected her community. According to the report carried out by the National Institute of Human Rights, this crisis is due to both natural and human factors, among which the drought and the business activities in the area stand out.

Since 2015, Vilches has been President of the rural drinking water supply system of San José, which allows water to be supplied to more than a thousand people in her community, helping its inhabitants to have access to drinking water. Together, she works as a leader of the Movement for the Defense of Water, Land and Environmental Protection (MODATIMA) which seeks to defend the rights of farmers, workers and inhabitants to access water. They have filed complaints and made visible the conflicts over water that exist in Petorca. Vilches also formed the Network of academics and professionals for the recovery of water.

In this context, Verónica Vilches has denounced continuous harassment and threats, which intensified after the report "The avocados and the great robbery" carried out by the Danish media Danwatch, which confirms that the avocado plantations of Petorca who sell their avocados in supermarkets in Denmark have been denounced for violating the Chilean Water Code. In this context, Danish supermarket chains Lidl & Aldi decided to refrain from buying this fruit. The commune of Petorca currently concentrates 40% of the avocado production in Chile.

== Threats and harassment ==
In January 2017, Verónica Vilches claimed that her community's water supply system had been sabotaged. The coercion that both Verónica Vilches and her partner Rodrigo Mundaca allege included threats such as "if you keep causing trouble with the water, we are going to kill you." In view of this, on April 5, 2017, lawyers Margarita Barbería and Rodrigo Román filed a Preventive protection in the Court of Appeals of Valparaíso in favor of Verónica Vilches, due to death threats from unknown persons.

Amnesty International issued an international Urgent Action in 2017 requesting protection for Verónica Vilches and her partner Rodrigo Mundaca, as well as an exhaustive investigation of the events they reported.

On June 7, 2018, Amnesty International delivered more than 50,000 signatures to the Valparaíso regional prosecutor, Pablo Gómez Niada, requesting the authorities to implement effective protection measures for the members of MODATIMA, urging immediate exhaustive and impartial investigations on the threats and attacks against human rights defenders, to make their results public and to bring to justice those suspected of being criminally responsible.
