= Great Drought of 1968 =

Drought in Chile

The Great Drought of 1968 (Spanish: Gran sequía de 1968) was a severe drought faced by Chile from 1967 to 1969. It was one of the largest rainfall deficits in the country during the twentieth century, comparable only to the drought of 1924. The magazine Topaze considered its effects worse than those of the 1960 Valdivia earthquake –the strongest earthquake ever recorded– and President Eduardo Frei Montalva called it "the silent earthquake" (Spanish: el terremoto silencioso).

The drought had its origin in the low amounts of precipitation that fell in 1967. The area affected by the drought spanned from Atacama Province in the north to Ñuble in the south. Albeit it had by the 1970s been suggested that droughts in Chile followed the solar cycle the Great Drought of 1968 escaped any such pattern. The drought have instead been found to overlap with the 1965–1976 period when La Niña tended to overlap with the cold phase of the Pacific decadal oscillation. In the hydrological year of 1969–1970 the area affected by the drought diminished from previously spanning the latitudes of 27–36° S to 27–32° S. The drought lasted three consecutive years, 1967, 1968 and 1969 and was part of a trend of an increasing number of three-year droughts that begun around 1930.

The government bought water tank trucks and plastic water tanks to aid in the supply of rural communities. In 30 cities the government carried out an emergency plan to assure the water supply. Politically, the drought came in a sensitive period as the Chilean land reform was underway. Scholars like Nicolás López, Fabián Jaksic and Pablo Camus posits that the drought, in conjunction with the formation of agrarian syndicates as enabled and promoted during the land reform, radicalized politics in the countryside during the late 1960s leading to occupations and labor strikes in parts of the Chilean countryside. Ultimately, social tensions influenced by the drought contributed to the showdown in the 1970 presidential election in which Salvador Allende narrowly emerged as victor.

== Precipitation deficit ==
Precipitations in the affected zones where:

City	Precipitations in mm/yr		
City	Normal	1968 (±%)	1969 (±%)
Copiapó	22.0	0 (-100%)	21.3 (-3%)
La Serena	104.3	34.2 (-67%)	9.0 (-91%)
Ovalle	125.8	36.6 (-71%)	21.5 (-83%)
Valparaíso	380.5	89.0 (-77%)	197.1 (-48%)
Santiago	329.8	62,2 (-78%)	177,3 (-46%)
Rancagua	426.1	82.0 (-81%)	242.6 (-43%)
Linares	940.9	527.1 (-44%)	896.7 (-5%)
Chillán	1024.9	536.9 (-48%)	1045.5 (+2%)

== Impact on agriculture ==
The drought created huge losses for cultivations of potato, rice, maize, beans. Fruit trees and vineyards were also affected. 100 thousand cattle and 1 million sheep died because of the drought. Milk, meat and wool output declined. By September 1969 only 250 thousand goats remained from an earlier population of 650 thousand.

Throughout rural Norte Chico, many farmers and communities came to lack water even for human consumption. In 1969 farmers received support of several financial institutions and state agencies including tax exemptions and a line of credit to buy forage.

In Central Chile, typical river flow increases in December, but this did not happen in 1968. Many farmers decided to not cultivate in early summer due to this and to the known fact there was almost no snow in Andes. Later in summer the rivers did grow due to glacier ablation, causing many farmers to repent albeit it was too late to cultivate.

== Impact on electric generation and mining ==
At the time of the drought an estimated 80% of the electric power in Chile derived from hydropower, which lead to dramatic shortages in the electric grid of Sistema Interconectado Central covering the central and most populated areas of the country. The hydroelectric deficit, amounting to was of 200 MW, was partly compensated by having the thermoelectric plants of Ventanas, Renca and Laguna Verde function at maximum capacity. National coal production from the Lota-Schwager mine was not enough to supply the need and the government authorized the import of 50 thousand tons of coal from the United States, Poland, France and Germany.

Another response to the hydropower crisis came when President Eduardo Frei Montalva decreed on October 31, 1968, the introduction of daylight saving time.

The drought impacted copper mining in Chile as water scarcity diminished hydropower production on which some mining processes depended as was the case for the mine of El Teniente.

== See also ==
- Chilean water crisis (2010–present)
- Water resources management in Chile
- Water supply and sanitation in Chile
