= Petorca water crisis =

Drought in Petorca, Chile

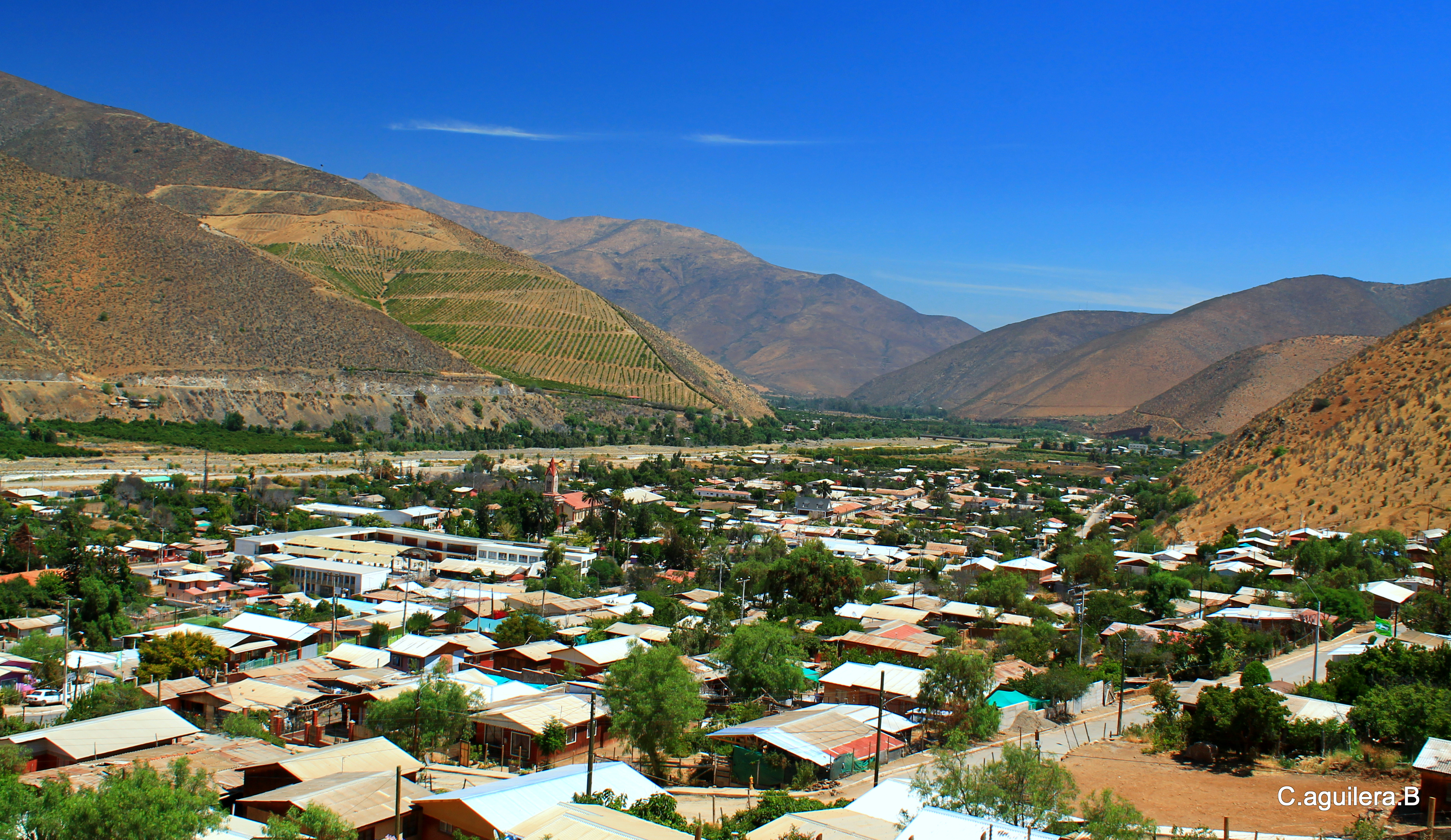
View of Petorca in the mid-2010s.

Petorca in Chile has experienced a drought as part of the Chilean water crisis since 2010. It is the longest and most intense drought in the area in 700 years. By 2018, the Ministry of Public Works had decreed Petorca a "zone of water scarcity" for fourteen consecutive years. The drought has mainly affected the lowlands and foothills, while surrounding hills maintain a healthy cover of avocado plantations.

== History ==
Lorena Donaire of the environmental organisation Modatima recalls 1985 as the first year the Petorca River dried up. The military dictatorship's agrarian counter-reform in the 1970s and 1980s and the Constitution of Chile of 1980 have been blamed for an increased concentration in the ownership of land around Petorca. Further, the Chilean Water Code of 1981 separated the ownership of land from that of water, allowing for the ownership of water rights to be more easily concentrated. These legal changes would have allowed a few wealthy landowners to dry-out the rural inhabitants of Petorca.

Rodrigo Mundaca, the spokesperson of Modatima, blames the establishment of avocado plantations in the 1990s for the drought. Avocado plantations continued to expand through the area in the 2000s. According to Lorena Donaire, the situation is aggravated by the establishment of pools of water by large landowners across the basin. 70% of the cost of these pools would have been paid by the state. In the avocado plantations of Petorca, there are up to three thousand trees per hectare.

In 2011, it was discovered that various companies engaged in regular theft of water. The owners of the enterprises Agrícola Cóndor and Agrícola Pililén have been fined for these abuses. Among these owners are the politicians Edmundo Pérez Yoma and Eduardo Cerda García.

== See also ==
- Laguna de Aculeo
- List of countries by avocado production
- Valle de Pan de Azúcar Aquifer
