= Chile and the International Monetary Fund =

Chile has been a member of the International Monetary Fund (IMF) since its inception, joining on December 31, 1945. Throughout the latter half of the 20th century, the IMF played a significant role in shaping Chile's economic trajectory, with its influence becoming particularly pronounced during the military dictatorship of Augusto Pinochet. In the modern era, the relationship has evolved, with Chile accessing IMF credit facilities as a preemptive measure during times of global economic stress.

== Membership and representation ==
Chile is an original member of the IMF, having joined on the last day of 1945. The country's financial contribution to the Fund, known as its quota, is over 1.7 million Special Drawing Rights (SDRs), which grants it a voting share of 18,908. This quota determines Chile's financial commitment and its influence within the institution.

== Historical context ==
=== Early relations and the Pinochet era ===
The relationship between Chile and the IMF underwent a profound shift following the 1973 Chilean coup d'état, which overthrew the democratically elected socialist government of Salvador Allende. The new military regime, led by General Augusto Pinochet, radically reoriented the country's economic policy towards neoliberalism and laissez-faire principles.

Pinochet delegated economic management to a group of technocrats known as the "Chicago Boys", many of whom were educated at the University of Chicago. Their initial challenge was to combat hyperinflation, which had soared to an annual rate exceeding 500%. The IMF, which viewed the overthrow of Allende favorably, quickly engaged with the new government. It provided substantial financial support, approving loans of $79 million in both 1975 and 1976. This period saw a reduction in inflation and significant cuts to the public sector.

=== Economic crisis and deepening IMF involvement ===
By the early 1980s, Chile's economic model faced a severe crisis. Inflation resurged, and the nation experienced a deep recession, with the poverty rate climbing to over 40% of the population. The influence of the Chicago Boys waned, and they were gradually replaced by more pragmatic economists. This shift allowed the IMF to exert greater direct influence over Chilean economic policy. The Fund advocated for further market-oriented reforms and dramatically increased its financial assistance, with loans exceeding $800 million in 1985 alone.

== Recent relations ==
Since Chile's return to democracy in 1990, its relationship with the IMF has evolved into that of a stable and creditworthy partner. The country has sought IMF financial support on only two occasions in the democratic era: a loan in 1983, and more recently, a series of Flexible Credit Line arrangements beginning in 2020 to address economic pressures.

=== Flexible Credit Line arrangements ===
Chile has established itself as one of the few countries qualified for the IMF's Flexible Credit Line (FCL), a precautionary facility reserved for nations with very strong economic fundamentals and policy frameworks.

In 2020, Chile secured its first FCL arrangement for approximately US$24 billion (1,000% of quota) to address economic pressures stemming from the COVID-19 pandemic. This was followed by a second two-year arrangement in 2022 for US$18.5 billion (800% of quota) to provide insurance against adverse scenarios including global slowdown, commodity price shocks, and spillovers from Russia's war in Ukraine.

Most recently, in August 2024, the IMF approved a successor two-year FCL arrangement for US$13.8 billion (600% of quota), reflecting Chile's continued strong economic fundamentals while acknowledging a reduction in access due to improved near-term outlook. The mid-term review concluded in August 2025 reaffirmed Chile's continued qualification, with the arrangement serving as a buffer against elevated external risks including global trade tensions and potential declines in copper prices.

The Chilean authorities have consistently treated these FCL arrangements as precautionary, maintaining them as insurance rather than drawing on the funds, and have expressed commitment to gradually reducing access as external risks diminish.

== See also ==
- Economy of Chile
- History of Chile
- Chicago Boys
