= Valle de Pan de Azúcar Aquifer =

Coordinates: 30°1′56.29″S 71°15′3.51″W

Valle de Pan de Azúcar Aquifer (Spanish: acuífero del Valle de Pan de Azúcar) is an aquifer located in an agricultural zone in the semi-arid Coquimbo Region of northern Chile. Since 2003 the water authority Dirección General de Aguas has restricted the inscription of new wells tapping the aquifer. Given its proximity to the Pacific Ocean part of the aquifer has been subject to saline intrusion. A series of artificial groundwater recharge wells have been constructed in the 2020s as part of a joint project between the Netherlands and the Government of Coquimbo Region.

== See also ==
- Petorca water crisis
