= Governor of Biobío Region =

Elected official in Chile

- Gobernador de la Región del Biobío

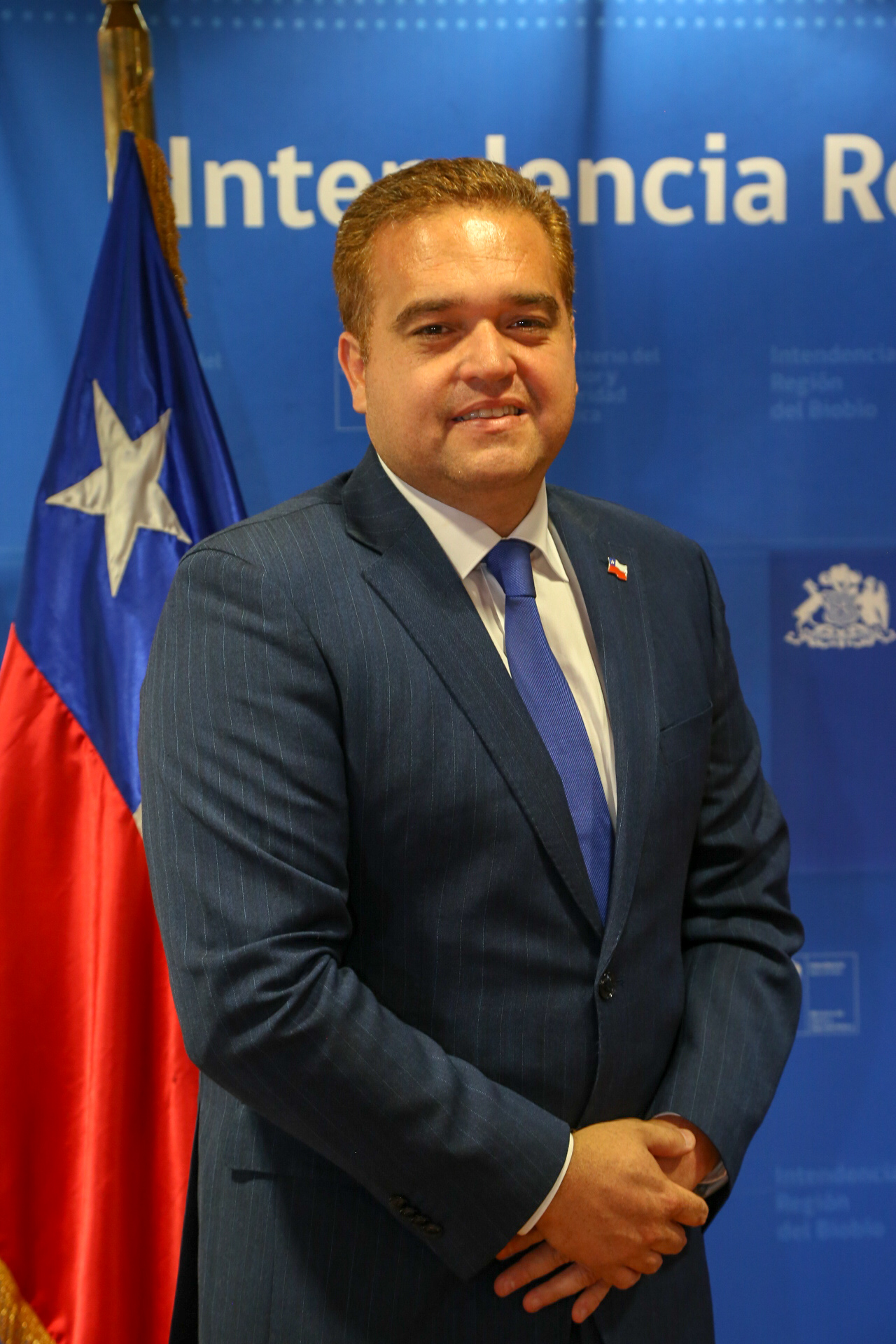
- Incumbent; Sergio Giacaman since December 6, 2024
- Biobío Region
- Appointer: Electorate of Biobío Region
- Term length: Four years, renewable once
- Inaugural holder: Rodrigo Díaz Worner
- Formation: July 14, 2021
- Website: gorebiobio.cl

The Governor of the Biobío Region is the authority elected by popular vote through universal suffrage since 2021 to govern the Biobío Region, Chile.

== History ==
The 2017 constitutional reform established the popular election of the executive body of the regional government, creating the position of Regional governor (Gobernador regional) and introducing the figure of Regional presidential delegate (Delegado presidencial regional), who represents the President of Chile in the region and oversees it alongside Provincial presidential Delegates (Delegados presidenciales provinciales) in each province.

The first regional governor elections in Chile were held on May 15 and 16, 2021, with the elected officials assuming office on July 14 of the same year.

Former Intendant Rodrigo Díaz Worner won the election for the Biobío Region, becoming the first person to hold that position. On April 22, 2024, Díaz Worner announced that he would not run for re-election.

On November 24, 2024, former Intendant of the Biobío Region, Sergio Giacaman, was elected in a runoff election against former Senator Alejandro Navarro.

== Governor of the Biobío Region ==
Portrait	Governor	Term of office			Party
Portrait	Governor	Start	End	Duration	Party
	Rodrigo Díaz Worner	July 14, 2021	December 6, 2024	3 years, 145 days	Independent (2020-) DC (1984-2020)
	Sergio Giacaman	December 6, 2024	Incumbent	1 year, 349 days	Independent
