= Governor of Valparaíso Region =

Elected official in Chile

- Gobernador de la Región de Valparaíso

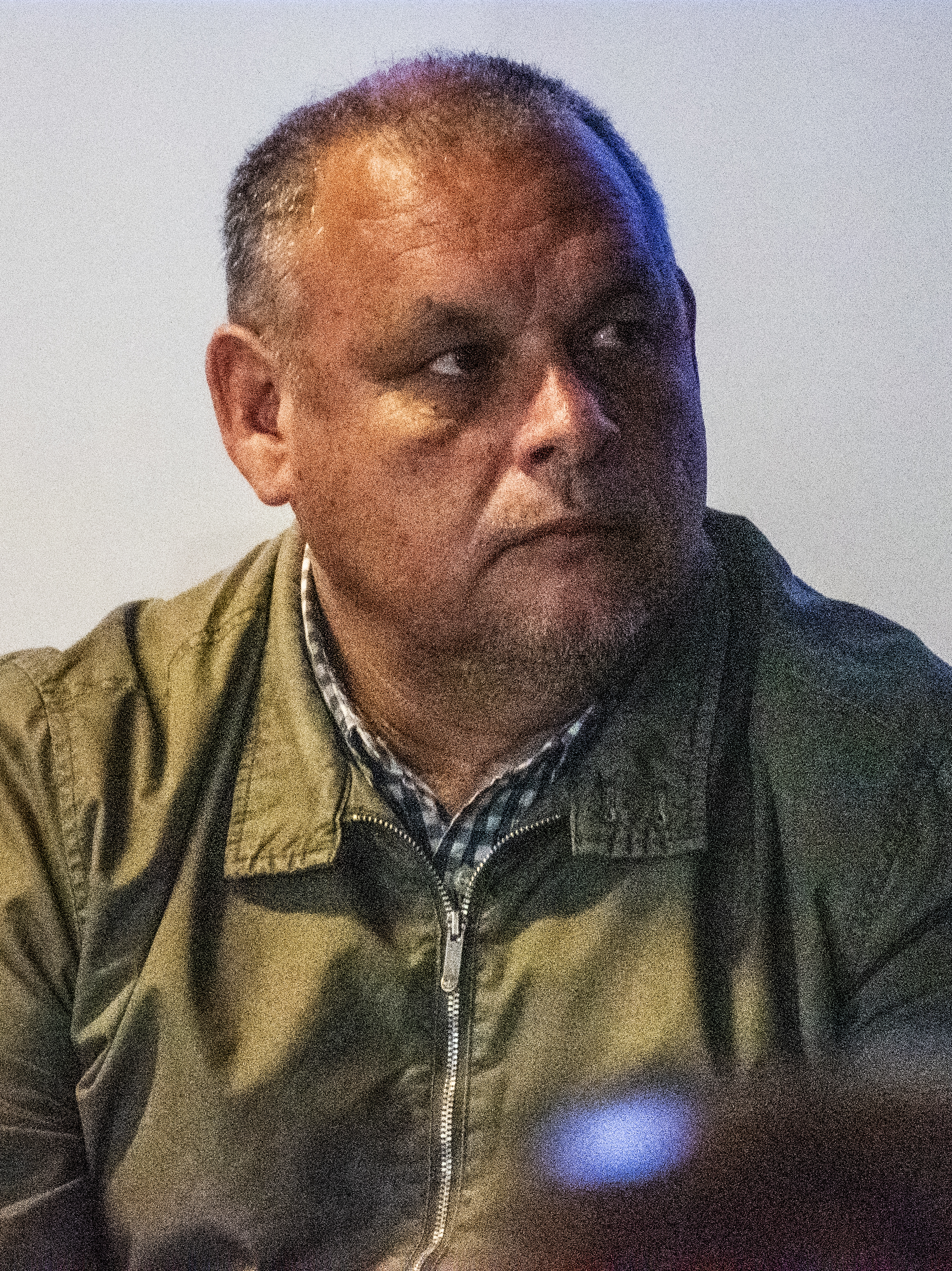
- Incumbent; Rodrigo Mundaca since July 14, 2021
- Valparaíso Region
- Appointer: Electorate of Valparaíso Region
- Term length: Four years, renewable once
- Inaugural holder: Rodrigo Mundaca
- Formation: July 14, 2021
- Website: www.gorevalparaiso.cl

The Governor of the Valparaíso Region is the authority elected by popular vote through universal suffrage since 2021 to govern the Valparaíso Region, Chile.

== History ==
The 2017 constitutional reform established the popular election of the executive body of the regional government, creating the position of Regional governor (gobernador regional) and introducing the figure of Regional presidential delegation (Delegado presidencial regional), who represents the President of Chile in the region and oversees it alongside Provincial presidential Delegates (Delegados presidenciales provinciales).

The first regional governor elections in Chile were held on May 15 and 16, 2021, with the elected officials assuming office on July 14 of the same year.

Environmental activist and engineer Rodrigo Mundaca won the election for the Valparaíso Region, becoming the first person to hold that position. On November 24, 2024, Mundaca was reelected for a second term.

== Governor of the Valparaíso Region ==
Portrait	Governor	Term of office			Party
Portrait	Governor	Start	End	Duration	Party
	Rodrigo Mundaca	July 14, 2021	Incumbent	5 years, 56 days	Independent
