= Regional governor (Chile) =

Elected official of regions in Chile

Regional Governor of Chile
- Gobernador regional de Chile
- Coat of arms of Chile
- Appointer: Universal suffrage
- Term length: Four years, renewable once
- Formation: July 14, 2021

In Chile, the Regional Governor (Spanish: Gobernador regional) serves as the chief executive in each of the 16 regions, functioning as head of government.

Since 2021, the Regional Governor is responsible for presiding over the regional council (gobierno regional) and exercising the functions and powers determined by the constitutional organic law, in coordination with other bodies and public services created for the fulfillment of administrative functions.

Additionally, the Regional Governor is in charge of the coordination, supervision, or oversight of public services that depend on or are related to the regional government. However, this role does not automatically or naturally represent the President of Chile in each region, unlike the now-defunct regional intendant (intendente regional); for such representation, Law 20990 created the position of Regional Presidential Delegate (Delegado presidencial regional).

== History ==
The 1980 Constitution creates and regulates the authorities that govern and administer both regions and provinces. Initially, the original Charter established a system with Intendants and Governors as the main authorities. Later, this design was partially reformed by Law 19097, enacted by President Patricio Aylwin in 1991, which created the Regional Government.

A constitutional reform in 2017, through Law 20.990, established the popular election of the executive body of the regional government in Chile, replacing the previous regional political authority, the regional intendant, with two new authorities. The first of these is the Regional Governor, who is elected by universal suffrage in a direct vote. The first election of regional governors was held on May 15 and 16, 2021, alongside the municipal elections. The Regional Governor serves a term of four years and may be re-elected consecutively only for the immediately following term.

The second authority is appointed by the President of the Republic and is called the Regional Presidential Delegate. Both authorities coexist in the same administrative unit, namely the region, and have similar powers and competencies for regional management.

== Role and powers ==
The Regional Governor has, among other functions:

- Formulate development policies for the region, considering the respective communal policies and plans.
- Submit regional development policies, strategies, and project plans, along with their modifications, to the regional council.
- Present the budget proposal of the respective regional government to the regional council.
- Represent the regional government judicially and extrajudicially, and may execute acts and enter into contracts within their competence or as assigned by the council.
- Appoint and remove officials deemed as trusted by the law.
- Ensure compliance with standards on administrative integrity.
- Coordinate, supervise, or oversee, as appropriate, public services that depend on or are related to the respective regional government.
- Promulgate, with the agreement of the regional council, the regional land use plan, metropolitan and intercommunal regulatory plans, communal and sectional plans, and detailed plans of intercommunal regulatory plans.
- Preside over the regional council.

== See also ==
- Governor of the Santiago Metropolitan Region
- Governor of Valparaíso Region
- Governor of Biobío Region
