= Petorca River =

Location
- Country: Chile

The Petorca River is a river of Chile. The catchment of Petorca River has been the subject of a severe drought the last decades. Lorena Donaire of the environmental organisation Modatima recalls 1985 as the first year Petorca River dried.

== See also ==
- List of rivers of Chile
