= Rodrigo Mundaca =

Chilean politician

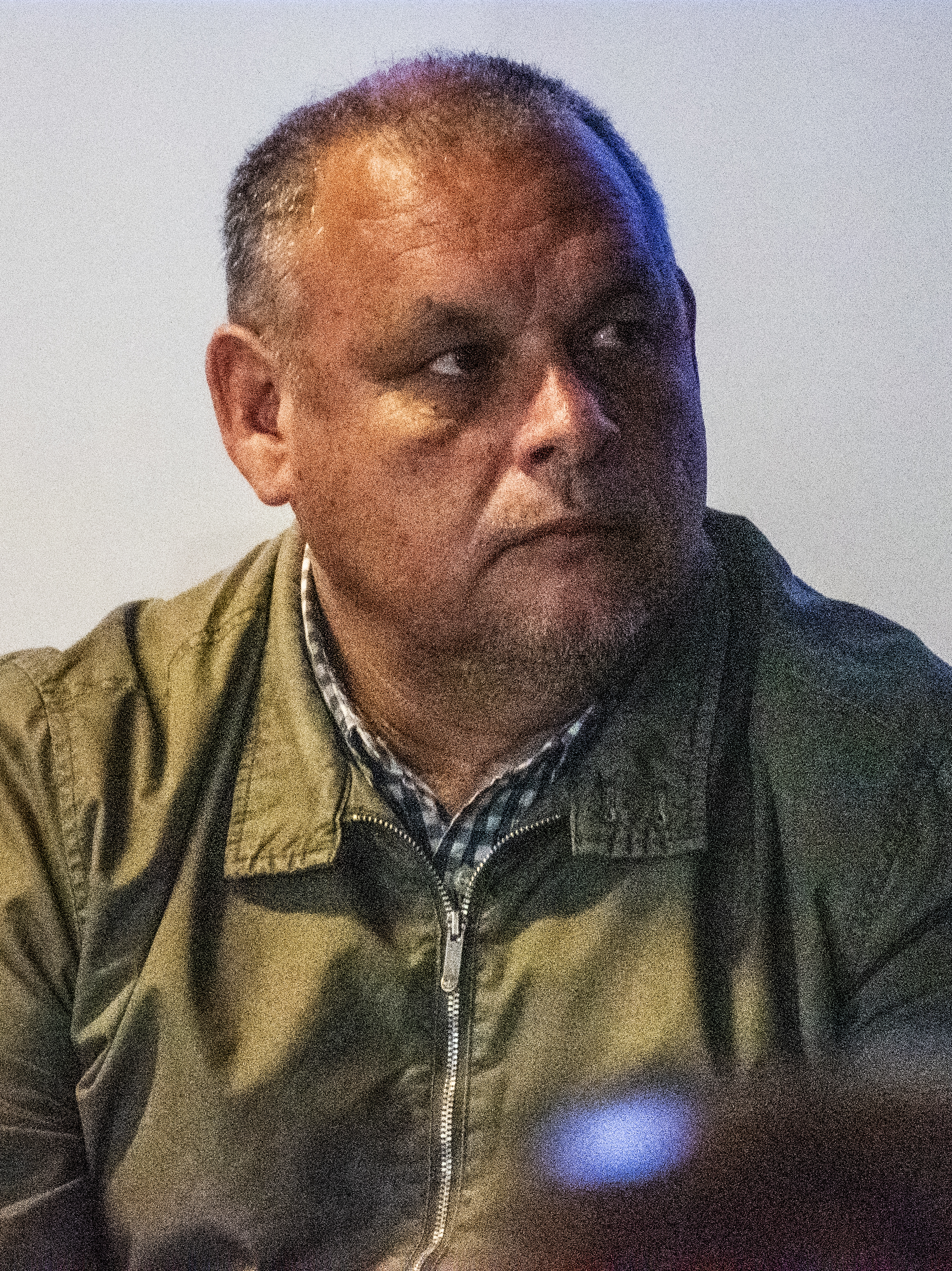

Governor of Valparaíso Region
- Incumbent
- Assumed office 14 July 2021
- Preceded by: Office created

Personal details
- Born: 13 May 1961 (age 65) Santiago, Chile
- Party: Independent
- Other political affiliations: Broad Front
- Spouse: Verónica Vilches
- Education: University of Matanzas
- Profession: Agricultural engineering

Rodrigo Eduardo Alexis Mundaca Cabrera (born 13 May 1961) is a Chilean politician, agricultural engineer and environmental activist. He is the Governor of the Valparaíso Region since July 14, 2021.

Mundaca has been director and spokesperson of the environmental organization Modatima. In 2017 he and his partner Verónica Vilches claim to have received death threats for their activism against unfair water extraction by landowners.

In 2019 he won the Nuremberg International Human Rights Award.
