= Chile and the World Bank =

Chile joined the International Monetary Fund (IMF) and International Bank for Reconstruction and Development (IBRD), the founding branch of the World Bank Group, on December 31, 1945.

== History ==
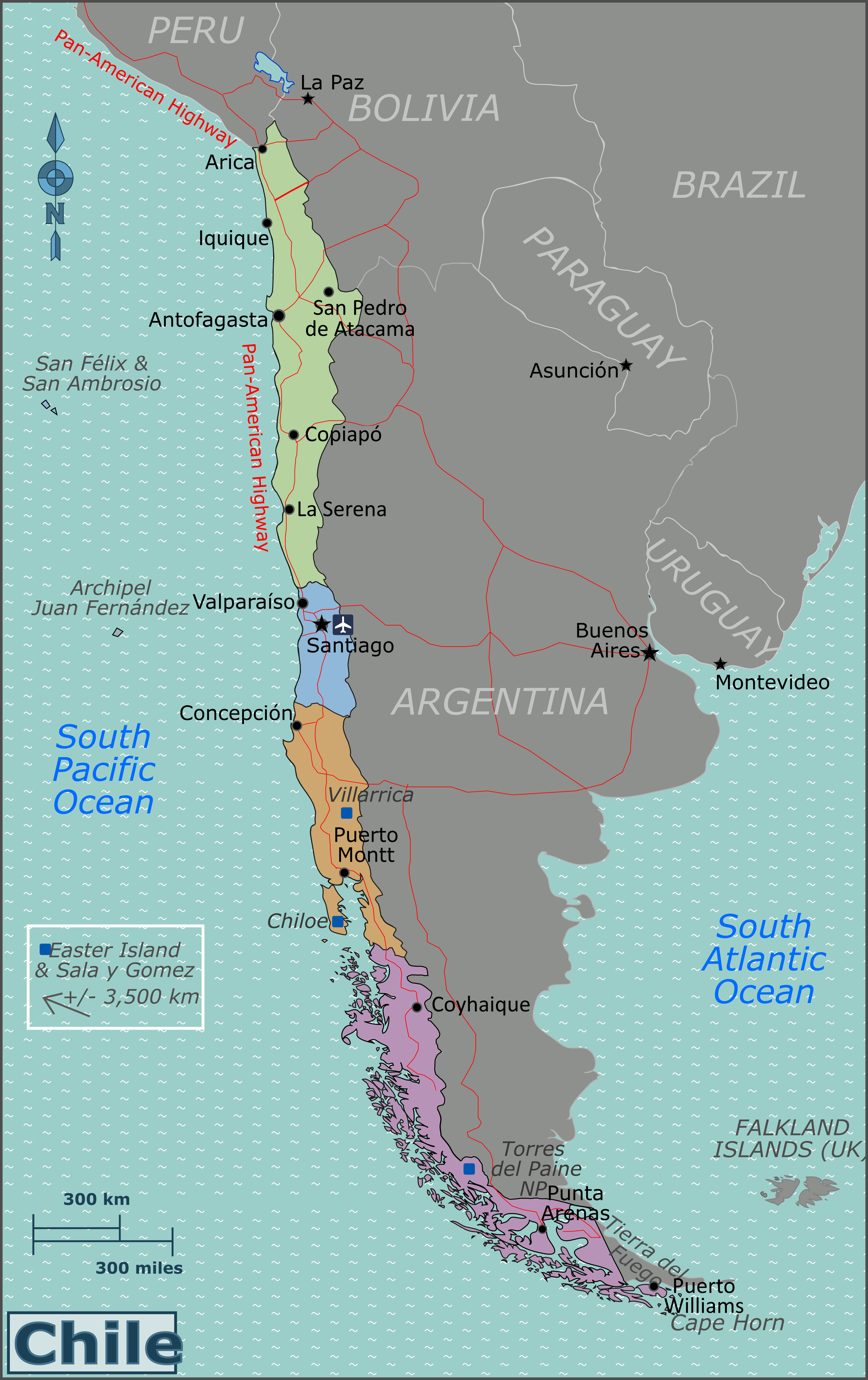
Map of the regions within Chile

Chile was one of the 44 original member countries at the 1944 Bretton Woods Conference who signed its Articles of Agreement. Chile joined other branches of the World Bank Group relatively soon after their creation. They joined the International Development Association (IDA) on December 30, 1960, the International Finance Corporation (IFC) on April 15, 1957, and the Multilateral Investment Guarantee Agency (MIGA) the day it was established on April 12, 1988. The exception was the International Centre for Settlement of Investment Disputes (ICSID) which Chile joined on October 24, 1991, 25 years after its establishment.

As of 2019, the World Bank considered Chile an emerging market and developing economy, with an economy that is 30% or more dependent on a single-export commodity. Copper ore (at $16.6B) and refined copper (at $14.9B) represented 45% of all Chilean exports.

The World Bank considers Chile to be a success story. "Chile has been one of Latin America’s fastest-growing economies in recent decades, enabling the country to significantly reduce poverty. Between 2000 and 2017, the population living in poverty (on US$ 4 per day) decreased from 31% to 6.4%."

== World Bank ==
In December 2017, the World Bank Group established an office Santiago, Chile.
