= San Carlos Canal =

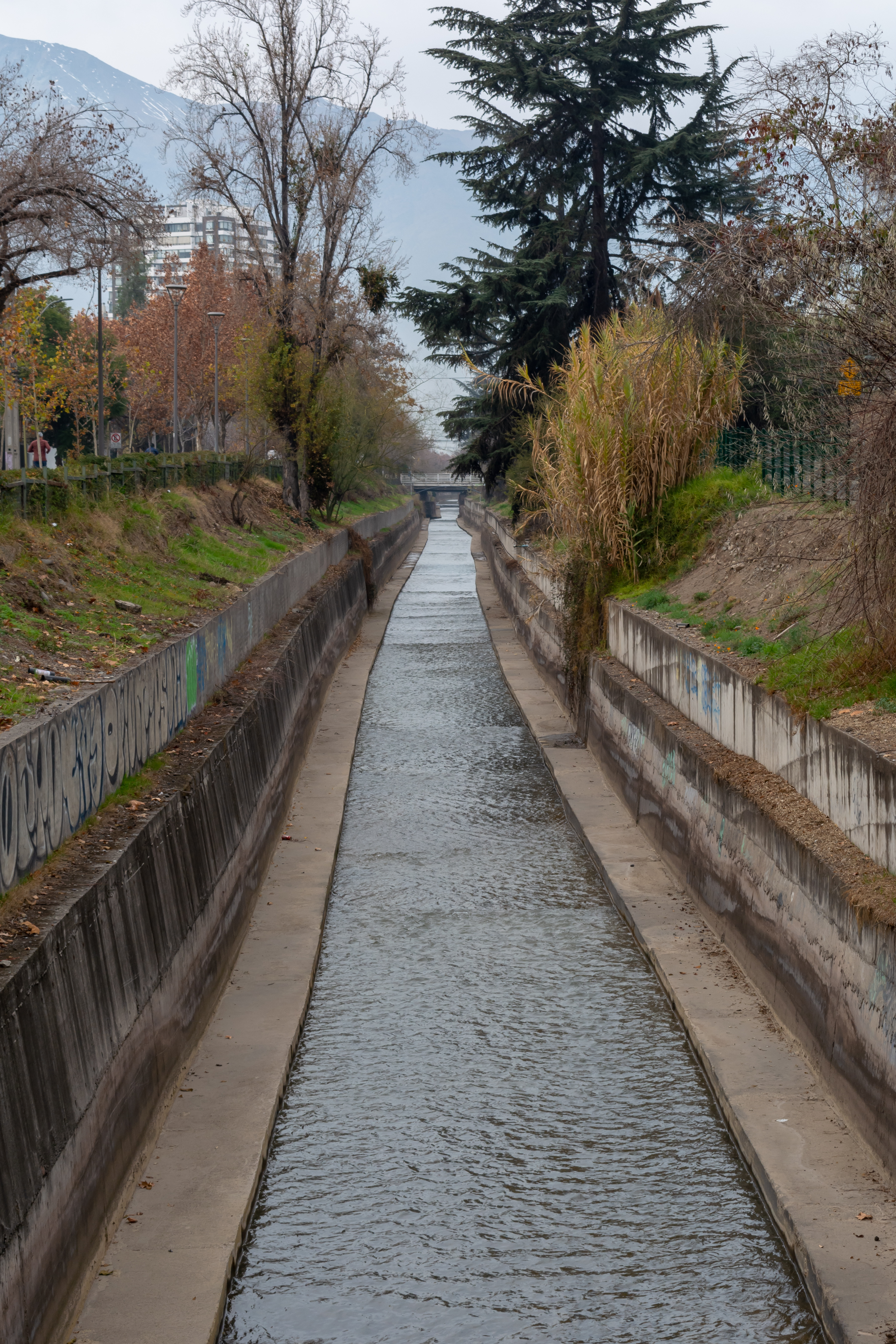
Canal San Carlos in Las Condes in 2022, looking southwards

The San Carlos Canal (Spanish: Canal San Carlos) or Maipo Canal is a water supply canal located around the east of Santiago, Chile.

It diverts water from the Maipo River into the Mapocho River.
