= Drought in Chile =

Through its history, Chile was regularly affected by droughts. In the more arid parts of Chile droughts are produced when there are low amounts of snow accumulation in the Andes. Chilean coastal drainage basins without snow accumulation are particularly vulnerable to drought.

The territory of Central Chile has been affected by long-term droughts in 1280–1450, 1570–1650, 1770–1820 and 2010–present.

== Historical droughts ==
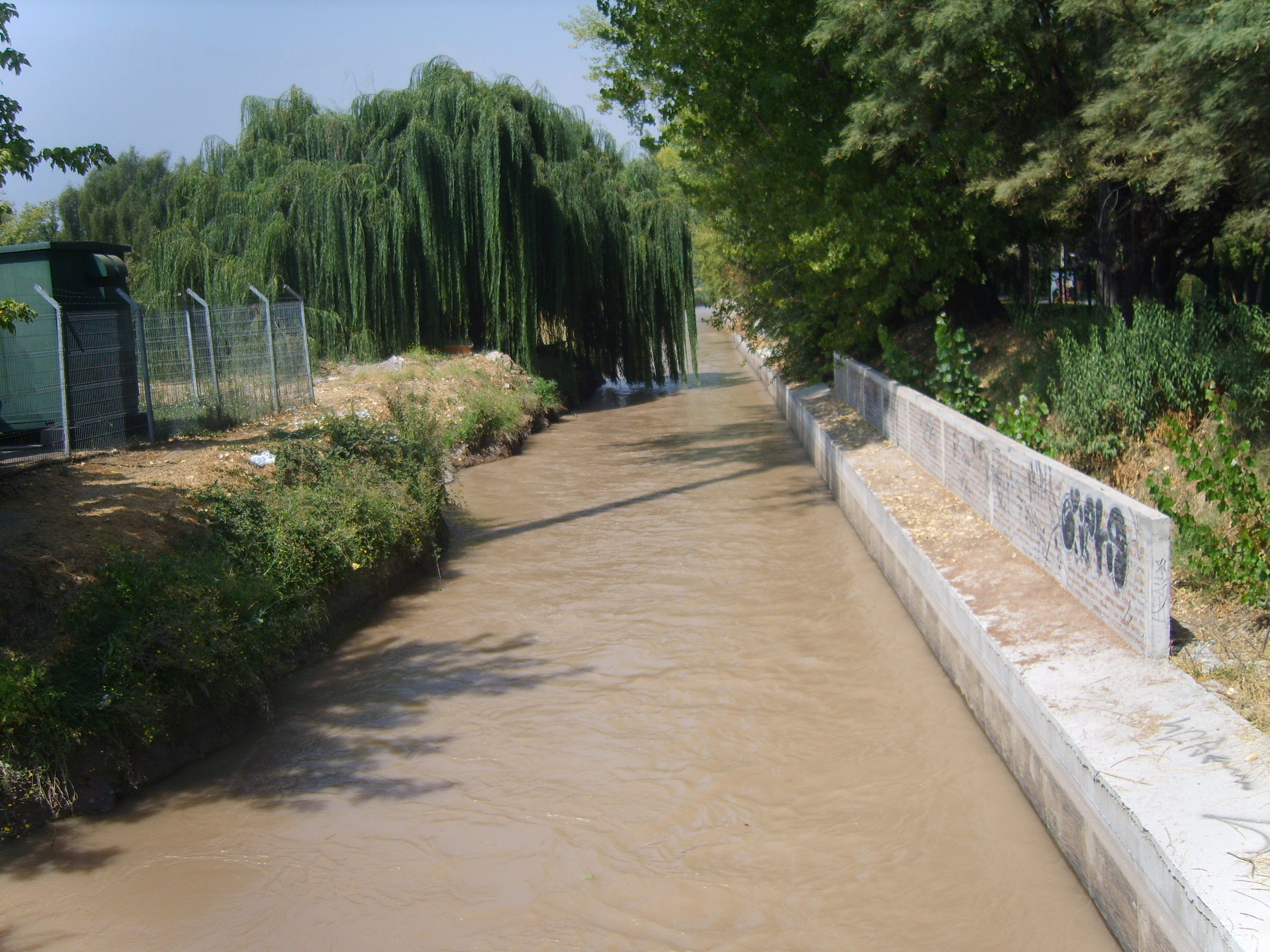
San Carlos Canal in picture begun to be built in 1772 in response to years of drought.

=== Drought of 1770–82 ===
The 1770–1782 period was one of general drought in Central Chile with a total of three non-consecutive years of extreme drought. In 1772 vineyards and cropfields along Mapocho River in Santiago could not be irrigated. This drought led the authorities to begin the construction of the long-planned San Carlos Canal in 1772 to divert water from Maipo River to Mapocho River.

=== Drought of 1924 ===
In 1924 a drought spread between Coquimbo and Maule provinces. In Coquimbo Province 70% of the wheat from non-irrigated land was lost while in irrigated areas the harvest loss was of 20%. The price of railroad transport of livestock to places south of Curicó was lowered by 40% as there was hardly any grass or plant buds for livestock to eat in Norte Chico.

Rural people in Coquimbo Region flocked around the towns of Illapel, Combarbalá and Ovalle. Later the intendant of Coquimbo claimed that about hundred people had left the province as result of the drought.

=== Great Drought of 1968 ===
The drought faced by Chile between 1968, known as the Great Drought of 1968, was one of the largest rainfall deficits in the country during the twentieth century, comparable only to the drought of 1924. The drought had its origin in the low amounts of precipitation that fell in 1967. The area affected by the drought spanned from Atacama Province in the north to Ñuble in the south.

The drought created huge losses for cultivations of potato, rice, maize, beans. Fruit trees and vineyards were also affected. 100 thousand cattle and 1 million sheep died because of the drought. Milk, meat and wool output declined. By September 1969 only 250 thousand goats remained from an earlier population of 650 thousand.

Throughout rural Norte Chico, many farmers and communities came to lack water even for human consumption. In 1969 farmers received support of several financial institutions and state agencies including tax exemptions and a line of credit to buy forage.

In Central Chile, typical river flow increases in December, but this did not happen in 1968. Chile many farmers decided to not cultivate in early summer due to this and to the known fact there was almost no snow in Andes. Later in summer the rivers did grow due to glacier ablation, causing many farmers to repent albeit it was too late to cultivate.

The decline in hydroelectric power generation (The hydroelectric deficit was of 200 MW) was partly compensated by having the thermoelectric plants of Ventanas, Renca and Laguna Verde function at maximum capacity. National coal production from the Lota-Schwager mine was not enough to supply the need and the government authorized the import of 50 thousand tons of coal from the United States, Poland, France and Germany.

In the hydrological year of 1969–1970 the area affected by the drought diminished from previously spanning the latitudes of 27–36° S to 27–32° S.

=== Drought of 1998 ===
Beginning in January 1997 the El Niño phenomenon affected Chile during 1 year until 1998. Sea temperatures were high in the Pacific.

The drought of 1998 caused an energy shortage in SIC, Chile's main power grid. The energy shortage was worsened by problems in the Nehuenco Power Plant driven by natural gas. Annual rainfall in Zona Sur was far below previous record lows: in Valdivia only 1,033.8 millimetres or 40.70 inches fell and in Concepción just 598.6 millimetres or 23.57 inches, whereas the lowest before 1996 had been 674 millimetres (26.54 in) in 1924.

=== Chilean water crisis ===
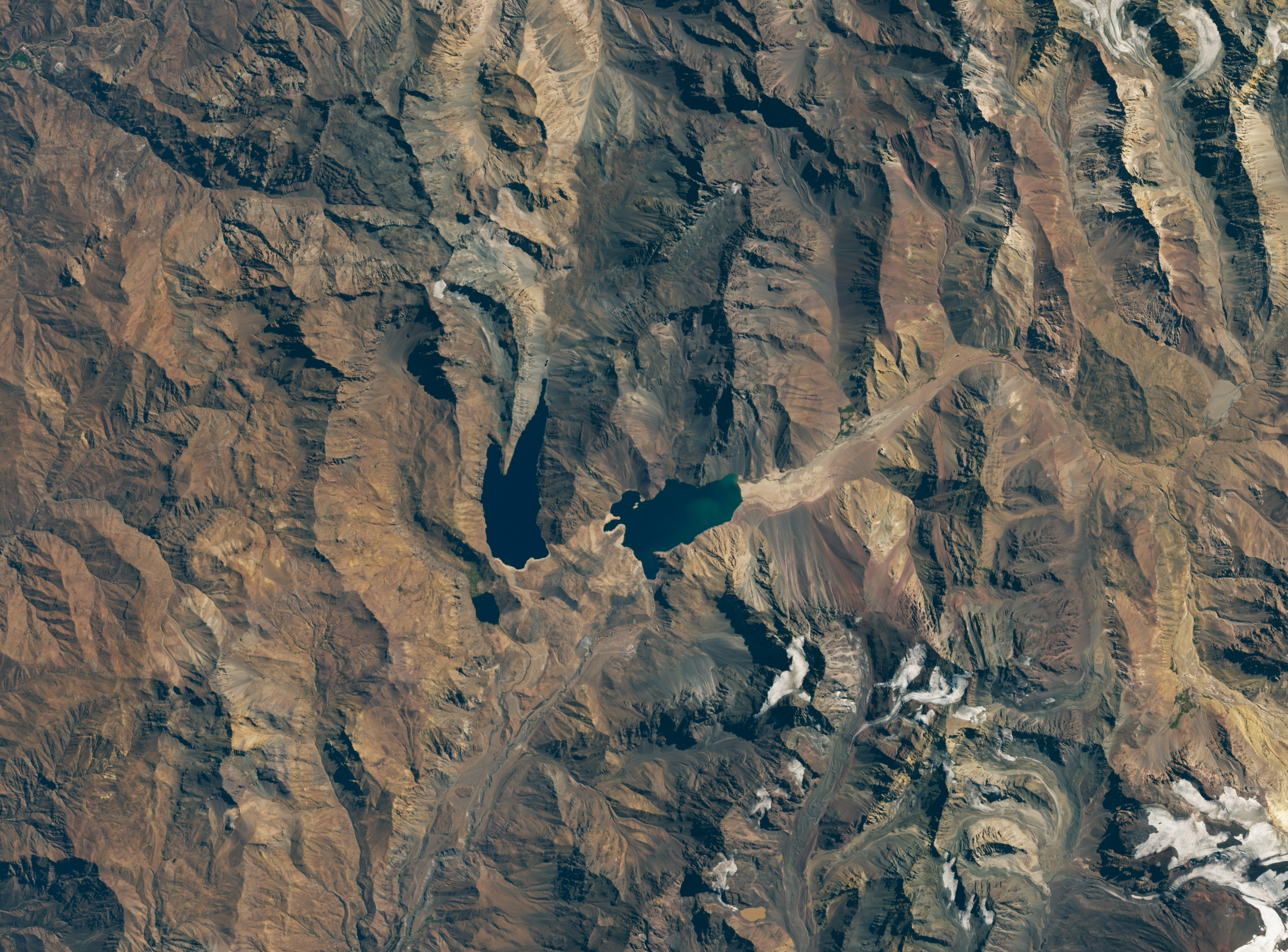
El Yeso reservoir at 40% capacity in March 2020

The 1980 Constitution of Chile created under dictator Augusto Pinochet recognizes water use rights as private property In 1981, Pinochet's government rewrote laws regulating water and water use rights (Código de Aguas), granting the sale and privatization of water use rights in a manner similar to the stock market. The sale of water rights has been blamed as a primary factor leading to lower water levels in some areas. Chile began to experience a drought in 2010 and by 2020, precipitation was 20–45% of average nationally and 10–20% of average in the area of Santiago. By 2022, Chile was ranked 16th of 164 for water stress in the world according to the University of Chile. In April 2022, Chile began a plan to ration water.
