= Nehuenco Power Plant =

Natural gas power station in Chile

Nehuenco Power Plant or Nehuenco I or 1 is a natural gas electrical generating station in Quillota, Valparaíso Region, Chile. The plant uses both natural gas and diesel as fuel and produces 368 MW of electricity. The plant was built in 1999 and is run by Colbún S.A.

Nehuenco II Power Plant or Nehuenco 2 is a similar station on the same site with the same operator. The plant produces 390 MW of electricity. The plant was built in 2003.
