= Modatima =

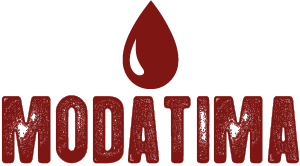
The MODATIMA logo

Modatima, the “Movement for the Defense of Access to Water, Land and Environmental Protection”, is an organization formed in Chile out of the province of Petorca. The organization was created in 2010 as a response to increased water scarcity in the region caused by an ongoing drought and alleged water theft by local agribusiness, specifically large-scale avocado farmers. Motadima activists state that their mission is to make visible the conflicts over water in the region at a national scale and bring to light the commodification of water driven by the 1981 Water Code. Motadima has spoken at universities and held demonstrations across the country for their cause.

The organization has expanded their presence to the regions of O’Higgins, Los Lagos, Arica & Parinacota and Metropolitana. Modatima has also joined La Red Vida, a transnational organization representing water and land rights across the Americas.

People in the region of Petorca get their water delivered by truck with each person receiving 50 liters a day, lower than the national average use of 196 liter per day, per capita. Water is delivered by unmarked trucks, and resident have noted that water received is often discoloured and not clean. Studies have found that the water given to the community contains high levels of coliform.

== Threats ==
Rodrigo Mundaca, the organizations director and spokesperson, along with other local water activists such as Veronica Vilches have received numerous death threats in relation to their activism. Mundaca faced charges and possible jail time in 2012 when he released names of businesses who had built illegal underground channels diverting water from the River Petorca to their farms.

== See also ==
- Petorca water crisis
