= List of political scandals in Chile =

This is a list of major political scandals in Chile.

== 1800s ==
- "Scorpion" scandal (1809) – a smuggling scandal that caused the fall of the Royal Governor and hastened Chilean Independence

== 1810s ==
- Killing of Manuel Rodríguez Erdoíza

== 1820s ==
- Chilean Civil War of 1829

== 1830s ==
- Quillota mutiny Killing of Diego Portales

== 1850s ==
- Sinking of the ship Cazador, on 30 January 1856, off Punta Carranza near Constitución, Chile. 307 adults died, Children and stowaway were not registered.
- Cuestión del Sacristán: The archbishop of Santiago refused to obey a court decision
- 1851 Chilean Revolution

== 1870s ==
- Capture of the Chilean transporter Rímac (1872) on July 23, 1879, during the War of the Pacific. This caused a crisis in the Chilean government which in turn caused the resignation of Admiral Juan Williams Rebolledo commander of the Chilean fleet.

== 1880s ==
- Lieutenant Colonel Ambrosio Letelier is filed of corruption and court martialed in Lima after his expedition to defeat the last forces of Pierola during the Chilean occupation of Peru.

== 1890s ==
- 1891 Chilean Civil War

== 1900s ==
- Meat riots in Santiago, Chile in October 1905 were the earliest and one of the biggest riots to take place in Chile
- Santa María de Iquique School Massacre ("Matanza de la Escuela Santa María de Iquique") (1907) – the slaughter of hundreds of striking saltpeter workers in Iquique at the hands of the police and military forces

== 1910s ==
- Forrahue massacre, October 12 1912

== 1920s ==
- San Gregorio massacre on 3 February 1921
- La Coruña massacre, on 5 Juni 1925
- Ladislao's war (1920) – a phony threat of war in order to reduce voters to opposition candidate.
- Ruido de sables (1924) – the display of discomfort by young military men during a session of the Senate
- Marusia massacre (1925) – 500 miners shot dead by the police forces

== 1930s ==
- Norte Grande insurrection (December 25, 1931) was a violent and ultimately unsuccessful attempt against the government of Chilean President Juan Esteban Montero
- Socialist Republic of Chile a twelve days socialist experiment in 1932
- Ranquil massacre massacre of forestry workers by the Chilean Army in the upper Bio-Bio River in 1934.
- Seguro Obrero massacre (1938) – 58 people murdered by police in the wake of an attempted Nazi putsch
- Ariostazo a revolt of the Tacna artillery regiment in August 1939
- 1931 Chilean naval mutiny

== 1940s ==
- Law of Permanent Defense of the Democracy Chile's president Gabriel González Videla banned communist and like-minded parties that supported him during the 1946 Chilean presidential election. Pablo Neruda went into exile.

== 1950s ==
- Watches affair (1953) – a corruption scandal that ended the political career of María De la Cruz, the first Chilean woman senator
- Línea Recta affair In February 1955 president Carlos Ibáñez del Campo met a group of army officers in order to prepare dictatorial powers to the president.

== 1960s ==
- United States intervention in Chile 1963-1973
- Massacre of Puerto Montt (a.k.a. Massacre of Pampa Irigoin) on 9 March 1969 eleven squatters were shot dead in Puerto Montt
- Tacnazo 1969, a military mutiny

== 1970s ==
- René Schneider (1970) – General Schneider assassinated during a botched kidnapping attempt in order to block Allende's constitutional election
- Edmundo Pérez Zujovic (1971) – minister during the massacre of Puerto Montt in 1969 was killed on June 8
- Cuban packages (1972) – a smuggling scandal involving President Salvador Allende
- Alejandrina Cox incident (1973) – a traffic incident that caused the resignation of the Army Commander-in-chief and hastened the Chilean coup of 1973
- Arturo Araya Peeters (1973) – Araya, a Captain of the Chilean Navy is assassinated in Jule by Patria y Libertad
- 1973 Chilean coup d'état

For a more extensive list of scandals and crimes committed during the Pinochet era, see

Rettig Report
Valech Report
Human Rights Violations of the Chilean dictatorship

- Charles Horman, Frank Teruggi (1973) – US journalists tortured and killed by the military during the 1973 Chilean coup d'état
- Michael Woodward (1973) – UK priest, tortured aboard the Chilean naval vessel Esmeralda (BE-43)
- Caravan of Death (1973) – 70 people executed by the military after the 1973 Chilean coup d'état
- Lonquén On 15 October 1973, 15 men were arrested in the community of Isla de Maipo. Their remains were found on 30 November 1979 in abandoned lime kilns in Lonquén.
- Operation Colombo (1975) – murder of 119 political opponents of Pinochet by the Chilean DINA
- Leighton case (1973) – Chilean General Manuel Contreras, head of DINA, has been indicted in Italy in 1995 for ordering the Leighton murder.
- Cooperativa de Ahorro y Crédito La Familia crashed and involved Jaime Guzmán, Luis Cordero, Cristián García-Huidobro and Claudio Arteaga, all founders of the Independent Democrat Union
- Operation Condor (1976-) – a campaign of political repression involving assassination and intelligence operations by the right-wing dictatorships of Argentina, Chile, Uruguay, Paraguay, Bolivia and Brazil
- Villa Grimaldi was a complex of buildings used for the interrogation and torture of political prisoners by DINA, the Chilean secret police, during the government of Augusto Pinochet.
- Carlos Prats (1974) – Assassination of Chilean General in the frame of Operation Condor.
- Letelier case (1976) – Chilean politician and former minister murdered in Washington D.C.
- Chilean Amnesty Law of 1978 (1978) – "entrenches impunity of those responsible for torture, disappearances and other serious human rights violations"

== 1980s ==
- Without any explanation Philippines's dictator Ferdinand Marcos canceled Augusto Pinochet's visit in Manila few hours before landing.
- 1980 Chilean constitutional referendum was held on September 11, 1980, to approve the 1980 Political Constitution of the Republic of Chile as a replacement for Chile's 1925 constitution. This plebiscite has been, and continues to be, questioned regarding irregularities in its management.
- Chilean economical crisis 1982-3 By 1983, the Chilean economy was devastated: of the 19 banks that the government had privatised, all but five failed, GNP fell 14% during 1982-3.
- Boris Weisfeiler (1985) – an American Jewish professor of Russian origin disappeared near Colonia Dignidad.
- Caso Degollados (1985) – a brutal murder of three professionals that caused the resignation of the Police Head and profound changes in the political and legal structure of the government
- Burnt Alive case ("Caso Quemados") (1986) – a photographer and a college student are kidnapped and then burnt alive after a political protest, by a military patrol
- Corpus Christi killings (Matanza de Corpus Christi) (1987) – the assassination of 12 members of the Manuel Rodríguez Patriotic Front in Santiago by the Dirección de Inteligencia Nacional later called Central Nacional de Informaciones
- Televisión Nacional de Chile (3 December 1987) showed a secret service video of a young woman, tortured, imprisoned, and forced to make a public statement of guilt of her involvement in the kidnapping of an army officer
- Carmengate (1988) – presidential primary election fraud at the Chilean Christian Democrat Party headquarters.
- 1989 Chilean grape scare involving two grapes in Chile that were found to be tainted with Cyanide. None were found upon testing
- La Cutufa a clandestine finance syndicate offered investors, mostly officers of the army, tax-free interest rates of 20% a month. After a dissatisfied investor was murdered, 4 generals and 16 officers were cashiered and 200 sanctioned.

== 1990s ==
- Jonathan Moyle, a UK journalist, was found dead in Santiago de Chile in March 1990
- Pinocheques A corruption scandal involving the eldest son of Augusto Pinochet.
- Killing of Senator Jaime Guzmán in 1991
- Operation Silence (1991) DINE (successor to DINA) assists several military and DINA officers wanted for human rights abuse to escape from Chile (including Eugenio Berrios, Arturo Sanhueza Ross, Carlos Herrera Jiménez)
- Sold of weapons to Croatia and assassination of Gerardo Huber (1992), a former DINA officer. The deal involved 370 tons of weapons, sold to Croatia by Chile on 7 December 1991, when the former country was under a United Nations' embargo because of the support for Croatia war in Yugoslavia.
- Piñeragate (1992) – political espionage and eavesdropping
- Eugenio Berríos (1995) – assassination of a DINA biochemist
- Illegal sales of weapons to Ecuador during the Cenepa war
- Augusto Pinochet's arrest and trial (1998)
- Libro negro de la justicia chilena is prohibited by the Chilean Supreme Court

== 2000s ==
- Inverlink case (2003) – 79 billion pesos swindle against CORFO, a government organization in charge of promoting economic development
- MOP-Gate case (2003) – triangulation of public money to finance payolas to government employees
- Spiniak case (2004) – pedophilia case allegedly involving congressmen and businessmen
- Tragedy of Antuco (2005) – the death of at least 45 soldiers in a military exercise in the mountains that went tragically wrong.
- 2006–2007 Chilean corruption scandals
- Colonia Dignidad – a sect with a history of criminal activity directed by child molester Paul Schäfer
- Empresa de los Ferrocarriles del Estado – questionable management that led to the near bankruptcy of the State Railway Company

== 2010s ==
- 2010 Santiago prison fire killed 81 inmates in Chile's deadliest prison incident
- Karadima case (2010-ongoing) – pedophilia case involving Catholic priest Fernando Karadima and an alleged protection network which includes Cardinal Francisco Javier Errázuriz and businessman Eliodoro Matte.
- Kodama case (2010–11) – The Ministry of Housing and Urban Planning was ready to pay 17,000,000,000 Chilean Pesos (approximately 24,000,000 Euro in 2011) to a building contractor "Kodama" for works that were valued in maximal 3,000,000,000 Chilean Pesos.
- 7.926 students displaced with the closing of Universidad del Mar
- Pedro Velásquéz, second vice president of the Chamber of Deputies of Chile, was suspended by the Ethics Committee after the discovery of a debt of CLP 280-million (roughly US$593,427) that Velásquez owes the commune of Coquimbo via tax fraud.
- Larraín case: Martín Larraín Hurtado, son of Carlos Larraín (senator and president of the right-wing party National Renewal), was acquitted after killing a man in a DUI hit and run. The scandal inspired the film Much Ado About Nothing and the political thriller telenovela Juegos de poder.
- Penta case: irregular financing of political candidates by means of 258 fake records, among them IVA (value-added tax) receipts and payments for fictitious services, adding up to a total of some US$1.2 million. The probe evolved from the FUT-gate
- Caval case: a real estate company, owned to 50% by Michelle Bachelet's daughter-in-law, made US$5,000,000 profit in a transaction based on classified information and influence peddling.
- SQM case SQM Lithium mining company facilitated the payment of campaign contributions by persons submitting false invoices to the tax authorities for work not done. Same legal issues as the Penta Case.
- Corpesca is an ongoing investigation into payments made by the industrial fishery Corpesca to certain politicians to influence the distribution of quotas to each fishing company.
- Milicogate
- Pacogate

== 2020s ==
- Sierra Bella case: purchase of a clinic by the municipality of Santiago at alleged overcharge prices. Additional suspicions of crime have been raised once it became known that the appraisers of the clinic and a high-ranking civil servant of Santiago were both part of a WhatsApp group. The case has been judicialized with of charges of fraud against the treasury (Spanish: fraude al fisco) being pressed against mayor Irací Hassler.
- Democracia Viva case is an ongoing scandal revolving around possible influence peddling and conflict of interests among people with overlapping membership in the non-governmental organization Democracia Viva, the political party Democratic Revolution and the Ministry of Housing and Urbanism. Frauds such as embezzlement and misuse of funds have also been added to the investigation.
- Hermosilla Case is an ongoing tax fraud, bribery and money laundry case under investigation against lawyer Luis Hermosilla. It involves multiple politicians in important roles like former President Sebastian Piñera, Supreme Court Minister Angela Vivanco, and Prosecutor Carlos Palma.

== See also ==
- Politics of Chile
- History of Chile
- List of Chilean coups d'état
- List of massacres in Chile
