= Santa María de Iquique (cantata) =

1970 cantata by Luis Advis and Quilapayún

Studio album by Quilapayún
- Released: 1970
- Recorded: 1970
- Studios: Estudios IRT, Santiago, Chile
- Genres: Nueva canción chilena, Chilean folk, Cantata
- Length: 37:34
- Label: DICAP
- Producer: Luis Advis/Quilapayún

Quilapayún chronology
Quilapayún 4 (1970)	Santa María de Iquique (1970)	Vivir como él (1971)

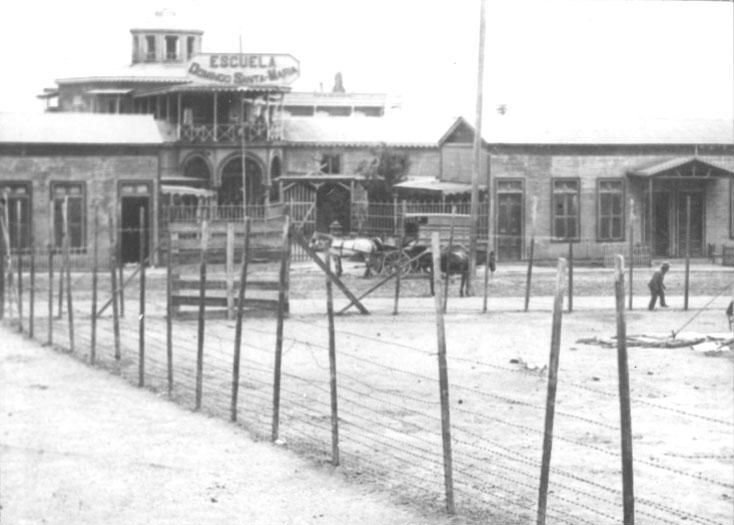
The Domingo Santa María School in Iquique, where the massacre depicted in the cantata took place on 21 December 1907

Santa María de Iquique (also known as Cantata Popular Santa María de Iquique) is a cantata composed in 1969 by Chilean composer Luis Advis and performed primarily by the Chilean folk group Quilapayún. It was released as an album by Quilapayún in 1970 on the Chilean label DICAP. The work combines elements of European art music and Chilean and Latin American folk music with spoken narration, and became one of the most prominent works of the Nueva Canción Chilena movement.

The cantata recounts the events surrounding the Santa María School massacre, in which striking nitrate workers and their families were killed by Chilean military forces at the Domingo Santa María School in Iquique on 21 December 1907. The exact death toll remains uncertain: contemporary official reports gave substantially lower figures, while 3,600 deaths became the number memorialized in the cantata itself.

The recorded version features the actor Héctor Duvauchelle as narrator. The work consists of 18 sections, including five spoken narratives, instrumental passages, two pregones, and seven songs. Its combination of narration and music was modeled on the structure of the traditional cantata while replacing the conventional religious subject matter with a historical and social theme.

== Composition and musical structure ==
The origins of the cantata date to 1968, when Advis visited his native Iquique and subsequently wrote a series of poems. Later that year, the University of Chile's theater institute asked him to compose music for Los que van quedando en el camino, a play by Isidora Aguirre about a massacre of peasants. Advis subsequently combined ideas from that project with his interest in the 1907 massacre at the Santa María School. He used the historical work Reseña histórica de Tarapacá as one of the principal sources for the historical material incorporated into the cantata.

Advis met Quilapayún in 1969. According to the Biblioteca Nacional de Chile, he composed the cantata in November of that year and subsequently gave the group the material to prepare for performance. The work was completed and rehearsed during the first half of 1970.

Advis conceived the work in the general form of a classical cantata, but modified several of its conventions. The traditional religious subject was replaced by a historical social subject, while the recitative was replaced by spoken narration. The musical language combines elements derived from European art music with melodic, harmonic and rhythmic elements associated with Latin American folk traditions. The instrumentation includes cello and double bass together with guitars, quenas, charango and bombo legüero.

The work contains 18 sections. These alternate between spoken narratives, songs and instrumental passages, creating a continuous dramatic account of the workers' arrival in Iquique, the confrontation with the authorities, and the massacre. The five narratives are performed by a narrator rather than sung, while the songs give different perspectives to the workers and their families. The original recording includes the following sections:

1. "Pregón"
2. "Preludio instrumental"
3. "Relato I"
4. "Canción I: El sol en desierto grande"
5. "Interludio instrumental I"
6. "Relato II"
7. "Canción II: Vamos mujer"
8. "Interludio instrumental II"
9. "Relato III"
10. "Interludio cantado"
11. "Relato IV"
12. "Canción III: Soy obrero pampino"
13. "Interludio instrumental III"
14. "Relato V"
15. "Canción letanía"
16. "Canción IV: A los hombres de la pampa"
17. "Pregón"
18. "Canción final"

The structure was unusual within the Nueva Canción Chilena movement because of its scale and its deliberate combination of art-music techniques with folk instrumentation and political subject matter. The work has subsequently been regarded as one of the emblematic compositions of Chilean popular music.

== Premiere and recording ==
Santa María de Iquique was premiered by Quilapayún in 1970. The work was presented at the Segundo Festival de la Nueva Canción Chilena in August 1970 at the Estadio Chile, now known as the Estadio Víctor Jara. The festival performance featured actor Marcelo Romo as narrator. The version subsequently recorded for DICAP used Héctor Duvauchelle instead, whose narration became the best-known recorded version. Actor Roberto Parada later also performed the spoken sections in live presentations of the work.

The recording was made in 1970 at the IRT studios in Santiago. The performers were Eduardo Carrasco, Carlos Quezada, Guillermo "Willy" Oddó, Patricio Castillo, Hernán Gómez and Rodolfo Parada, with Duvauchelle as narrator. Eduardo Sienkiewicz played cello and Luis Bignon played double bass.

The album was issued by DICAP in 1970 as a 12-inch 33⅓-rpm record. It was subsequently reissued in other formats, including cassette, 8-track and compact disc.

== Historical subject ==
The cantata is based on the Santa María School massacre, one of the most significant episodes in the history of the Chilean labor movement. In December 1907, nitrate workers in the Tarapacá nitrate fields went on strike and traveled to Iquique to press demands concerning wages and working conditions. Their demands included payment in money rather than company-issued tokens, improvements to the exchange rate used to calculate wages, and changes to the operation of company stores.

The strikers and their families were eventually concentrated at the Domingo Santa María School in central Iquique. On 21 December, Chilean military forces opened fire on the workers. The Archivo Nacional records that a first volley was ordered at 15:45 and that survivors were subsequently removed from the school and taken to the Club Hípico.

The number of people killed remains disputed. A telegram sent by the provincial intendant shortly after the massacre reported 30 workers killed and 70 wounded. A subsequent report by General Roberto Silva Renard gave a combined figure of approximately 140 dead or wounded, while an official investigation completed in January 1908 recorded 126 dead and 135 wounded. The figure of 3,600 deaths, which appears in the cantata's "Canción letanía", became an important part of the event's later cultural memory, despite the lack of documentary evidence establishing that number.

The cantata does not attempt to present a neutral reconstruction of the massacre. It uses the historical episode as the basis for a work about labor exploitation, political repression and collective memory. Its final sections turn from the events of 1907 toward a broader appeal for solidarity and resistance, helping explain the work's importance within the political and cultural context of the Nueva Canción Chilena.

== Reception and significance ==
Santa María de Iquique became one of the best-known works of the Nueva Canción Chilena. The Biblioteca Nacional de Chile describes it as one of the emblematic musical works of the movement and notes that its combination of folk and art music, together with its social subject matter, helped establish the form that subsequently became known as the popular cantata.

The work was initially controversial within the Nueva Canción movement because its elaborate structure and classical musical influences did not conform neatly to contemporary ideas about popular or folkloric music. Nevertheless, its successful reception established it as one of the movement's major works. The cantata subsequently became closely associated with the political culture surrounding the Popular Unity period, although Advis himself was not a member of a political party.

The album was ranked fourth in the Chilean edition of Rolling Stone magazine's 2008 list of the 50 greatest Chilean albums.

== 1978 re-recording ==
Following the 1973 Chilean coup d'état, the original master tapes of the recording were destroyed, and Quilapayún went into exile in Europe. The group subsequently recorded a new version of the cantata in 1978.

For the 1978 recording, Quilapayún commissioned the Argentine writer Julio Cortázar to modify portions of Advis's text. The group also made musical changes to the arrangement. Advis had not been consulted about the alterations and strongly objected to them on artistic grounds. Musicological analysis of the 1978 version has identified changes in the instrumental treatment, including a more overtly folkloric approach to some passages.

Quilapayún recorded the revised version twice, but subsequently returned to performing Advis's original version. The 1978 recording is treated as a separate version of the work rather than a replacement for the original composition.

== Later performances ==
After the return of democracy in Chile, Quilapayún continued to perform the cantata. On 1 November 1997, the group performed it at the former nitrate works of Santa Laura, near Iquique, in a concert that included Héctor Noguera as narrator and Gabriela Olivares on cello.

The work has also been performed and recorded by other artists and ensembles. Its continued performance has contributed to the preservation of the 1907 massacre in Chilean cultural memory and to the broader dissemination of the Nueva Canción Chilena tradition.

== Personnel ==
=== Quilapayún ===
- Eduardo Carrasco
- Rodolfo Parada
- Willy Oddó
- Carlos Quezada
- Patricio Castillo
- Hernán Gómez

=== Additional personnel ===
- Héctor Duvauchelle – narrator
- Eduardo Sienkiewicz – cello
- Luis Bignon – double bass

== Track listing ==
All compositions by Luis Advis.

No.	Title	Length
1	"Pregón"	2:11
2	"Preludio instrumental"	5:45
3	"Relato I"	2:11
4	"Canción I: El sol en desierto grande"	2:21
5	"Interludio instrumental I"	1:33
6	"Relato II"	1:21
7	"Canción II: Vamos mujer"	2:08
8	"Interludio instrumental II"	1:44
9	"Relato III"	1:35
10	"Interludio cantado"	2:05
11	"Relato IV"	1:00
12	"Canción III: Soy obrero pampino"	1:44
13	"Interludio instrumental III"	1:55
14	"Relato V"	2:14
15	"Canción letanía"	1:33
16	"Canción IV: A los hombres de la pampa"	2:55
17	"Pregón"	0:32
18	"Canción final"	2:50
