= List of massacres in Chile =

The following is a list of massacres that have occurred in Chile (numbers may be approximate):

== Political or historical massacres ==
Name	Date	Location	Deaths	Injuries	Notes
Wulaia massacre	6 November 1859	Bahía Wulaia, Navarino Island	8	0	Murder of eight unarmed Europeans by about three hundred Yaghans
Meat riots	22–24 October 1905	Santiago de Chile	250	Unknown	
Plaza Colón massacre	6 February 1906	Antofagasta	48 - 300	Unknown	an undetermined number of workers who were on a general strike were killed by Order Guard and Sailors of the armored frigate Blanco Encalada while they were gathered in Plaza Colón.
Santa María School massacre	21 December 1907	Iquique	2000	Unknown	
Forrahue massacre	21 October 1912	Forrahue, near Osorno	15	Unknown	Killing of Mapuche-Huilliche farmers by Chilean police
Marusia massacre	March 1925	Antofagasta	500	Unknown	
Ranquil massacre	June–July 1934	Alto Biobío	477	Unknown	
Seguro Obrero massacre	5 September 1938	Santiago de Chile	60	2	The police, allegedly on presidential orders, massacred Chilean fascists who were members of the National Socialist Movement of Chile following a failed coup
Massacre of Puerto Montt	9 March 1969	Llanquihue	10	70	
Laja massacre	18 September 1973	Laja and San Rosendo	19	Unknown	
Operation Colombo	1975	Chile	119	Unknown	
Cerro Gallo massacre	1975	Cerro Gallo, Colonia Dignidad	21	0	The military squads fired on prisoners who, once dead, were passed off as guerrillas who would have tried to enter Chile from Argentina by crossing the Andes mountain range
Attack on Carol Urzúa	30 August 1983	Las Condes	3	0	At least three members of the Chilean army were killed in an ambush by members of the revolutionary left-wing movement
Caso Degollados	28–30 March 1985	Chile	3	0	
Santiago Penitentiary riot	18 October 1985	Santiago de Chile	8	25	Escape attempt of common prisoners and political prisoners.
Operation Albania	15–16 June 1987	Santiago	12	0	
Apoquindo massacre	21 October 1993	Las Condes	8	12	
2010 Santiago prison fire	8 December 2010	Santiago	81	19	

== Spree killers ==
Date	Location	Deaths	Injuries	Notes
7 June 1957	Valdivia	6	2	Perpetrator was sentenced to life in prison.
20 August 1960	San Carlos	6–7	0	Perpetrator was sentenced to death and executed in 1963.
15 July 1963	Río Bueno	8 (including the perpetrator)	0	Familicide. Perpetrator committed suicide.
17 December 1999	Valparaíso	3	1 (the perpetrator)	Valparaíso school shootings: Perpetrator wounded after he tried committing suicide, but eventually recovered and was acquitted by reason of insanity. Committed suicide in 2011.
16 March 2019	Iquique	3 (including the perpetrator)	0	Iquique military school shooting: Perpetrator who murdered 2 people and then committed suicide in 2019.
8 August 2019	Puente Alto	5	3	Part of an organized crime dispute. Both perpetrators were sentenced to life imprisonment.
22 December 2024	Santiago	3	3	2024 Santiago shooting: Carlos Muñoz Vega, who opened fire and attacked 3 people and injured 3 others, before being captured, and according to their investigation, Carlos suffered from schizophrenia.
27 March 2026	Calama	1	5 (including the perpetrator)	2026 Calama school stabbing: The student Hernán Meneses Leal, who attacked, leaving one dead and four wounded.
