= Santa María School massacre =

1907 massacre of mine workers in Chile

Coordinates: 20.2178°S 70.1471°W

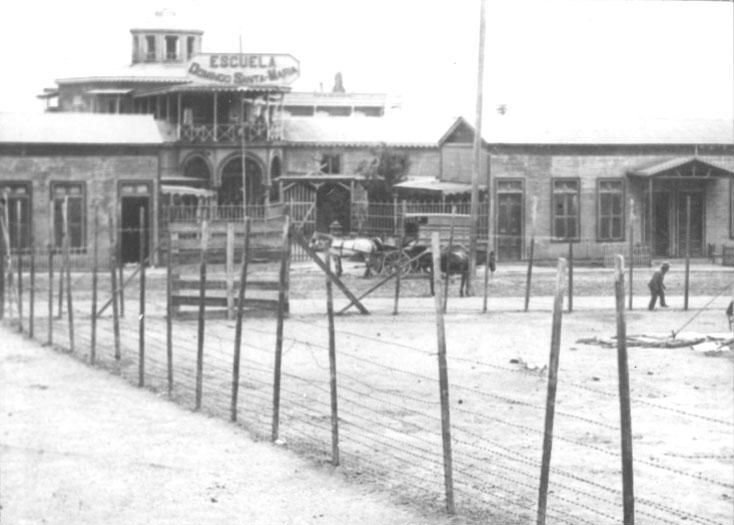
- Santa María School of Iquique in 1907
Date	21 December 1907
Location	Iquique, Chile
Result	Demands of the workers rejected, strike repressed, Chilean government victory

Belligerents
Chilean workers	Government of Chile: Chilean Army

Commanders and leaders
	Pedro Montt; Roberto Silva Renard

Casualties and losses
2,000–3,500 killed (not confirmed)	none

Santa María School massacre DjVu file

The Santa María School massacre (Spanish: Matanza de la Escuela Santa María de Iquique) was a massacre of striking workers, mostly saltpeter works (nitrate) miners, along with their wives and children, committed by the Chilean Army in Iquique, Chile, on December 21, 1907. The number of victims is undetermined but is estimated to be over 2,000. The massacre occurred during the peak of the nitrate mining era, which coincided with the Parliamentary Period in Chilean political history (1891–1925). With the massacre and an ensuing reign of terror, not only was the strike broken, but the workers' movement was thrown into limbo for over a decade. For decades afterwards, there was official suppression of knowledge of the incident, but in 2007 the government conducted a highly publicized commemoration of its centenary, including an official national day of mourning and the reinterment of the victims' remains.

The site of the massacre was the Domingo Santa María School, (Note: named after former Chilean president Santa María) where thousands of miners from different nitrate mines in Chile's far north had been camping for a week after converging on Iquique, the regional capital, to appeal for government intervention to improve their living and working conditions. Rafael Sotomayor Gaete, the minister of the interior, decided to crush the strike, by army assault if need be. On December 21, 1907, the commander of the troops at the scene, General Roberto Silva Renard, in accordance with this plan, informed the strikers' leaders that the strikers had one hour to disband or be fired upon. When the time was up and the leaders and the multitude stood firm, Renard gave his troops the order to fire. An initial volley that felled the negotiators was followed by a hail of rifle and machine gun fire aimed at the multitude of strikers and their accompanying wives and children.

== Historical background ==
Chilean society faced a crisis from the late 19th century onwards: what was delicately referred to at the time as the "social question"—namely, "the problem of worsening living and working conditions in the country's mining centers and major cities" The nitrate miners' strike of December 1907 was the last of a series of strikes and other forms of unrest that began in 1902, chief among them being the strike in Valparaíso in 1903 and the meat riots in Santiago in 1905. In Chile, the workers' movement in general, and syndicalism in particular, got started among the nitrate miners.

Geographically, the region Chileans today have come to refer to as the Norte Grande (Big North) lies within the Atacama Desert, the driest region on Earth. The Norte Grande and the Norte Chico immediately to the south belong to the Chilean pampa, a vast plain located between the Pacific Ocean and the western foothills of the Andes mountains. The Norte Grande, which administratively consisted (before 1974) of the two provinces of Tarapacá and Antofagasta, (Note: Under the administrative structure of Chile as of 2007, the Norte Grande includes what are now termed the Regions of Tarapacá, Antofagasta, and Arica and Parinacota. The latter region was created in 2007 by subdividing the Tarapacá Region.) had been seized by Chile from Bolivia and Peru in the War of the Pacific (1879–1884), giving Chile an area rich in minerals, principally copper and saltpeter (sodium nitrate). Tensions provoked by the control of the mines had been one of the leading causes of the 1891 Chilean Civil War, when pro-Congress forces triumphed.

The mining of nitrate had become the mainstay of the nation's economy at the end of the 19th century, Chile being the exclusive producer worldwide. According to the census of November 28, 1907, Tarapacá Province held 110,000 inhabitants. In the provinces of Tarapacá and Antofagasta about 40,000 workers were active in the nitrate industry, of whom about 13,000 came from Bolivia and Peru.

Life in the mining camps—a nitrate works was known locally as an oficina, "office", a term whose use extended to the adjoining settlement—was grueling and physically dangerous. The enterprises exercised a severe control over the life and working conditions inside the mines, which rendered the workers extremely vulnerable to arbitrary actions perpetrated by the owners. Each oficina was a company town in which the mine owner owned the workers' housing, owned the company store (known in Chile as a pulpería), monopolized all commerce, and employed a private police force. Each mining camp ran its own money system, paying its workers in tokens, which could be spent only within the mining camp. Mine managers frequently put off paydays for up to three months.

At the beginning of the 20th century, the above mentioned "social question" prompted unrest among the workers at the nitrate oficinas in the Tarapacá Province. They began to mobilize politically, repeatedly petitioning the national government in Santiago to get involved and bring about improvements in their dreadful living and working conditions. The Parliamentary Period governments, however, were reluctant to intervene in negotiations between employers and workers, and they tended to see large scale workers' movements (especially if accompanied by massive demonstrations) as incipient rebellions.

== The 18 Pence Strike and the massacre ==
On December 10, 1907, a general strike broke out in Tarapacá Province. This was the start of the 18 Pence Strike (la huelga de los 18 peniques), the name referring to the size of the wage being demanded by workers in one particular mining occupation, workers known as jornaleros. A large contingent of strikers traveled to the provincial capital, the port city of Iquique, carrying the flags of Chile, Peru, Bolivia, and Argentina. As workers from other nitrate works swelled the ranks of this movement, nearly all commerce and industry in the north of the country was brought to a halt. The demands published by the strikers on December 16 in a memorial were as follows:

*While the tokens are being abolished and pay is starting to be given in legal tender, each oficina, its Manager representing it and pledging compliance, shall agree to accept tokens from every other oficina on a par with its own, paying a fine of 50,000 pesos for every refusal to do so.

*A day's work to be paid at a fixed wage of 18 pence. Broad and absolute freedom of commerce at the nitrate works.

*General covering with iron grates of all ore cooking vats (cachuchos) and settling vats (chulladores) (Note: For definitions of these mining terms, see the web site, Pioneros del Salitre (in Spanish)) in the nitrate works, on pain of an indemnity of from 5,000 to 10,000 pesos to each worker who is injured as a result of noncompliance with this provision.

*At each nitrate works there shall be a balance and a bar placed outdoors alongside the company store to compare weights and measures.

*Venues will be provided free of charge for holding night schools for workers, at their request.

*The Supervisor may not load confiscated [sic] ore into the ore cooking vats. (Editorial Note: the point of this demand was that mine managers were in the practice of cheating the workers by refining the discarded low quality pieces of crushed ore, and getting some little yield from them, without paying the workers corresponding piece rates.)

*Neither the Supervisor nor any works employee shall dismiss workers or their leaders who have taken part in the present movement without advance notice of between two and three months, or alternatively an indemnity between 300 and 500 pesos.

*In the future, a 15-day advance notice will be obligatory for workers and bosses in the event of a contract termination.

*Upon acceptance of these terms, they will be put into writing and signed by the managements and by the workers' designated representatives.

On December 16, thousands of striking workers from other industries arrived at Iquique in support of the nitrate miners' demands upon the provincial authorities, with the aim of prodding the authorities to act. Previous entreaties to the government, in particular petitions presented by delegations in 1901, 1903, and 1904, had been fruitless.

The national government in Santiago sent extra regiments by land and sea to reinforce the two regiments stationed in Iquique. President Pedro Montt appointed Renard to handle the situation. Silva Renard, under confidential orders from the minister of the interior, Rafael Sotomayor, was ordered to use all necessary means to force the miners to dissolve and return to work.

More and more worker contingents joined the strike by the day. It has been estimated that by December 21 the strikers in Iquique numbered ten to twelve thousand. Soon after the journeys to Iquique began, this great conglomeration of workers met in Manuel Montt plaza and at the Santa María School, asking the government to mediate between them and the bosses of the foreign (English) nitrate firms to resolve their demands. For their part, the bosses refused to negotiate until the workers went back to work.

The acting intendant of Tarapacá Province, Julio Guzmán García, mediated negotiations with representatives of the pampinos (plains dwellers) until the arrival at the port December 19 of the titular intendant, Carlos Eastman Quiroga, and General Roberto Silva Renard, chief of the First Military Zone of the Chilean Army, accompanied by Colonel Sinforoso Ledesma. Their arrival was cheered by the workers because a nitrate miners' petition to the government nearly two years earlier, under the previous president, had received an encouraging response, although the demands had not been satisfied. But the interior ministry felt no solidarity with the demands of the strikers. The ministry relayed orders to the strikers to leave the plaza and the school and gather at the horse racing track, where they were to board trains and return to work. They refused, sensing that if they went back to work, their requests would be ignored.

In the face of the growing tension between the groups, on December 20, 1907, the strikers' representatives held a meeting with Intendant Eastman. Simultaneously, a decree published in the press announced the declaration of a state of siege, which entailed the suspension of constitutional rights. While the meeting with Intendant Eastman was taking place in the Buenaventura nitrate works, a group of workers and their families tried to leave the spot, but troops opened fire on them by the railroad tracks and kept shooting. As a result, six workers died and the rest of the group was wounded.

The funerals of the slain workers were held the next day, December 21, 1907. Immediately at their conclusion, all workers were ordered to leave the school premises and vicinity and relocate to the Club Hípico (Horse Club). The workers refused to go, fearing they might be bombarded by the guns of warships which were lined up alongside the road they would have to travel.

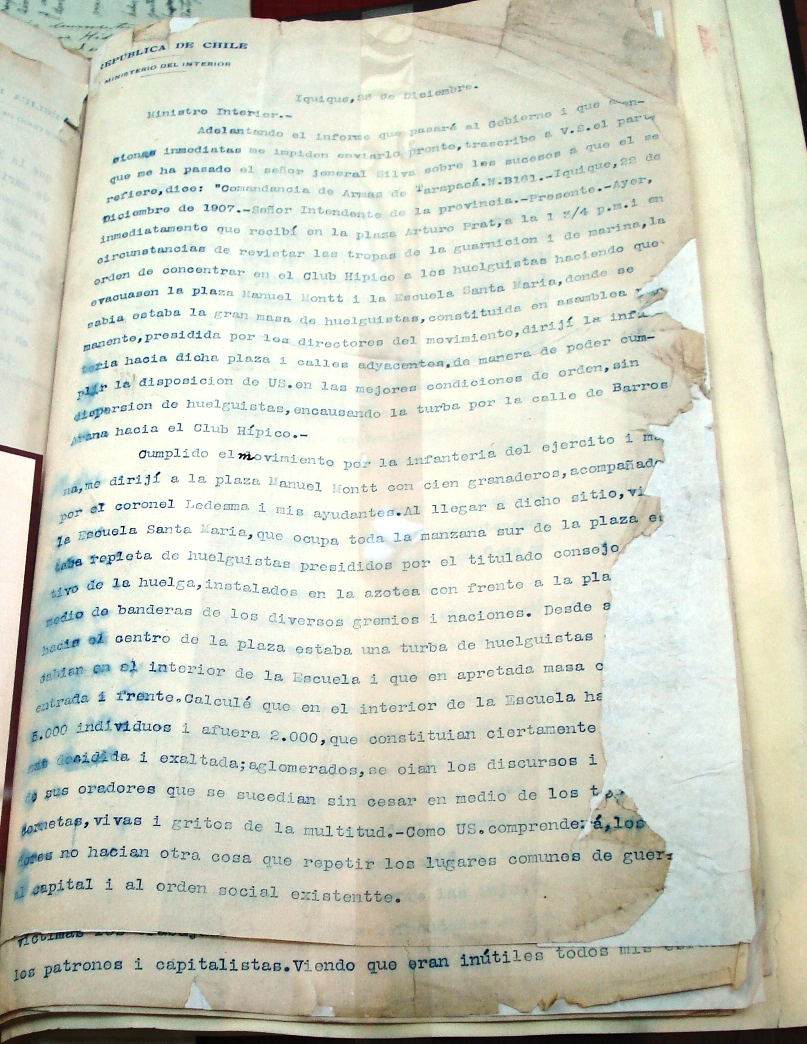
General Roberto Silva Renard's account of the massacre. Collection of the Archivo Nacional de Chile.

At 2:30 in the afternoon, Renard told the leaders of the workers' committee that if the strikers did not start heading back to work within one hour, the troops would open fire on them. The workers' leaders refused to go, and only a small group of strikers left the plaza.

At the hour indicated by Renard, he ordered the soldiers to shoot the workers' leaders, who were on the school's roof, and they fell dead with the first volley. The multitude, desperate and trying to escape, surged toward the soldiers, and were fired upon with rifles and machine guns. After a period of firing from the Manuel Montt plaza, the troops stormed school grounds with machine guns, firing into the school's playgrounds and classrooms, killing in a frenzy without regard to the women and children screaming for mercy. The survivors of the massacre were brought at saber point to the Club Hípico, whence they were sent back to work and subjected to a reign of terror.

== Victims ==
The government ordered that death certificates not be issued for the fallen and had them buried in a mass grave in the city cemetery. The remains were not exhumed until 1940. They were reinterred in the courtyard of the Legal Medical Service of that city.

The number of victims claimed by the action is disputed. On one hand, the official report of General Silva Renard speaks at first of 140 dead, later to rise to 195. This is the number offered by a witness to the massacre, Nicolás Palacios, a physician in the mines and a political dissident of national renown. However, this figure is considered unrealistic given the number of workers present. The highest estimate has been 3,600, although this is considered speculative.

== Consequences ==
General Silva Renard reported to the government in Santiago as to what happened, minimizing his role and laying responsibility on the strikers. The National Congress's reaction was lukewarm.

Improvements in the conditions of the workers came slowly. It would not be until 1920 that minimum labor standards started to be enacted, such as mandating payment in legal tender and setting the maximum length of the working day. Renard was seriously wounded in 1914 in an assassination attempt on the part of a Spanish anarchist, Antonio Ramón, whose brother, Manuel Vaca, had been one of the victims of the massacre. Renard would die a few years later as a result of these injuries.

== 100th anniversary observances ==
On the occasion of the centenary of the massacre a mausoleum was inaugurated in the local cemetery, where the remains of one victim and one survivor of the massacre were re-interred. Public exhibits were mounted. President Bachelet decreed a national day of mourning for December 21, 2007.

== Cultural influence ==
The facts of the massacre were suppressed by the government for many years. With the passage of time, its tragic details inspired singers and poets, while its social effects were investigated from the middle of the 20th century on. Chief among these artistic and academic works are:

Books

- 1915 – Francisco Pezoa, Canto a la Pampa
- 1952 – Volodia Teitelboim, Hijo del salitre, novel.
- 2002 – Hernán Rivera Letelier, Santa María de las flores negras.

Music

- 1970 – Luis Advis, Cantata de Santa María de Iquique. (performed by Héctor Duvauchelle and Quilapayún)
- 2009 – Luis Advis, Cantata Rock de Santa María de Iquique. (performed by Colectivo Cantata Rock)
- 2011 – Diablo Swing Orchestra, Justice for Saint Mary

Theater

- 2004 – La Patogallina troupe, 1907.
- 2007 – Teatro del Oráculo troupe, Santa María de Iquique: La Venganza de Ramón Ramón.

Film

- 1975 – Humberto Solás, Cantata de Chile

== See also ==
- Humberstone and Santa Laura Saltpeter Works
- List of massacres in Chile
- Marusia massacre
- Forrahue massacre
- Santa María de Iquique (cantata)
- List of saltpeter works in Tarapacá and Antofagasta
