= Antonio Ramón =

Spanish anarchist (born 1879)

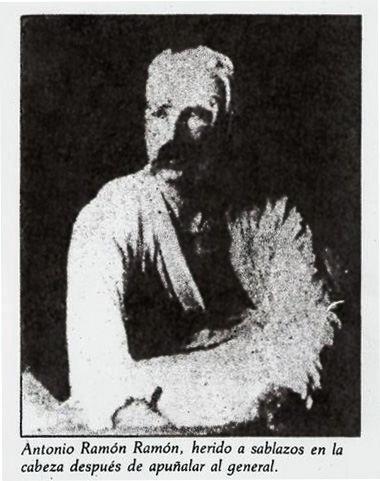
- Antonio Ramón, 1914
- Born: November 13, 1879
- Known for: execution attempt against colonel Roberto Silva Renard
- Movement: Anarchism

Antonio Ramón Ramón (13 November 1879 - c. 1924) was a Spanish anarchist. He was born in the town of Molvizar, in Granada, Spain. He is mostly known for his execution attempt against Colonel Roberto Silva Renard in the aftermath of Santa María de Iquique Massacre in which Ramón's half-brother had died.

== Santa María of Iquique School massacre ==
The bloodiest massacre in Chile's history occurred on 21 December 1907. Workers in the nitrate mines, a leading industry owned largely by foreign (British and German) capital, struck on 4 December demanding humane working conditions and higher wages. By the 13th a general work stoppage in all the nitrate mines was announced. The miners were Bolivian, Argentine, Peruvian as well as Chileans. 18,000 workers, together with wives and children marched without food and water to the port of Iquique to seek support. On the 14th, the maritime workers joined them in the strike.

President Pedro Montt appointed Colonel Roberto Silva Renard to handle the situation. Renard, under confidential orders from the minister of the interior, Rafael Sotomayor ordered the miners to dissolve and return to work. When the miners refused, he ordered the Army to fire into the miner's encampment at the schoolyard of the Domingo Santa María school. The official report was 140 deaths and 200 injured, but the real estimates range between 1,100 and 3,500 men, women and children killed. Renard was promoted to Brigadier General as a reward for his defense of democracy, law and order.

== The assassin ==
Among the dead at the Santa María massacre was Manuel Vaca, a Spanish immigrant worker. Antonio Ramón was his half-brother, and the two were very close. At the time of the massacre, Ramón was living in Argentina, but when news stopped arriving from his brother, he travelled to Iquique to find out what had happened. There is some evidence that he already had plans to revenge himself, as he bought a dagger and some strychnine.

Revenge for the Santa María massacre was the reason Ramón arrived in Chile from Argentina, using his own identity. Ramón finally decided to take action seven years later. He found General Silva Renard walking alone to his office, in Viel street in Santiago, on 14 December 1914, and stabbed him seven times on his back and head. Renard started shouting “Murderer! Murderer!” and several passersby came to his help.

Ramón, in turn, stopped the attack and tried to run away, only to be captured by an off-duty prison guard named Perfecto Salazar Acevedo. When Ramón saw himself surrounded and all escapes blocked, he drank the bottle of strychnine he was carrying, but vomited most of it and was unharmed. Once in custody, Ramón vehemently denied other parties' involvement in the assassination, and the worker's held public campaigns to raise money for his defense. He was eventually sentenced to five years in prison.

Renard survived the attack, but suffered permanent effects from the injuries: he lost all movement of half of his face, became blind, and was mostly an invalid until his death in 1920. Ramón was released in 1919 and all track of him was lost afterwards.
