= Squatting in Chile =

Occupation of unused land or derelict buildings without the permission of the owner

Territory of Chile in yellow

Squatting in Chile is the occupation of unused land or derelict buildings without the permission of the owner. From the 1960s onwards, informal settlements known as callampas were permitted although there were also evictions such as the massacre of Puerto Montt in 1969. In the 1970s, the government of Salvador Allende encouraged occupations, then following the coup d'état, the military junta repressed squatting. Callampas then became known as campamentos.

In the 1990s a program was begun to house all people living shanty towns. By 2007, 85.5% of the squatters identified in 1996 had been housed although there were also 20,000 new squatters. In 2018, there were 822 campamentos in which 46,423 families lived. Squatting is also used as a tactic by migrants occupying land near the Peruvian border, by indigenous Rapa Nui people on Easter Island and by anarchists in the capital Santiago.

== History ==
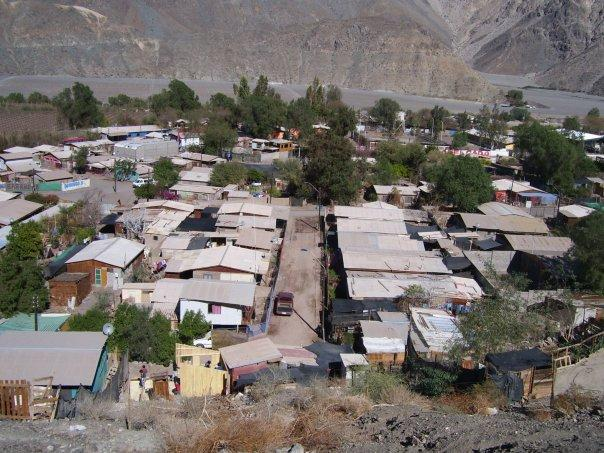
A campamento

In Chile, the government of Eduardo Frei Montalva (1964–1970) began to permit shanty towns. The need for housing had been shown when 10,000 people squatted a delayed construction project in the capital Santiago in 1961. The massacre of Puerto Montt occurred in 1969, when an eviction of a land occupation resulted in ten deaths. Between 1967 and 1972, there were 312 occupations, housing almost 55,000 people.

The government of Salvador Allende (1970–1973) encouraged occupations, then following the 1973 Chilean coup d'état, the military junta repressed squatters. The squatter settlements on the edge of cities were known as callampas. Over the decades, the term changed to campamento. Another phenomenon is the inner-city slum, originally known as conventillo.

In the mid-1990s, the ruling Concertación coalition introduced Chile Barrio, a plan to house all squatters by 2002. The program was then extended to 2007, by which time it had placed 85.5% of the squatters identified in 1996 into subsidized housing. However, the Ministry of Housing and Urban Development (MINVU) had profiled over 20,000 new squatters and therefore a new program called Línea de Atención a Campamentos (LAC or Focus on Settlements) was set up.

== Recent ==
According to figures released by the MINVU in 2011, there were 657 campamentos across Chile, in which 27,378 families lived and in 2018, there were 822 campamentos, where 46,423 families lived. In the north of the country near to the border with Peru, there are informal settlements created by Bolivian and Peruvian migrants, such as the Granaderos and El Resplandor towns on the edge of the city of Arica.

Anarchism in Chile is connected to self-managed social centres, several of which were raided and evicted in 2010, such as Johny Cariqueo in Pudahuel and Biblioteca Sacco y Vanzetti in Santiago. Easter Island is a special territory of Chile. In 2010, indigenous Rapa Nui people squatted government buildings in a land dispute and were evicted by police who used batons and buckshot rounds. During the COVID-19 pandemic in Chile, high rates of unemployment led to a boom in informal settlements as people became unable to pay rent.
