= Corruption in Chile =

In Transparency International's 2025 Corruption Perceptions Index, Chile was ranked number 31 among the 182 countries in the Index, where the country ranked number 1 is perceived to have the most honest public sector. It was ranked seventh among the countries of the Americas, behind Canada, Uruguay, Barbados, the United States, the Bahamas and Saint Vincent and the Grenadines. (Note: Argentina, Bahamas, Barbados, Belize, Bolivia, Brazil, Canada, Chile, Colombia, Costa Rica, Cuba, Dominica, Dominican Republic, Ecuador, El Salvador, Grenada, Guatemala, Guyana, Haiti, Honduras, Jamaica, Mexico, Nicaragua, Panama, Paraguay, Peru, Saint Lucia, Saint Vincent and the Grenadines, Suriname, Trinidad and Tobago, United States of America, Uruguay, Venezuela)

In that index, Chile was given a score of 63 on a scale from 0 ("highly corrupt") to 100 ("very clean"). For comparison with regional scores, the best score among the countries of the Americas was 75, the average score was 42 and the worst score was 10. For comparison with worldwide scores, the best score was 89 (ranked 1), the average score was 42, and the worst score was 9 (ranked 181, in a two-way tie).

According to a 2021 study, the regions of Ñuble, Los Lagos and Aysén are the most susceptible suffering nepotism and elite capture.

== Corruption in Chile ==
In December 2005, the mayor of Quillota, Luis Mella (Christian Democrat), alleged the government's Job-Making Program (PGE) paid political allies for work that was not performed. The Public Ministry and the comptroller then initiated parallel investigations into the potential illicit use of public funds. Although earmarked for employment programs, these resources were possibly diverted to the political campaigns of Socialist Party and Party for Democracy candidates in the Fifth Region during the 2005 congressional elections. The PGE investigations revealed that individuals paid to do public works actually spent their time campaigning for political parties.

Further investigations revealed that funds were also misused in other Fifth Region counties. Many midlevel public officials in the regional government, such as the former regional ministerial secretary of labor, were formally investigated, and several local officials were removed.

The government took remedial steps to control public employment programs, dismantling the PGE and designating three government agencies to manage recruitment of public works employers and workers and payment of wages.

In October, a government audit revealed financial irregularities in Chiledeportes, a national program to promote amateur and professional sport activities. Opposition political figures charged that the funds had been diverted into the national political campaigns of ruling party figures, while the organization's director characterized the issue as "a common crime."

The government removed all 13 Chiledeportes regional directors and initiated a broad-based investigation to determine the extent and nature of potential fraud or mismanagement. Congress created an investigative committee in February, and prosecutors brought charges of tax evasion and falsification of documents against some individuals. Executive, congressional, and judicial investigations were ongoing at year's end.

The Freedom of Information Act requires the government and its agencies to make all unclassified information about their activities available to the public. All government ministries and most public agencies have Web pages. In 2005, the NGO Participa released the results of a far-ranging survey, which found that national and local government agencies failed to respond to 69 percent of requests for information and provided incomplete or otherwise deficient responses to 14 percent of requests.

== 2006–2007 Chilean corruption scandals ==
The 2006–2007 Chilean corruption scandals were a series of events that affected the Chilean governing Concertación coalition in 2006 and 2007.

=== Chiledeportes ===
In October 2006, it was discovered that 90% of the projects of Chiledeportes, the government's sports organization, had some sort of anomaly: either initiatives that were never started or false and nonexistent identities. The investigation into this mystery led to the arrest of Juan Michel, a prominent member of the Christian Democrat Party. Later, it was discovered that much of the money that went to Chiledeportes' Valparaíso Region branch was used to finance the political campaigns of Concertación members, mainly those of Party for Democracy deputies Laura Soto and Rodrigo González Torres. Twenty people were arrested because of this misuse of government funds.

=== Publicam ===
The crisis continued when it was discovered that Senator Guido Girardi, of the Party for Democracy, had used false bills from a nonexistent company, Publicam, in order to justify his campaign expenses to the Servicio de Impuestos Internos (Internal Tax Service). Some of the members of Girardi's campaign team, among them his lawyer, Dante Leoz, were arrested and accused of financial fraud. Girardi himself is currently under investigation, but there have been no charges. He has denied charges of corruption, but admits that he should have studied his campaign expenses more carefully.

Senator Fernando Flores, who leads the more liberal faction of the Party for Democracy, temporarily suspended his membership in the party, saying that it was ruled by a corrupt "gang". He later decided to rejoin, but in 2007, he resigned from the party permanently (see below).

The right-wing opposition (the Alliance for Chile) likened the Chiledeportes and Publicam cases to previous corruption scandals that took place during the administration of Ricardo Lagos. Former presidential candidate Sebastián Piñera (who was later also found to be linked to Publicam) said the scandals proved the government had few qualms about committing electoral fraud and intervention. Likewise, former presidential candidate Joaquín Lavín said that the victory of Lagos by a razor-thin 2.62% margin in 2000 could have been due to election fraud. No proof was ever given for such a claim.

=== Whistleblowers ===
The crisis deepened when Edgardo Boeninger, a Christian Democrat and former minister secretary general of the presidency, said in an interview with influential Chilean newspaper El Mercurio that "since the beginning of the Concertación it was thought that, since the private sector's money favored the right-wing parties, it would not be illegitimate to receive public [government] money.". His declarations were supported by former deputy Jorge Schaulsohn, founder and former president of the Party for Democracy. Also in an interview with El Mercurio, Schaulsohn said that during the time he presided over his party, all four parties of the Concertación coalition received money from the government. Additionally, Schaulsohn reported that government money had also been used to directly finance the campaigns of Concertación candidates. He accused the government and the Concertación of an "ideology of corruption".

Lastly, former president and deputy of the Socialist Party Gonzalo Martner, in another interview with El Mercurio, declared that Schaulsohn's accusations were correct, and that "public resources were used to finance the activities of the political parties [of the Concertación]".

All the leaders of the Concertación denied the charges of Boeninger, Schaulsohn, and Martner. However, in El Mercurio, former president Patricio Aylwin acknowledged that some ministers in his cabinet had been paid extra money that came from government reserved funds, though he denied the charges of an "ideology of corruption". Other former government officials agreed with these three whistleblowers.

=== Crisis in the PPD ===
Although all the parties denied receiving money from the government, only the Party for Democracy (PPD) took action against the whistleblowers. The Supreme Tribunal of the party requested that Schaulsohn testify and present evidence of corruption. Instead, Schaulsohn wrote a report stating his opinions. On December 28, the Tribunal decided to dismiss Schaulsohn from the party. This act caused outrage among many Concertación members, some of whom likened the Tribunal's decision to Stalin's purges. Many wondered why Schaulsohn had been dismissed but no such action was undertaken for Girardi, who is under investigation by the police for corruption. Former Minister of Public Works Juan Etcheberry resigned in protest of the "Stalinist" action of the Tribunal in dismissing Schaulsohn.

Senator Flores was one of the prime opponents of the Tribunal's decision. Because of the influence he wields in the party, it was expected that if he resigned, many other members, including more than a few deputies, would resign with him. Flores spoke with Schaulsohn at length during the time both of them stayed in the United States in the New Year (Flores has a family in California and Schaulsohn was in New York City). His conferences with the Party of Democracy's president, Sergio Bitar, came to nothing. He then launched an independent political organization called Chile Primero (Chile First) in what many believed to be a prelude to his resignation. He finally submitted his resignation in the morning of January 9, 2006.

=== Effects ===
Former president Michelle Bachelet, who belongs to the Concertación, has said little regarding the corruption scandals. Meanwhile, former president Patricio Aylwin has been the only one to acknowledge that there might have been corruption during his government, although he insists that if there was, it was not an "ideology" as Schaulsohn described it. Former president and current president of the Senate Eduardo Frei has denied there was corruption during his government, and former president Ricardo Lagos has done likewise.

The presidents of the four Concertación parties have all denied that their parties received or have ever received money from the government. The Socialist Party President Camilo Escalona was particularly enraged by Schaulsohn's remarks, and threatened to sue him for libel. Sergio Bitar of the Party for Democracy said he would not interfere with the Tribunal's decision to dismiss Schaulsohn, although he remarked it would've been better if he had not been dismissed. After Flores' resignation, Bitar declared that he had done "everything possible" to maintain party unity and that any "responsibility" lay on those who voluntarily left. Bitar maintained he hoped to have positive relations with Flores despite the latter's resignation. The next day, Flores's supporter and deputy Esteban Valenzuela also resigned.

=== Investigations ===
The opposition Alliance for Chile pressed for investigations regarding the recent discoveries of corruption. The case is currently being investigated by Judge Macarena Rubilar, of the Second Criminal Court of Santiago. On January 6, she called Boeninger, Martner, and Genaro Arriagada (the latter had also spoken of corruption in the government) to testify. Schaulsohn testified before Judge Carlos Aránguiz of the Court of Appeals of Rancagua on January 10, upon his return from a New Year's trip to New York City.

Meanwhile, the Alliance for Chile requested the creation of an investigative commission regarding the corruption in the Chamber of Deputies. The commission was originally headed by Nicolás Monckeberg, of the opposition, but the Concertación members of the commission requested that Monckeberg be censured for his supposedly "overaggressive" interrogation of the chairman of Chiledeportes, Catalina Depassier. Monckeberg denied that he mistreated Depassier and the Alliance accused the Concertación of trying to halt the investigations. When Monckeberg was finally replaced by Enrique Jaramillo (a member of the Concertación), the Alliance withdrew from the commission in protest.

Instead, the Alliance decided to do their own investigation into the corruption, and presented their report the same day the Concertación presented the official one. The Alliance's report was much more critical than the official one, and accused PPD deputies Rodrigo González, Marco Antonio Núñez, Laura Soto, and Socialist deputy Marco Enríquez-Ominami of having been involved in corruption during their election campaigns. The official report limited itself to blaming the former independent of Valparaíso, Luis Guastavino. When the Chamber voted to accept the official report, the Christian Democrats decided to abstain, declaring that the electoral fraud and intervention that was uncovered benefited the Party of Democracy and the Socialist Party. Therefore, falling four votes short of the necessary 58 votes, the official report was rejected by the Chamber.

The Alianza's report, among other things, discovered that the head of Chiledeportes, Christian Democrat Catalina Depassier, lied about her credentials. In her official curriculum, Depassier stated that she had graduated with a license in philosophy from the University of Chile. In an interview with the press, Monckeberg stated that a phone call with the vice-headmaster of the university revealed that Depassier had never graduated from that institution. "The University explained that [Depassier] only studied Humanities there for a semester in '85. They also told us that in '84, [she] also studied for one semester in the school of Government and Public Service, which she left for academic reasons," Monckeberg said in an interview with El Mercurio.

On January 23, two days after Monckeberg's declarations, Depassier submitted her resignation to President Bachelet, which was approved. In a later press interview, Depassier apologized for the false information about her curriculum. She lashed out against the Alliance, accusing them of waging a "personal" campaign against her. The presidents of the UDI and National Renewal both denied that there was a "personal factor" in the accusations. The UDI president added, "It was she who lied to the country. She should not try to protect herself by blaming those who have made proven accusations against her".

Meanwhile, deputies Soto and González denied the charges that they had used government money to fund their election campaigns, saying the accusations were a "political maneuver by the right". On January 25, they "froze" their membership of the Party for Democracy, supposedly to avoid harming the party.

=== Trials ===
The Public Ministry formally charged Deputy Laura Soto with embezzlement for using state funds of the Programas de Generación de Empleo (PGE, Job Making Programs) to finance her 2005 electoral campaign on March 5, 2007. Soto refused to attend the hearing, and her attorney, Juan Carlos Manríquez, stated that she believed her presence was unnecessary. Manríquez also questioned the legality of subjecting a congressperson to an investigation and trial. He criticized the Public Ministry for not having sufficient evidence and declared the Constitutional Tribunal should decide whether Soto should be investigated. Judge Jorge Abott responded by saying the Public Ministry would continue its investigation. Soto denied critics' assertions that she was "hiding" from the investigation and trying to use her position as deputy to halt them. She also denied any knowledge of the use of PGE money to fund her campaign.

The Public Ministry has announced it is also investigating Soto's daughter, Marisol Paniagua, member of the municipal council of Valparaíso, and José Manuel Mancilla, Regional Secretary of Labor in the Valparaíso Region, for embezzling using the PGE money. Deputy Rodrigo González, facing the same charges, will be charged in April.

Laura Soto has been acquitted of all charges by the tribunal.

== See also ==
- List of political scandals in Chile
- Pinocheques

General:

- Crime in Chile
