= Nicolás Palacios =

Chilean physician, writer and eugenicist

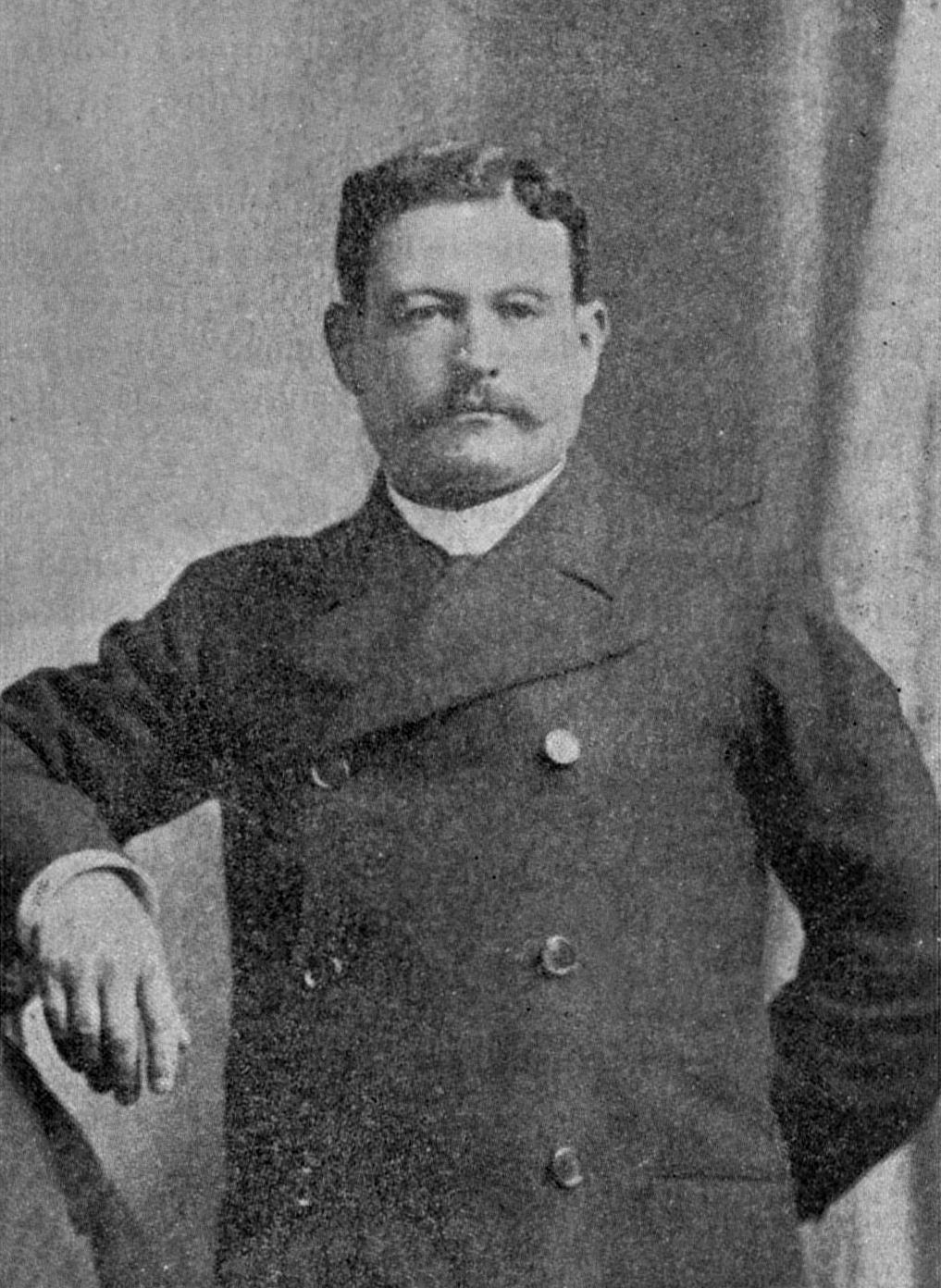
Palacios around 1900

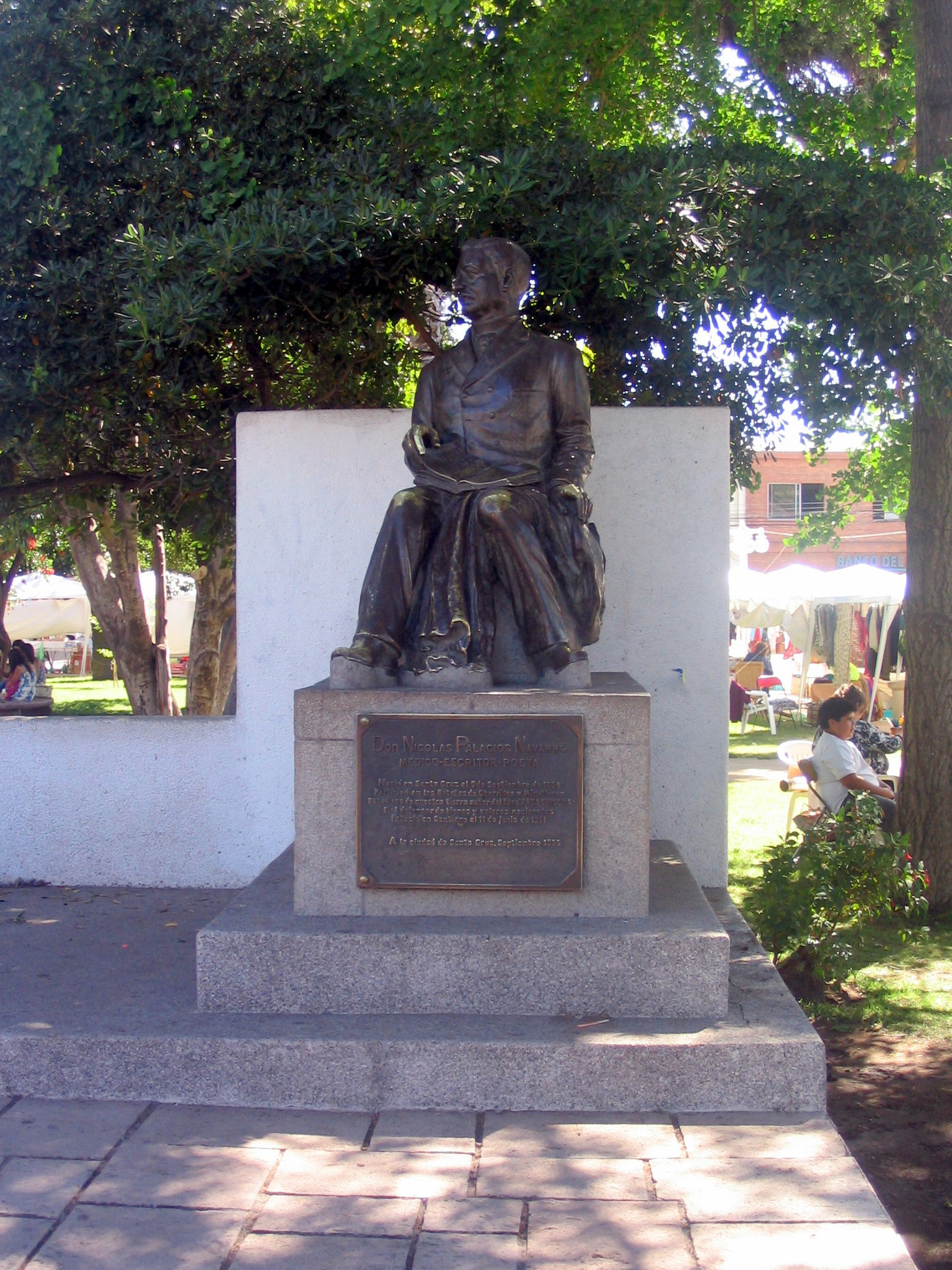
Nicolás Palacios statue on his birthplace's main square, December 2009

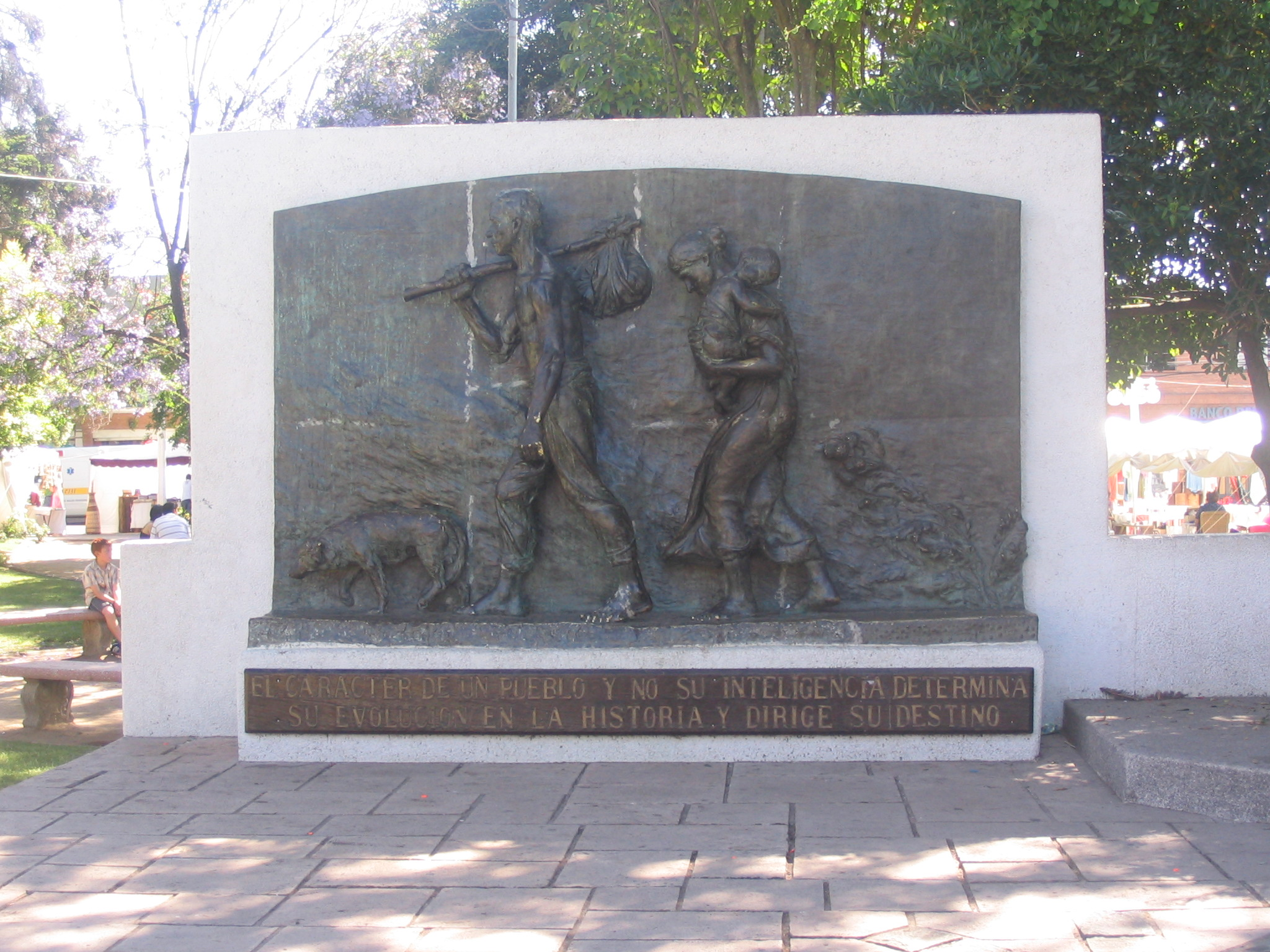
Monument to "Chilean Race", Nicolás Palacios

Nicolás Palacios Navarro (September 9, 1854 – June 11, 1911) was a Chilean physician and writer born in Santa Cruz, best known for his writings on the "Chilean race" and national identity. His 1904 (second edition 1918) book Raza chilena form the ideological backbone of many Chilean nativist groups. Palacios witnessed the Santa María School massacre of 1907 writing a key account of it.

== The Chilean Race ==
Palacios identified what is typically Chilean with the figure of the roto and a supposed Chilean race. He elevated the Chilean mestizo in status since, according to his writings, the Chilean is a mix of two bellicose master races: the Visigoths of Spain and the Mapuche of Chile.

Palacios traced the origins of the Spanish component of the "Chilean race" (Spanish: Raza Chilena) to the coast of the Baltic Sea, specifically to Götaland in Sweden, one of the supposed homelands of the Goths. He said that at most 10% of the Visigoths mixed with the native Iberians of Spain, while the rest remained racially pure through the Middle Ages. The conquest of Chile and the War of Arauco that followed for many years attracted adventurous Spaniards of martial lineage to Chile, thus giving Chile an overwhelming amount of Visigoth heritage and blood, in contrast to other more prosperous Spanish colonies where "merchant peoples" dominated. These Spaniards of supposed Visigoth ancestry would have mingled with native Mapuches, producing the common Chilean roto. According to Palacios, about 25,000 Goths arrived to Chile during the first five generations after its initial conquest in the 1540s and 1550s.

Palacios went on to say that both the blond and the bronze-coloured Chilean mestizo share a "moral physiognomy", and that both think and reason in the same way, a similarity that can be found in early Spanish literature about Chile including the epic poem La Araucana, where Mapuches are frequently compared to the "barbaric" Germanic tribes that fought the Roman Empire. He said that the "Chilean roto" has nothing "Latin" except the language and the surname, rather than being racially a "Latin". Palacios found in alcoholism also a similarity with the Germanic peoples of Northern Europe.

Palacios warned against immigration from Southern Europe and said that on medical grounds, mestizos descended from Southern Europeans lack "cerebral control", and were thus a social burden, given the fact that Southern Europeans have more darker-colored features than Germanic people from Northern Europe who have light-colored hair, eyes, and skin; this is the reason for Chilean government invited immigration and settlement mostly from Northern Europe, particularly German. He added that the Latin race cannot produce a "Miguel Cervantes" or "Michelangelo" in Chile or elsewhere, because the Latin race in the 20th century is very different from that in the Renaissance.
