= Santa Laura =

Santa Laura may refer to:

Buildings

- Estadio Santa Laura (stadium)
- Humberstone and Santa Laura Saltpeter Works (refineries)
- Santa Laura (abbey)

Other

- Saint Laura (Christian martyr)
