= Roberto Silva Renard =

Chilean military and political figure (1855–1920)

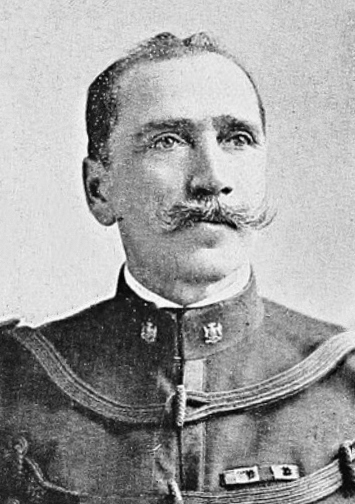
- Renard in 1913
- Born: February 27, 1855; Santiago, Chile
- Died: July 7, 1920 (aged 65); Viña del Mar, Chile

Roberto Silva Renard (February 27, 1855 – July 7, 1920) was a Chilean military and political figure who served in the War of the Pacific and the 1891 Chilean Civil War. He is mostly remembered as the military chief that carried out the Santa María of Iquique School massacre in 1907, where 2,000-3,500 striking saltpeter miners, along with their wives and children, were killed.

== Early career ==
Silva Renard began his military career in 1879, when he joined the artillery corps at the beginning of the War of the Pacific. During that war he fought at the battles of Tacna, Chorrillos and Miraflores

After the war, Silva Renard was sent to study artillery in Europe, and served as an adjunct in the German Army for five years. During the 1891 Chilean Civil War, he was one of the few army officers to join the congressional army, with the rank of major, and fought with distinction at the battles of Concón and Placilla. After the war, he was rewarded with a promotion to lieutenant colonel.

== Political participation ==
Silva Renard was a firm believer in the absolute power of the central government. In 1903, Silva Renard was the military attorney in charge of the investigation into the deaths and injuries of striking workers at the port of Valparaíso. These workers had been fired upon by army soldiers sent to force them back to work. He absolved the soldiers from any misconduct, claiming that the real guilty party had been the workers by promoting disorders.

On September 17, 1904, he was in charge of the troops that put down another (unrelated) strike at the Chile nitrate works. As a consequence of his intervention, 13 workers died and another 32 were injured.

=== Meat riots ===
A march to protest against the high price of meat took place on October 22, 1905, in Santiago. By the time that the march arrived peacefully to La Moneda presidential palace, it had swelled to more than 40,000 people. The original intention of the organizers was to ask for an audience and hand a petition to president German Riesco, but the people started to grow impatient and when the President did not appear (he was not at the palace that day, being sick at home) this was the spark that started the violence. The police tried to disperse them, but they fought back and tried to storm the presidential palace. The police responded by shooting at the crowd, and riots ensued.

After the mob failed in their initial attack, they spread through the city. The violence lasted for almost a week, in what was called the meat riots or the "red week". The rioters looted stores and businesses, killing anyone who looked upper class. The police was overwhelmed and quite powerless (and in some cases, even passively supporting the rioters.) The army was called in, but it was away from the city, on military maneuvers. It only managed to arrive on October 24, under the command of Lt. Colonel Silva Renard, who immediately imposed martial law upon the city. The riots lasted until October 27, and between 200 and 250 people were killed over this period, while more than 500 were injured while the financial losses were staggering.

=== Santa María of Iquique School massacre ===
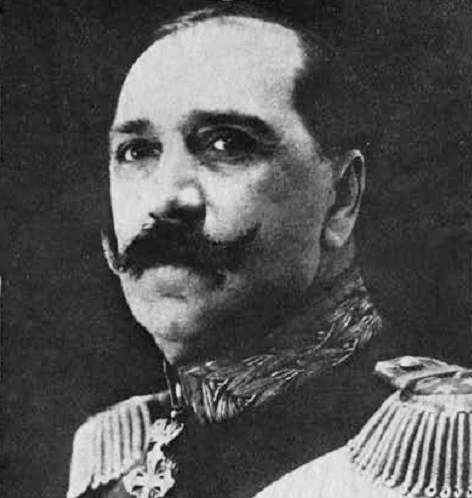

On December 10, 1907, a general strike broke out in Tarapacá Province. This was the start of the 18 Pence Strike (Spanish: La huelga de los 18 peniques), the name referring to the size of the wage being demanded by the nitrate miners. On December 16, thousands of striking workers arrived at the provincial capital, the port city of Iquique, in support of the nitrate miners' demands and with the aim of prodding the authorities to act. Previous entreaties to the government, in particular petitions presented by delegations in 1901, 1903, and 1904, had been fruitless.

The national government in Santiago sent extra regiments by land and sea to reinforce the two regiments stationed in Iquique. President Pedro Montt appointed General Silva Renard to handle the situation. Silva Renard, under confidential orders from the minister of the Interior, Rafael Sotomayor, was ordered to use all necessary means to force the miners to dissolve and return to work.

More and more worker contingents joined the strike by the day. It has been estimated that by December 21 the strikers in Iquique numbered ten to twelve thousand. Soon after the journeys to Iquique began, this great conglomeration of workers met at the Manuel Montt plaza and at the Santa María School, asking the government to mediate between them and the bosses of the foreign (English) nitrate firms to resolve their demands. For their part, the bosses refused to negotiate until the workers went back to work.

The arrival at the port December 19 of the titular intendant, Carlos Eastman Quiroga, of General Silva Renard, chief of the First Military Zone of the Chilean Army, and of Colonel Sinforoso Ledesma was cheered by the workers because a nitrate miners' petition to the government nearly two years earlier, under the previous president, had received an encouraging response, although the demands had not been satisfied. But the interior ministry felt no solidarity with the demands of the strikers. The ministry relayed orders to the strikers to leave the plaza and the school and gather at the horse racing track, where they were to board trains and return to work. They refused, sensing that if they went back to work, their requests would be ignored.

In the face of the growing tension between the groups, on December 20, 1907, the strikers' representatives held a meeting with Intendant Eastman. Simultaneously, a decree published in the press announced the declaration of a state of siege, which entailed the suspension of constitutional rights. While the meeting with Intendant Eastman was taking place in the "Buenaventura nitrate works", a group of workers and their families tried to leave the spot, but troops opened fire on them by the railroad tracks and kept shooting. As a result, six workers died and the rest of the group was wounded.

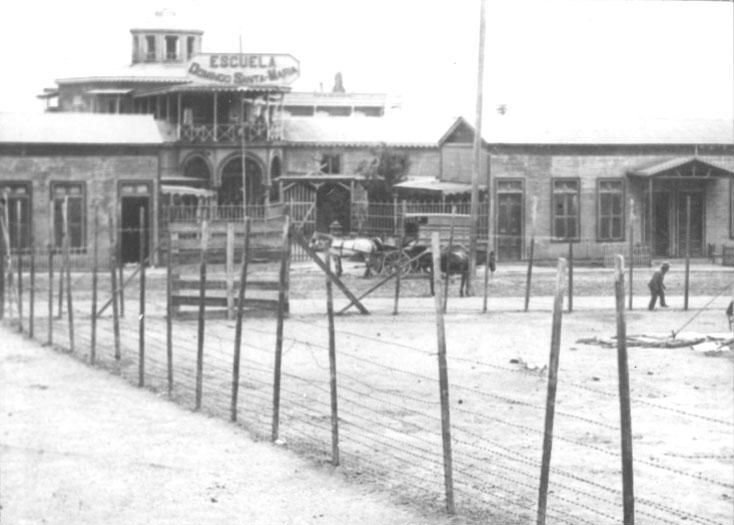
The Santa María school, circa 1907

The funerals of the slain workers were held the next day, December 21, 1907. Immediately at their conclusion, all workers were ordered to leave the school premises and vicinity and relocate to the Club Hípico (horsetrack). The workers refused to go, fearing they might be bombarded by the guns of warships which were lined up alongside the road they would have to travel. At 2:30 in the afternoon, General Silva Renard told the leaders of the workers' committee that if the strikers did not start heading back to work within one hour, the troops would open fire on them. The workers' leaders refused to go, and only a small group of strikers left the plaza.

At the hour indicated by Silva Renard, he ordered the soldiers to shoot the workers' leaders, who were on the school's roof, and they fell dead with the first volley. Elías Lafertte, who witnessed the events, tells:

Between 3.30 and four in the afternoon, there was a terrible expectation inside the Santa María school. The army troops were pointing their guns towards the workers and the roof, where the directive of the movement was gathered in a permanent meeting. As for the machine-guns in the hands of the sailors on the ships at the bay, these were pointed directly against the close ranks of "pampinos". At that time, colonel Roberto Silva Renard arrived, mounted like Napoleón in a white horse, to this unequal battle. A bugler next to him sounded some calls, which caused one of those frightening silences that are so often a prelude to terrible events. The colonel ordered the bugle to call “attention" and gave the order for the crime. He coldly gave the order to fire. The noise of the shots was deafening (…)

The multitude, desperate and trying to escape, surged toward the soldiers, and were fired upon with rifles and machine guns. After a period of firing from the Manuel Montt plaza, the troops stormed the school grounds with machine guns, firing into the school's playgrounds and classrooms, killing in a frenzy without regard to the women and children screaming for mercy. The survivors of the massacre were brought at saber point to the Club Hípico, whence they were sent back to work, where they were subjected to a reign of terror.

== Assassination attempt ==
Among the dead at the Santa María massacre was Manuel Vaca, a Spanish immigrant worker. His half-brother, Antonio Ramón arrived in Chile from Argentina decided to seek revenge. Ramón finally took action seven years later and bought a dagger and some strychnine.

He found Renard walking alone to his office, on December 14, 1914, and stabbed him seven times on his back and head. The General started shouting “Murderer! Murderer!” and several passersby came to his help. Ramón, in turn, stopped the attack and tried to run away, only to be captured by an off-duty prison guard. When Ramón saw himself surrounded and all escapes blocked, he drank the bottle of strychnine he was carrying, but vomited most of it and was unharmed. Once in custody, Ramón vehemently denied other parties' involvement in the assassination, while the worker's organizations held public campaigns to raise money for his defense. He was eventually sentenced to five years in prison.

=== Aftermath ===
Renard survived the attack, but suffered permanent effects from the injuries: he lost all movement on half of his face, became blind, and was mostly an invalid until his death in 1920. Ramón was released in 1919 and all trace of him was lost after his release.

Silva Renard lived his last days in Viña del Mar where he died in 1920. His remains were buried with full honors at the General Cemetery of Santiago. He was honored post-mortem by giving his name to the Artillery Regiment Nº 3 stationed in Concepción. In 2007, his name was removed as part of the 100th anniversary remembrance events of the Santa María School massacres.

== See also ==
- Pedro Montt
- Rafael Sotomayor Gaete
- Meat riots
- Santa María de Iquique Massacre
