= Rafael Sotomayor Gaete =

Chilean politician

Rafael Sotomayor
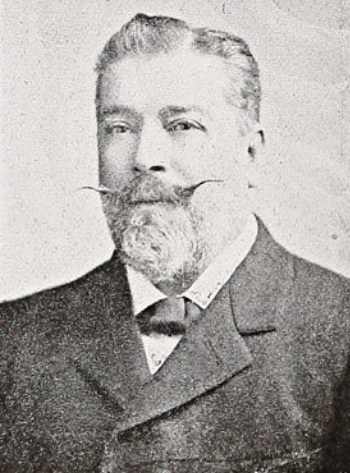
- Gaete in 1913
- Born: November 16, 1848; Cauquenes, Chile
- Died: February 16, 1918 (aged 69); Santiago, Chile

Rafael Segundo Sotomayor Gaete (November 16, 1848 – February 16, 1918) was a Chilean politician and several times minister.

He was born in Cauquenes, the son of Rafael Sotomayor Baeza and Pabla del Carmen Gaete Ruiz. He studied at the Instituto Nacional and later graduated as a lawyer from the Universidad de Chile on January 7, 1871. During the War of the Pacific, he accompanied his father, who was the Minister of War, as personal secretary and auditor, and after his death, in 1880, he became CO of the Customs House Guard in Iquique and later Intendant of Tarapacá. On May 4, 1895, he married Inés Neuhaus Ugarteche, and together they had 6 children.

He joined the Radical Party, and in 1898 President Federico Errázuriz Echaurren appointed him first as Minister of Finance (1898–1899) and later Minister of the Interior (1899). President German Riesco appointed him Minister of the Interior (1903) and then Minister of Foreign Affairs, Cult and Colonization (1903–1904). In 1906 Sotomayor was elected Senator for "Aconcagua" (1906–1912).

President Pedro Montt appointed him Minister of Finance (1906–1907) and then Minister of the Interior (1907–1908). As such he is held responsible of giving the shoot-to-kill order to General Roberto Silva Renard that caused the Santa María School massacre in 1907, where the estimates range between 1,100 and 3,500 men, women and children killed. His reputation never recovered.

Sotomayor died of Spanish flu very early on in the pandemic. He had been on board the ship Infanta Isabel, in front of Pernambuco, at the age of 69, on the return trip from Europe, after having been the Chilean Ambassador to France.

Government offices
Preceded by Raimundo Silva	Minister of the Interior; 1899	Succeeded by Elías Fernández Albano
Preceded by Ramón Barros Luco	Minister of the Interior; 1903	Succeeded by Ricardo Matte Pérez
Preceded by Agustín Edwards Mac Clure	Minister of Foreign Affairs, Cult and Colonization; 1903–1904	Succeeded by Emilio Bello Codesido
Preceded by Manuel Egidio Ballesteros	Minister of the Interior; 1904	Succeeded by Emilio Bello Codesido
Preceded by Luis Antonio Vergara	Minister of the Interior; 1907–1908	Succeeded by Javier Angel Figueroa Larraín
