= 2024 Santiago shooting =

2024 crime in Chile

- Location: Providencia and La Cisterna, Santiago, Chile
- Date: 22 December 2024 c. 18:10 – c. 18:40
- Attack type: Stabbing, mass shooting
- Weapons: Knife, IWI Jericho 941
- Deaths: 3 (1 before the shooting)
- Injuries: 3
- Motive: Under investigation, allegedly religious delusions caused by schizophrenia
- Accused: Carlos Muñoz Vega
- Charges: Simple homicide (2 counts); Attempted simple homicide (3 counts)

On 22 December 2024, Carlos Muñoz Vega allegedly opened fire on random inhabitants of La Cisterna, located in Santiago, Chile, killing 2 people and injuring another 3, one of whom was left paralyzed. The day before, he had stabbed another man to death. He later willingly turned himself into police, claiming have been fulfilling "God's will".

== Attack ==
On 21 December 2024, Carlos Muñoz Vega reportedly stabbed his first victim five times outside of a supermarket in Providencia before fleeing the scene. The next day, he allegedly opened fire with a IWI Jericho 941, a police-issued service pistol, at random citizens in La Cisterna, wounding five more people, two fatally, in three different spots. The entire attack lasted around 30 minutes, starting at around 18:10, after which he turned himself in willingly to a police officer.

=== Victims ===
The initial victim of the attack was revealed to be Andrés Adasme, 38, metal musician and guitarist professionally known as "Hades". The other deceased victims were identified as Bastián Prado, 31, and Carmen Córdova, 46. One of the injured, 44-year-old Jorge Silva, was left paralyzed from the waist down after he was shot at close range. The last one to be injured was Wladimir Mejías, who had previously been stabbed by Muñoz in September 2022.

== Accused ==
Carlos Alfredo Muñoz Vega (born 13 September 1990), nicknamed "Panda", was identified as the alleged perpetrator behind the attacks. Muñoz had a previous criminal record. He had no formal job at the time, and instead worked as a street vendor. According to his family, he suffered from schizophrenia and had been hospitalized multiple times before due to his condition, often suffering from messianic delusions. Allegedly, his mental condition had reportedly worsened when someone close to him had been the victim of sexual assault, at which point he felt "betrayed" and as if he had to do "God's will".

Muñoz was charged with two simple homicides and three attempted simple homicides, as there exists little proof of any premeditation. He is currently incarcerated, where he has been re-diagnosed with schizophrenia.
