= Caso Degollados =

Series of murders in Chile

The Caso Degollados ('Slit-Throat Case') was a politically motivated series of murders of opposition members that took place in Chile in 1985, during Augusto Pinochet's military dictatorship. The murders caused a huge political scandal.

== Events of the case ==
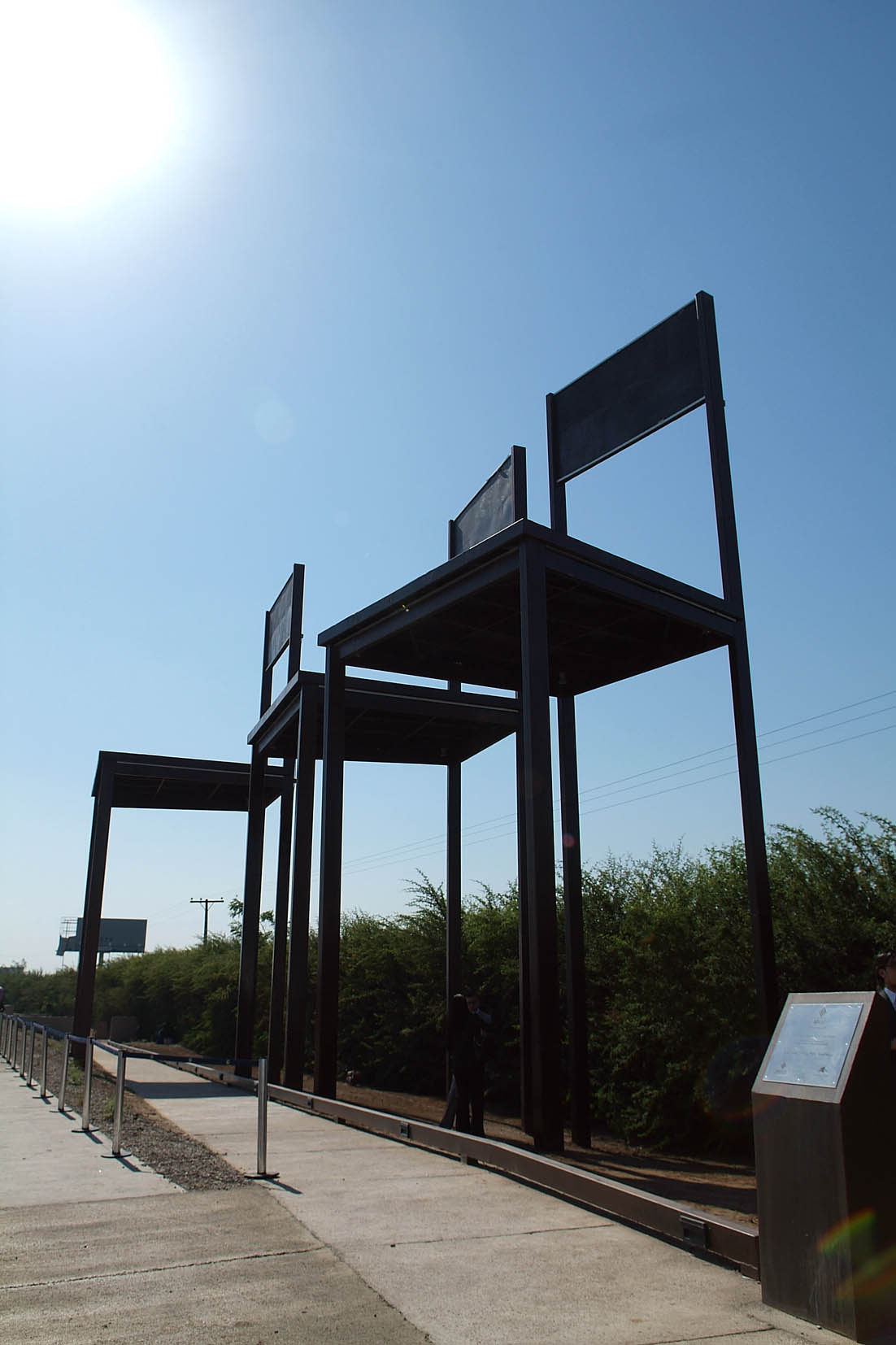
Monument inaugurated in 2006 commemorating the victims

On March 30, 1985, three Communist Party members were savagely murdered. The bodies of Santiago Nattino, Manuel Guerrero Ceballos and José Manuel Parada were discovered near Santiago's airport, their throats slashed. Nattino, a painter and supporter of the AGECH teachers' union, had been kidnapped on March 28, while AGECH leader Guerrero, and Parada, a Vicaría de la Solidaridad staff member, were abducted on March 29.

The brutal triple murder, which came to be known as Caso Degollados, evoked widespread indignation and compelled the Supreme Court to appoint Judge José Cánovas Robles as special prosecutor to investigate the crime.

Only four months later, the investigation carried out by Judge Cánovas led to the arrest of two colonels, one major, two captains and two non-commissioned officers of the national police force (carabineros). The aftermath of this case provoked, on August 2, 1985, the resignation of General César Mendoza, Director General of the Carabineros and Member of Government Junta since the military coup of September 11, 1973, as well as the dissolution of DICOMCAR, an agency of the Carabineros that had allegedly carried out the kidnappings and assassinations. In its 1985 special report, the Inter-American Commission on Human Rights stated that it hoped that “the case now under way will lead to the identification and punishment of the persons responsible for the execution of so culpable an act.”

Eventually six members of the police secret service were indicted and sentenced to life for the murders.

== See also ==
- Chilean political scandals
- Chile under Pinochet
- Human rights violations in Pinochet's Chile
