= Luis Advis =

Luis Advis Vitaglich (10 February 1935 – 9 September 2004) was a Chilean professor of philosophy, and a noted composer of traditional and New Chilean music. He was officially recognized as a fundamental figures of Chilean music in 2003.

== Biography ==
Advis was born in Iquique in northern Chile. He graduated in Philosophy from the Universidad de Chile and held numerous academic posts in various schools of higher learning in his country.

== Musical work ==
Advis did not formally study music or composition at university, but he studied piano with Alberto Spikin and composition with Chilean academic and musician Gustavo Becerra-Schmidt (to whom the amalgamation of the European classical music traditions with Latin American musical expressions is owed). Although Advis recognized his appreciation of traditional classical music, he felt the need to revitalize and develop popular and folk music through works such as cantatas and symphonies.

Prominent in his repertoire for vocalists are the cantata Santa María de Iquique (a milestone of the New Chilean Song movement), the Canto para una Semilla (Song for a Seed) based on poems by Violeta Parra (recorded by Inti-illimani, Isabel Parra and Carmen Bunster), and a symphony, Los Tres Tiempos de América, which was premiered and recorded in 1988 by Quilapayún with the Spanish singer Paloma San Basilio and an orchestra of Spanish musicians. In 1979 he published the book Displacer y Transendencia en el Arte (Displeasure and transcendence in Art).

Among his last projects was an arrangement for Del Salón al Cabaret la Belle Epoque Chilena (From the Saloon to the Cabaret the Chilean Belle Epoque) - this was a theatrical, musical and choreographic recreation of styles of that era, which involved 70 musicians and actors from the Escuela de Teatro de la Pontificia Universidad Católica(Theatrical School of the Pontifical Catholic University of Chile); it was recorded in 2002. He composed Cinco danzas breves (Five brief dances) (cha-cha-chá, Cuban son, waltz, habanera and rag-time) for the Saxophonic Quartet Villafruela, which were released in the Saxofonos de Latinoamérica (Saxophones of Latin America) CD. In his final days he completed an oratorio titled La Pampa del Tamarugal, which has not yet premiered.

Advis recognized the importance of popular-folk music when he began to listen to Violeta Parra. Advis – like Sergio Ortega - provided the sound of Chile, a sound conveyed by the fundamental works of the Nueva canción Chilena: Santa María de Iquique and Canto para una Semilla. Other compositions include the orchestral Suite Latinoamericana, a wind quintet, music for theatre, cinema and television, in a musical catalogue that comprises more than 150 works that covers all spheres and goes from the classical to the popular-folk. Advis was a fundamental figure in Latin American art for his music.

== Compositions ==
- Sexteto (para cuerdas y clarinete) (1957)
- La princesa Panchita (1958)
- Cinco preludios (1960)
- Quinteto de vientos (1962)
- Cosas (para piano y canto) (1963)
- Divertimiento (para piano y quinteto de vientos)(1964)
- Tres preludios(para piano y canto) (1964)
- Las travesura de don Dionisio (1964)
- Los grillos sordos (1964)
- Santa María de Iquique (cantata popular) (1969)
- Sal del desierto (1972)
- Canto para una semilla (1972)
- La tierra prometida (1973)
- Suite latinoamericana (para seis instrumentos) (1976)
- Rin y cueca (para piano y soprano) (1976)
- Julio comienza en julio (música de la película) (1978)
- Sobre un tema alemán (1983)
- Sonatina (para fagot y piano) (1983)
- Suite sobre un tema de Ch. Joplin (1983)
- Los tres tiempos de América (Sinfonía) (1987)
- Murales extremeños (cantata) (1993)
- Preludio (para piano) (1996)
- Invitación al vals (para cuatro flautas y un corno)(1996)
- Viña del Mar (canción para soprano y piano) (1997)
- Cinco danzas breves (para cuarteto de saxofones) (1998)
- Coronación (2000)
- La Pampa del Tamarugal (oratorio) (2004)
