= Edmundo Pérez Zujovic =

Chilean politician (1912–1971)

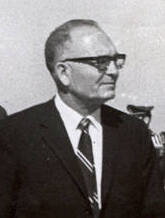
- Pérez Zujovic in 1967

Minister of the Interior
- In office 5 February 1968 – 9 July 1969
- President: Eduardo Frei Montalva
- Preceded by: Bernardo Leighton
- Succeeded by: Patricio Rojas

Minister of Public Works
- In office 16 December 1965 – 7 September 1967
- President: Eduardo Frei Montalva
- Preceded by: Modesto Collados
- Succeeded by: Sergio Ossa

Personal details
- Born: 7 May 1912 Antofagasta, Chile
- Died: 8 June 1971 (aged 59) Santiago, Chile
- Party: Christian Democratic Party
- Spouse: Lidia Yoma
- Children: 9
- Parent(s): Servando Pérez; Ángela Zujovic
- Education: Colegio San Luis
- Occupation: Politician

Edmundo Pérez Zujovic (May 11, 1912 – June 8, 1971) was a Chilean businessman and politician, militant of the Christian Democratic Party (PDC). He served as Minister of State during the government of president Eduardo Frei Montalva, in the administration he led the Public Works and Interior portfolios.

In 1969 he was accused by the left-wing opposition of being the main person responsible for the Puerto Montt massacre – the death of eleven residents at the hands of Carabineros de Chile during an eviction procedure for an illegal land occupation. On June 8, 1971, during the government of socialist president Salvador Allende, he was assassinated by the far-left armed group Vanguardia Organizada del Pueblo (VOP) in retaliation for that massacre.

== Early years ==
Edmundo Pérez Zujovic was born in the Chilean city of Antofagasta on May 11, 1912, son of Servando Pérez and Ángela Zujovic. He completed his secondary studies at the San Luis school in that city. At the age of eighteen, when his father died suddenly, he had to take care of his family: three younger brothers, his mother and the oldest of his brothers who was studying at the university in Santiago. For this reason he did not pursue higher education. Despite this, he managed to forge himself as an entrepreneur, particularly in the construction area in the north of his country.

He participated in companies that developed the economic housing business, as well as others linked to the production of plaster and parquet. He was also started fishing activities in the port of Iquique with the creation of the Guanaye company. He married Lydia Yoma, also from Antofagasta in 1938, with whom he had nine children: five daughters and four sons. His wife could never recover from her death and she died a few years later. His son Edmundo, also a Christian Democrat militant, would come to occupy in 2008 —during the first government of President Michelle Bachelet— the position of Interior Minister.

As a founding member of the Falangist tent, Frei Montalva, his comrade, once in power, called him to serve as Minister of Public Works, first, and as Minister of the Interior, later. In the PDC he held the positions of communal president, national councilor and national vice president of the party.

== Bloodshed in Puerto Montt ==
On March 9, 1969, a group of Chilean police attempted to remove a group of squatters at Puerto Montt, killing ten of them, in what has come to be called the Massacre of Puerto Montt. As Minister of the Interior, Pérez had been consulted about what to do with the squatter camp. While no one knows if he ordered police to shoot, he did approve the removal of settlers from the illegal settlement, reversing his government's previous policy of squatter appeasement. It appears that he took this action because an opposition politician from the region, a leader of multiple squatter land-grabs, had recently been elected, thereby politicizing settlements in that area. Police had two encounters with settlers on that day. In the first one the police tear-gassed and stormed the camp, apparently without warning, after having given assurances to the contrary the previous day. The settlers subsequently returned in larger numbers and overwhelmed the police using crude weapons. The police then fired on the group.

Outrage was enormous, even within the ruling Christian Democratic party. The leftist opposition blamed Pérez Zujovic and Jorge Pérez Sánchez for the death of the squatters, but they were not brought to trial.

Chilean folk singer Víctor Jara wrote a song about the massacre entitled "Preguntas por Puerto Montt" ("Questions for Puerto Montt"), which mentions Perez Zujovic by name:

Usted debe responder	You have to answer
señor Pérez Zujovic	Mr Pérez Zujovic
porqué al pueblo indefenso,	why was the defenseless people
contestaron con fusil.	answered with guns.
Señor Pérez su conciencia	Mr Pérez, your conscience --
la enterró en un ataúd	you buried it in a coffin
y no limpiarán sus manos	and all the rains of the South
toda la lluvia del sur.	will not clean your hands.

On one occasion, Jara sang the song at Saint George's College in Santiago. Part of the audience responded violently, throwing stones at the artists who had to be rescued by a group of students and teachers. Only after leaving the stage did Jara discover that Pérez Zujovic's younger son (a former student of the college) was present and had instigated the violence.

== Assassination ==
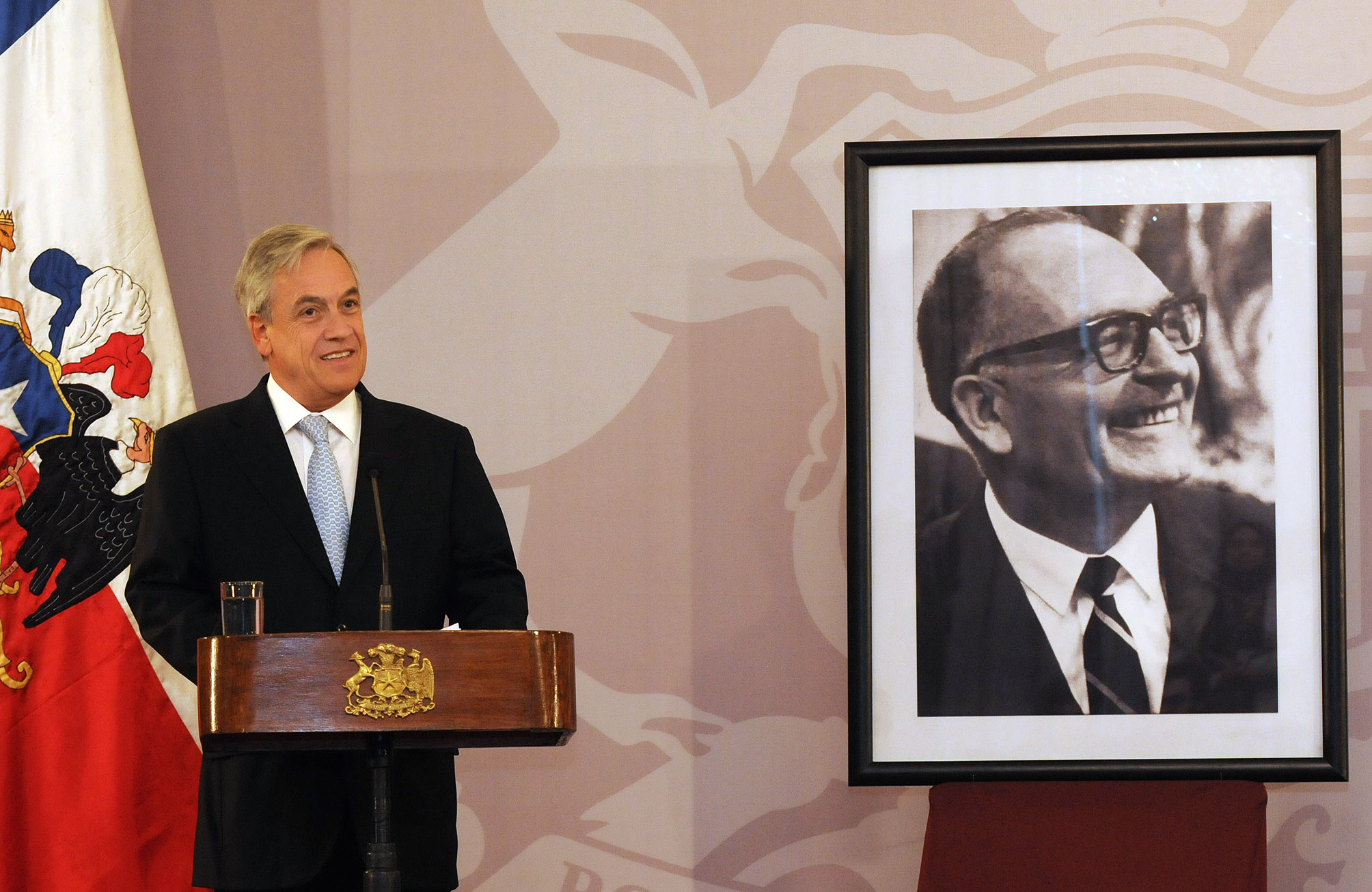
Homage to Pérez in 2011

On June 8, 1971, Pérez was driving to his construction firm office in his Mercedes-Benz, accompanied by his daughter, Maria Angélica, when his car was rammed by three men in another vehicle. Having brought Pérez’s car to a halt, one of the men smashed the window of the Mercedes and killed Pérez with a burst of submachine-gun fire. Maria Angelica later identified the gunman as Ronald Rivera Calderon, a member of a leftist terrorist group called Organized Vanguard of the People. On June 13, Ronald Rivera Calderon was killed by police in a gunfight at his hideout; his brother, Arturo, committed suicide, and seven others were arrested.

Pérez’s assassination is thought to have exacerbated the deepening divide in Chilean politics which would eventually lead to the 1973 coup d'état.

== Family ==
Pérez was married to Lidia Yoma. They had nine children: five daughters and four sons, including politician Edmundo Pérez Yoma.
