= Campamento (Chile) =

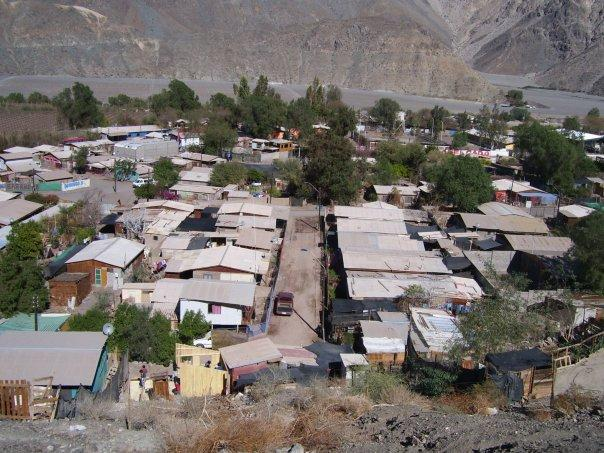
A campamento in Chile

In Chile, the term campamento (camp or tent city) is used to refer to shanty towns that emerged rapidly between the 1960s and 1980s. Synonymous terms for campamentos include "villas miserias" (misery slums), "colonias populares" (popular colonies), and "barrios marginales" (marginal neighborhoods).

== Definition ==
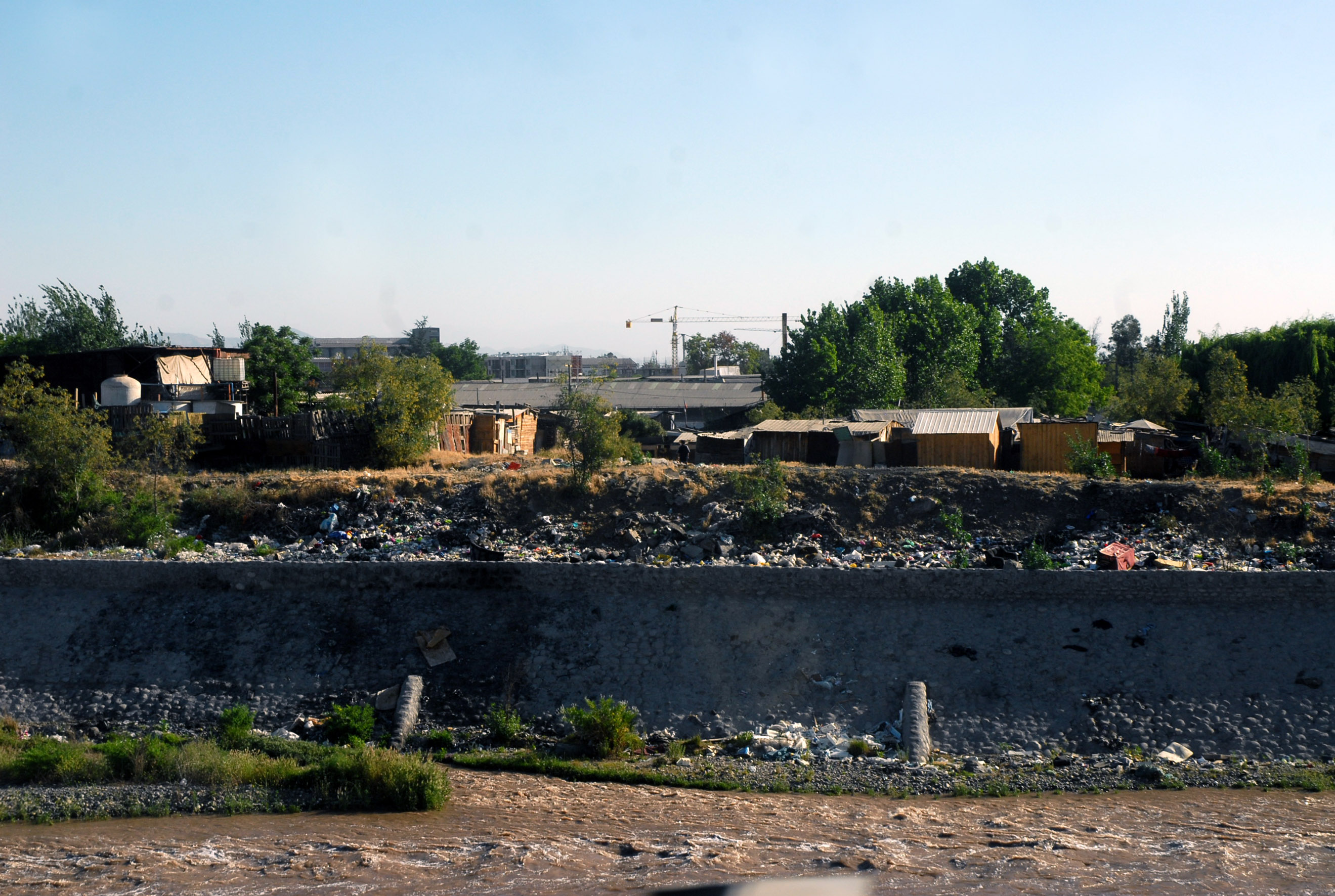
A campamento in the outskirts of Santiago

The non-governmental organization Un Techo para Chile defines a campamento as a group of basic and rudimentary dwellings that house at least eight families. These settlements lack at least one essential service, such as drinking water, electricity, or wastewater treatment, and are illegally occupying the land. According to studies from Un Techo para Chile, 76% of homes of campamento status in Chile lack access to potable water, 91% lack plumbing, and 48% lack formal access to electricity.

== Causes ==
Campamentos often result from the influx of primarily rural workers who migrate to work for city industries. When these low-wage workers find that they cannot pay the high rents of city dwellings, this leads to an accumulation of casual housing, or shantytowns. Residents of campamentos are often temporary workers or laborers working for informal industries, frequently earning wages that are only 60% of the legal minimum wage. Enzo Faletto (1964) explains that workers may come to campamentos with the intention of someday integrating in the city, but due to the poor quality and duration of their employment, they are left with further economic insecurity.

== Population ==
In 2004, there were 531 campamentos in Chile, with 27,785 houses accommodating 32,371 families. An estimated 75% of this population lived below the national poverty line, and 41% were in extreme poverty. By 2011, the number of campamentos had risen to 657, housing 27,378 families. In 2018, there were 822 campamentos, home to 46,423 families. Between 2010 and 2020, the total number of campamentos increased by 22%, and as of 2023, there is currently 113,000 families living in 1,300 campamentos, indicating an increase of 142.06% between 2019 and 2023. This corresponds to campamentos accounting for 2% of all Chilean homes based on the 2017 census. The highest growth was seen in cities such as Antofagasta, Calama, Copiapó, Iquique-Alto Hospicio, La Serena, Valparaíso, and Viña del Mar.

== Antofagasta, Chile ==
Chile is the world's largest copper suppliers and one of the world's largest lithium suppliers, making mining an essential industry for the national economy. Most of Chile's mining occurs in the Atacama Desert, and Antofagasta is viewed as Chile's economic hub due to its four international ports dedicated almost entirely to transporting minerals. Many Chileans and immigrants move to Antofagasta to work the mines, and this increase in demand causes rent prices in the city to rise and thus an accumulation of campamentos in the city's outskirts. Although these mining industries offer seemingly high wages, they are not substantial enough to sustain city living for these subcontracted workers. According to the Catastro Nacional de Campamentos report from the non-profit TECHO-Chile, the number of campamentos in Chile has risen 51.7% from the period between 2020-2021 and 2022-2023. This report explains that 91.9% of families living in campamentos cite high lease costs as a relevant reason for living there, while 79.3% of families cite low salaries as a relevant reason.

== Environmental justice ==
The augment of campamentos in Chile can be seen as an environmental justice issue. In recent decades, the economy of Chile has been expanding due to the expansion of mineral extraction within its borders. However, the benefits of this economic growth is not being distributed to the country at large, as demonstrated by the social exclusion of citizens of a certain class from Chilean cities. Those who have no choice but to reside in campamentos are often the most vulnerable citizens in Chilean society, for reasons such as losing one's job, or economic/familial instability. In addition, immigrants make up a disproportionate percentage of campamento residents.

It is often difficult for those already living in campamentos to find the means necessary to leave and pay for formal housing due to how most campamento residents can only obtain informal or temporary jobs. Furthermore, the liberal economy of Chile offers minimal to no state protections, thus causing further economic insecurity for campamento families. Given the precarious living conditions that characterize these shantytowns, and the pollution that often accompanies informal housing due to close proximity to industrial industries, the rise of campamentos can be considered environmentally unjust.

== See also ==
- Squatting in Chile
- Sacrifice zones
