= Marusia massacre =

1925 mass killing of workers in Chile

Date	March 1925
Location	Huara, Chile
Result	Strike of the mine workers repressed, Chilean government victory

Belligerents
Government of Chile: Chilean Army	Chilean mine workers

Commanders and leaders
Arturo Alessandri; Pedro Schultz	Militant mine workers

Casualties and losses
	500 mine workers

The Marusia massacre (Spanish: Masacre de Marusia) (March, 1925) was the response of the Chilean government under president Arturo Alessandri to a strike by the workers of a saltpeter mine leading to over 500 dead, over ninety percent being strikers or their family members.

== Background ==
The nitrate oficina (saltpeter mine) of Marusia was located in the foothills of the Andes in the región de Tarapacá, about 4 1/2 miles northwest of the town of Huara. Its monthly production was 865 tons of salt. In March 1925, the mine workers went on strike to demand higher pay, a shorter workday, and better working conditions. While negotiations were taking place between the company executives and the workers' representatives, the British engineer who ran the mine, a man much hated because of his habit of whipping his workers, was found dead near the mine. A Bolivian engineer was accused of the crime and executed without due process by decision of the company owners.

== Events ==
The union, under the leadership of Domingo Soto (labor leader), was afraid of reprisals, especially another massacre like the one that had happened only a few years before in San Gregorio, so they decided to take several preventive measures. They contacted the other mines and proposed blowing up the railroad tracks to prevent the arrival of strikebreakers. Upon being apprised of the unrest, the government responded by sending forty soldiers under the command of Captain Gilberto Troncoso, known as the "Hyena of San Gregorio" for his violent behavior.

The women of Marusia organized themselves under the leadership of Selva Saavedra and decided to resist the advance of the troops. When the soldiers arrived, they entered the town shooting. A group of workers responded by throwing dynamite sticks at the soldiers, killing several of them and seizing their guns. Then the workers mounted a counteroffensive, taking over the explosives depot of the mine and cutting the telegraphic wires. Captain Troncoso was forced to retreat.

The miners proceeded to arm the whole town (about 2,400 people). In an open assembly, the union leaders proposed negotiating their surrender, while some miners advocated calling upon the help of the workers from other mines. In the end, a motion by Soto that the town priest be asked to mediate was adopted.

The army reinforcements arrived in the form of a 300-man battalion under the command of Colonel Pedro Schultz. They attacked the town in the middle of the night and machine-gunned everyone in sight. Hundreds died, including women and children — the exact number was never properly established. A group of workers was able to mount a hasty defense, throwing dynamite sticks at the advancing troops, and they managed to kill 36 soldiers and injure 64. The surviving miners escaped with their families into the high mountains. This put an end to the immediate strike, but the conflict flared again less than two months later, leading to the La Coruña massacre.

== Popular culture ==
The film titled Letters from Marusia is based on the Patricio Manns novel (1974) inspired by these events.

== See also ==
- Arturo Alessandri
- San Gregorio massacre
- La Coruña massacre
- History of Chile
- List of massacres in Chile
- Santa María School massacre
