= Hernán Gómez =

Hernán Gómez or Hernangómez is a Spanish name and a surname. It may refer to:

- Hernán Darío Gómez (born 1956), Colombian footballer
- Pablo Hernán Gómez (1977–2001), Argentine footballer
- Juancho Hernangómez (born 1995), Spanish basketball player
- Willy Hernangómez (born 1994), Spanish basketball player
