= Massacre of Puerto Montt =

1969 massacre by Chilean police

- Location: Llanquihue Province, Chile
- Date: 9 March 1969; 57 years ago
- Attack type: Massacre
- Weapons: Carbines, tear gas
- Deaths: 10
- Injuries: 73 (50 civilians and 23 police)
- Perpetrator: Carabineros de Chile

The massacre of Puerto Montt (also known as the slaughter of Pampa Irigoin) occurred on March 9, 1969, in Llanquihue, Chile. It took place under the Christian Democrat government of Eduardo Frei Montalva. During the massacre, ten inhabitants of the province died at the hands of Chilean police officers (including a nine-month-old baby who died from inhaling tear gas) and another seventy people (between carabineros and occupants) were wounded to varying degrees. The political responsibilities for what happened have long been the subject of controversy in Chile, with much of the blame being placed on then Minister of the Interior Edmundo Pérez Zujovic, who would be assassinated in revenge two years later by the far-left urban guerrilla organization Vanguardia Organizada del Pueblo (VOP).

== The events ==
In March 1969, 90 poor families squatted land at Pampa Irigoin, near to Puerto Montt.

Supported by socialist Luis Espinoza, local authority and recently elected congressman, they intended to obtain a legal expropriation for non-use of the land (possible in Chilean legislation of that time) and be able to build their future homes there. In the context of incipient land reform and the proliferation of campamentos (shantytowns) throughout the country due to the lack of housing to sustain the growing rates of rural-urban migration, these actions were not uncommon in the Chile of the time.

The seizing of land took place in a calm and peaceful manner, and there was no immediate action on the part of the Carabineros. The negotiations proceeded normally for four days, with no sign from the government that an eviction would take place. However, on the fifth day of occupation, and once the police contingent had received reinforcements from other prefectures, the police initiated the eviction. The eviction was carried out at dawn, hoping to find the occupants sleeping, thus resulting in no resistance. However, the improvised alarm systems (cans tied with wire at low heights) that the occupants had installed, allowed for them to react, armed with sticks and stones. The police responded by using carbines and tear gas, causing the death of 10 villagers and leaving about 50 residents injured; 23 Carabineros were injured.

The police operation involved 200 police officers led by Colonel Alberto Apablaza and Major Rolando Rodríguez who, in turn, carried out orders from Interior Minister Edmundo Pérez Zujovic and the acting district intendente Jorge Pérez Sánchez.

The motivation for this event have been discussed in great detail; and range from a legitimate housing problem all the way to political interests.

== Reactions and cultural expressions ==
The Communist Party, the Socialist Party and the other parties of the Popular Unity made the Minister of the Interior responsible for the incident.

On June 8, 1971, under the government of the socialist president Salvador Allende, a cell of the Organized Vanguard of the People (VOP) assassinated Edmundo Pérez Zujovic, justifying his actions as revenge for the massacre in Puerto Montt. The investigators located the armed commando and killed three of them: the brothers Ronald and Arturo Rivera Caderón and Heriberto Salazar Bello.

Conceptual artist Luis Camnitzer exhibited on June 20, 1969, an installation titled Massacre of Puerto Montt. The exhibition was reportedly a failure: as Camnitzer pointed out in a 2013 interview, "the left attacked me because there was no blood and the right because there were words. I did a similar work in Caracas, very popular, but in Chile they passed through the room, saw nothing and left." This work was later acquired by the Reina Sofía National Art Center Museum, where it's currently on display.

The singer-songwriter Victor Jara composed a song about the events, called Preguntas por Puerto Montt.

In 2010, Paulo Vargas Almonacid shot the documentary Ni todas la lluvia del sur, about the events.
