= Forrahue massacre =

Killing of 15 Mapuche-Huilliche farmers in Chile by Chilean police in 1912

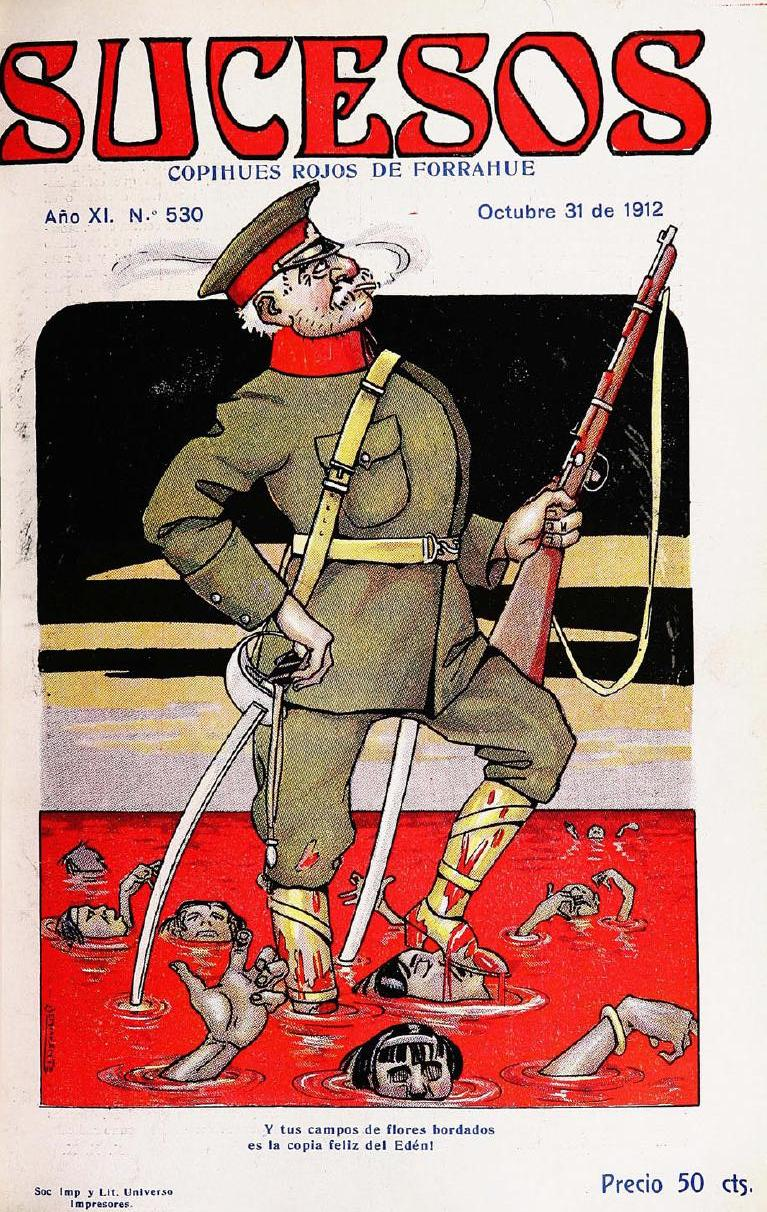
1912 cover of Sucesos magazine alluding to the massacre.

The Forrahue massacre (Spanish: Matanza de Forrahue) was the killing of 15 Mapuche-Huilliche farmers in Forrahue, southern Chile by Chilean police in 1912. The massacre occurred as police moved to oust Mapuche-Huilliche farmers from lands claimed by Atanasio Burgos Villalobos. The farmers had previously lost a lawsuit and had armed themselves, according to the police, with sticks, boiling water and a few rifles to attempt to resist eviction. The killings took place on October 21 when police returned after a failed eviction attempt in October 14. Local family history tell that a ruka was burned with people inside, yet this is lacking from the reports of contemporary newspapers. Events became known outside Forrahue when the bodies of the dead arrived in carts to the nearby city of Osorno. News of the event caused outrage as far as in Santiago, the capital of Chile. The National Congress of Chile requested a report on the massacre, which was later written by police officer Julio Farías.

Violence in the area continued as on March 5, 1914, Onofre Burgos, the brother of Atanasio, was killed. In the incident Onofre and his servant Estanislao González had come by horse to evict Manuel Nilian from his property but encountered only women in the house. Onofre threatened the women and shot the house's dog dead. Hiden behind a wall Manuel shot Onofre from a small aperture, forcing González to retreat with Onofre who was dying. Manuel fled to Osorno avoiding the main roads and surrendered to police there. He spent months in jail before being set free.

== See also ==
- Social unrest in Neltume
- Ranquil massacre
