= Ranquil massacre =

Date	June–July 1934
Location	Alto Bío Bío, Chile
Result	Demands of the workers rejected, repressing peasant land seizures and strike repressed, Chilean government victory

Belligerents
Government of Chile: Chilean Army; Carabineros de Chile; Mapuche allies	Chilean forestry workers and peasants Mapuche rebels

Commanders and leaders
Arturo Alessandri; Óscar Novoa; Humberto Arriagada Valdivieso; Lonko allies	Militant workers Lonkos; Peasants

Political support
Liberals; Conservatives	Socialists; Communists

Casualties and losses
6 soldiers	477 workers and Mapuches

The Ranquil massacre (Spanish: matanza de Ránquil) was a massacre of forestry workers by the Chilean Army in the upper Bio-Bio River in 1934. The upper Bio-Bio region had recently been opened for Chilean and foreign settlers due to the occupation of the Araucania, and huge extensions of former Mapuche land were available. The workers rebelled against the lumber mill administrators, later the Chilean Army was called to restore order. 477 workers, many of them Mapuches, were killed as result. Around 500 prisoners were taken.

== Origin ==
The origins of the rebellion are manifold. On the one hand, the massive Colonization plan promoted between 1881 and 1914 by the Chilean Government, with the consequent installation of 15,000 foreign settlers (Germans, French, Swiss, Austrians, etc.) resulted in the decrease of the heritage of the peoples Mapuche, who, pressured by the continuous state alienation of land, ended up as impoverished farmers in the Lonquimay sector. Another thesis proposes the conditions of semi-slavery that affected peasants and workers in the Lonquimay sector. This situation was somewhat similar to that of nitrate plants in northern Chile, where workers were strongly subject to the authority of their employer. Even the payment for their services consisted not of money but of tokens, which could only be exchanged at the employer-owned grocery stores.

In addition, since the end of the 19th century, serious disputes had been generated between the Mapuche communities (ancestral owners of the area), a product of the exile that ended up benefiting foreign settlers. Finally, the decision of the company Sociedad Puelma Tupper to evict the "occupiers" or "usurpers" of the lands that the Government had ceded to it, caused a break between the indigenous communities and the State. Despite some agreements between the parties, Carabineros de Chile forces began to harass the former residents.

== Uprising and repression ==
The uprising of the Mapuche peasants was rather the effect of the one set off by workers from the Lonquimay gold washings. These rose up against the administration of the grocery store, for abusive treatment, proceeding to assault and set fire to the premises. Faced with this situation, the government of President Arturo Alessandri Palma sent a unit of Carabineros and military forces to the area, which began to attack the insurgents, which, far from dissolving the revolt, caused the fusion of workers and peasants from the Mapuche communities in a single front.

The mutineers were deployed in the surroundings, armed with shotguns and other defensive means of different kinds, and marched on Temuco. The government - greatly alarmed by the history of the recently stifled Socialist Republic - sent a whole regiment of policemen and mapuche allies. The battle took place near the Fundo Ránquil, where the insurgents were surrounded by Carabineros on July 6, 1934. According to some sources, the effective number of deaths is estimated at 500, given that at that time the indigenous peoples were not registered in official books of the Civil Registry, so the count of victims was not rigorous (the official version of 1934 places them between just 150 and 200). According to other information provided by Olga Ulianova, a Chilean nationalized Russian historian, according to Comintern documents, the Communist Party had a direct participation in the revolt. This participation consisted in the formation of "revolutionary camps", in the style of the Soviets. The participation of the Communist Party in this revolt, meant, at that time, its first approach to the indigenous problem, calling for the return of lands and the establishment of an Araucanian Republic.

== See also ==
- Social unrest in Neltume (1945–1981)
- List of massacres in Chile
- Patagonia Rebelde

== Sources ==
- Levantamiento campesino en Ranquil, Lonquimay
