= Pinocheques =

Cheques paid out to Augusto Pinochey Jr

Pinocheques were three cheques of total US$3,000,000 paid in mid-1989 by the Chilean army to Augusto Pinochet, Jr., the son of former dictator General Augusto Pinochet for the purchase of bankrupt "Valmoval", a small rifle company in 1987.

Pinochet's son was not under the rifle company's owner and no reason could be found for the payment.

The payment was investigated 1990 by a parliamentary investigative committee chaired by Jorge Schaulson.

On 19 December 1990, General Pinochet, still commander-in-chief of the army, stormed into the army headquarters and placed the 57,000 member force in alert, in what the general called a "ejercicio de enlace" (Spanish for Link exercise) and asked for an end to the investigation. Similar pressure was applied in May 1993 again with boinazo (Spanish for Putsch with the beret).

The Chilean justice system continued to investigate the payment, but in 1994 as the Chilean Supreme court had to make a decision, the President of Chile Eduardo Frei Ruiz-Tagle asked them to stop the case for reasons of state.

The disclosure of the Riggs Bank accounts reignited in 2005 the case against Pinochet in Chile. Judge Manuel Valderrama investigated whether the three purchase checks for Valmoval wound up in Pinochet's secret accounts, but in 2010 the suit was discontinued without results.

The armed forces' ejercicio de enlace-standoff was the worst crisis of the (then) 3-year-old coalition government of President Patricio Aylwin.

== See also ==
- Military of Chile
