= Miracle of Chile =

Term coined by Milton Friedman

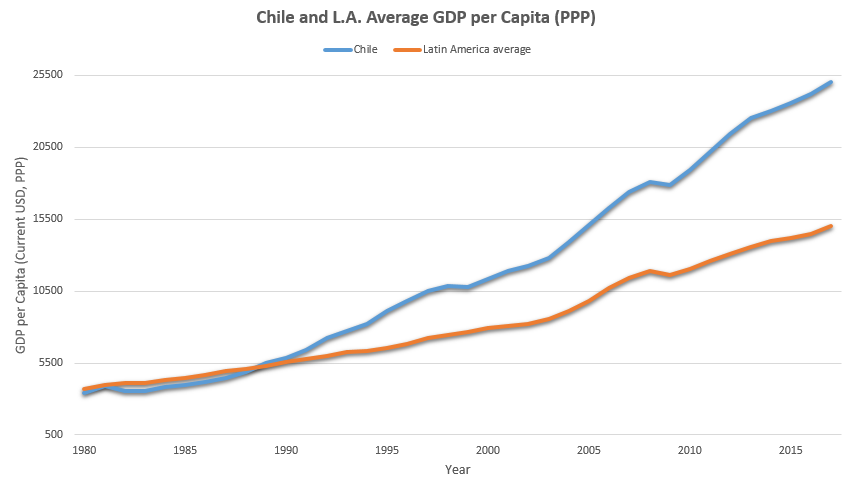
Chilean (blue) and average Latin American (orange) GDP per capita (1980–2017)

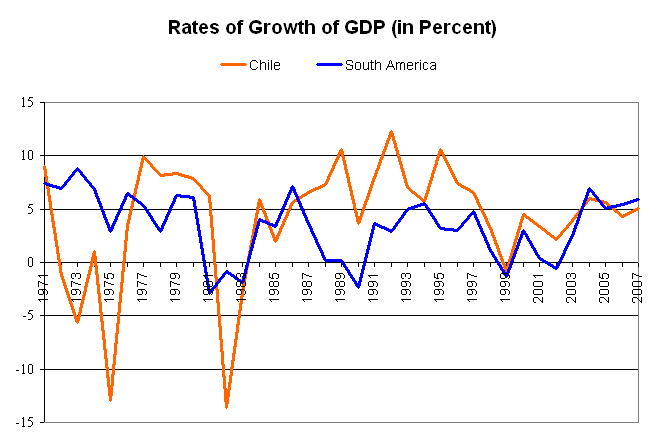
Chilean (orange) and average South American (blue): Rates of Growth of GDP (1971–2007)

The "Miracle of Chile" was a term proclaimed by economist Milton Friedman in 1982 to describe the effects of the neoliberal economic policies of the Pinochet dictatorship, which were guided by a group of economists who collectively came to be known as the Chicago Boys, having studied at the University of Chicago where Friedman taught.

Immediately after Friedman's praise for Chile's economic reforms, Chile experienced a financial crisis which resulted in a recession. Following the crises, the Pinochet dictatorship walked back on some neoliberal policies, most notably the reversal of bank deregulation.

== Overview ==
The economic reforms implemented by the Chicago Boys had three main objectives: economic liberalization, privatization of state-owned companies, and stabilization of inflation. The first reforms were implemented in three rounds: 1974–1983, 1985, and 1990. The reforms were continued and strengthened after 1990 by the post-Pinochet center government of Patricio Aylwin's Christian Democrats. However, the center-left government of Eduardo Frei Ruiz-Tagle also made a commitment to poverty reduction. In 1988, 48% of Chileans lived below the poverty line. By 2000 this had been reduced to 20%. A 2004 World Bank report attributed 60% of Chile's 1990's poverty reduction to economic growth, and claimed that government programs aimed at poverty alleviation accounted for the rest.

Hernán Büchi, Minister of Finance under Pinochet between 1985 and 1989, wrote a book detailing the implementation process of the economic reforms during his tenure. Successive governments have continued these policies. In 2002 Chile signed an association agreement with the European Union (comprising free trade and political and cultural agreements), in 2003, an extensive free trade agreement with the United States, and in 2004 with South Korea, expecting a boom in import and export of local produce and becoming a regional trade-hub. Continuing the coalition's free-trade strategy, in August 2006, President Bachelet promulgated a free trade agreement with the People's Republic of China (signed under the previous administration of Ricardo Lagos), the first Chinese free-trade agreement with a Latin American nation; similar deals with Japan and India were promulgated in August 2007. In 2010, Chile was the first nation in South America to win membership in the Organization of Economic Cooperation and Development, an organization restricted to the world's richest countries.

Some economists (such as Nobel laureate Amartya Sen) have argued that the experience of Chile in this period indicates a failure of the economic liberalism posited by thinkers such as Friedman, because there was little net economic growth from 1975 to 1982 (during the so-called "pure Monetarist experiment"). After the catastrophic banking crisis of 1982, the state controlled more of the economy than it had under the previous socialist government, and sustained economic growth only came after the later reforms that privatized the economy, while social indicators remained poor. The OECD economist Javier Santiso described this reorientation as "combining neo-liberal sutures and interventionist cures".

== Background ==
In 1972, Chile's inflation was at 150%. According to Hernán Büchi, several factors such as expropriations, price controls, and protectionism caused these economic problems. At the same time, the United States conducted an "economic pressure" campaign to weaken foreign investment in the country. The Central Bank increased the money supply to pay for the increasing deficit. Büchi states that this increase was the primary cause for inflation.

United States government documents report an antagonistic foreign economic policy toward the Allende government that was "articulated at the highest levels" during this time. Shortly after Salvador Allende was elected president, but before he assumed office, then-CIA-director Richard Helms met with President Richard Nixon and discussed the situation in Chile. Helms' notes from his September 15, 1970 meeting contain the indication: "Make the economy scream." A week later Ambassador Edward Korry reported telling outgoing Chilean president Eduardo Frei Montalva, through his Defense Minister, that "not a nut or bolt would be allowed to reach Chile under Allende." By late 1972, the Chilean Ministry of the Economy estimated that almost one-third of the diesel trucks at the Chuquicamata copper mine, 30 percent of the privately owned city buses, 21 percent of all taxis, and 33 percent of state-owned buses in Chile could not operate because of the lack of spare parts or tires. In overall terms, the value of United States machinery and transport equipment exported to Chile by U.S. firms declined from $153 million in 1970 to $110 million in 1971.

Immediately following the Chilean coup of 1973, Augusto Pinochet was made aware of a confidential economic plan known as El ladrillo (literally, "the brick"), so called because the report was "as thick as a brick". The plan had been quietly prepared in May 1973 by economists who opposed Salvador Allende's government, with the help from a group of economists the press were calling the Chicago Boys, because they were predominantly alumni of the University of Chicago. The document contained the backbone of what would later on become the Chilean economic policy. According to the 1975 report of a United States Senate Intelligence Committee investigation, the Chilean economic plan was prepared in collaboration with the CIA.

The plan recommended a set of economic reforms that included deregulation and privatization. Among other reforms, they made the central bank independent, cut tariffs, privatized the state-controlled pension system, state industries, and banks, and reduced taxes. Pinochet's stated aim was to "make Chile not a nation of proletarians, but a nation of entrepreneurs".

== Reforms ==
The first reforms were implemented in three rounds: 1974–1983, 1985, and 1990. The government welcomed foreign investment and eliminated protectionist trade barriers, forcing Chilean businesses to compete with imports on an equal footing, or else go out of business. The main copper company, Codelco, remained in government hands due to the nationalization of copper completed by Salvador Allende, however, private companies were allowed to explore and develop new mines.

Minister of Finance Sergio de Castro, departing from Friedman's support for free floating exchange rates, decided on a pegged exchange rate of 39 pesos per dollar in June 1979, under the rationale of bringing Chile's rampant inflation to heel. The result, however, was that a serious balance-of-trade problem arose, leading Milton Friedman to criticize De Castro and the fixed exchange rate in his Memoirs ("Chapter 24: Chile", 1998). Since Chilean peso inflation continued to outpace U.S. dollar inflation, every year Chilean buying power of foreign goods increased. When the bubble finally burst in late 1982, Chile slid into a severe recession that lasted more than two years. This deep economic recession of 1982–1983 was Chile's second in eight years. (In 1975, when GDP fell by 13 percent, industrial production plunged by 27 percent and unemployment increased to 20 percent). Additionally, inflation reached 375 percent in 1974—the highest rate in the world and almost twice the top level under Allende. During the 1982–1983 recession, real economic output declined by 19%, with most of the recovery and subsequent growth taking place after Pinochet left office, when market-oriented economic policies were additionally strengthened.

Starting in 1985, with Hernán Büchi as Minister of Finance, the focus of economic policies shifted toward financial solvency and economic growth. Exports grew rapidly and unemployment went down, however, poverty still represented a significant problem, with 45 percent of Chile's population below the poverty line in 1987. Büchi wrote about his experience during this period in his book La transformación económica de Chile: el modelo del progreso. In 1990, the newly elected Patricio Aylwin government undertook a program of "growth with equity", emphasizing both continued economic liberalization and poverty reduction. Between 1990 and 2000, poverty was reduced from 40 percent of the population to 20 percent. 60 percent of this reduction can be attributed to GDP growth, with the remaining 40 percent attributable social policies.

=== Free trade agreements ===
Successive Chilean governments have actively pursued trade-liberalizing agreements. The process began in the 1970s, when Pinochet cut tariffs on imports to 10%. Prior to that, Chile had been one of the most protectionist economies in the world, ranking 71 out of 72 in a 1975 Cato Institute and Fraser Institute annual report. During the 1990s, Chile signed free trade agreements (FTA) with Canada, Mexico, and Central America. Chile also concluded preferential trade agreements with Venezuela, Colombia, and Ecuador. An association agreement with Mercosur—Argentina, Brazil, Paraguay, and Uruguay—went into effect in October 1996.

== Performance on economic and social indicators ==
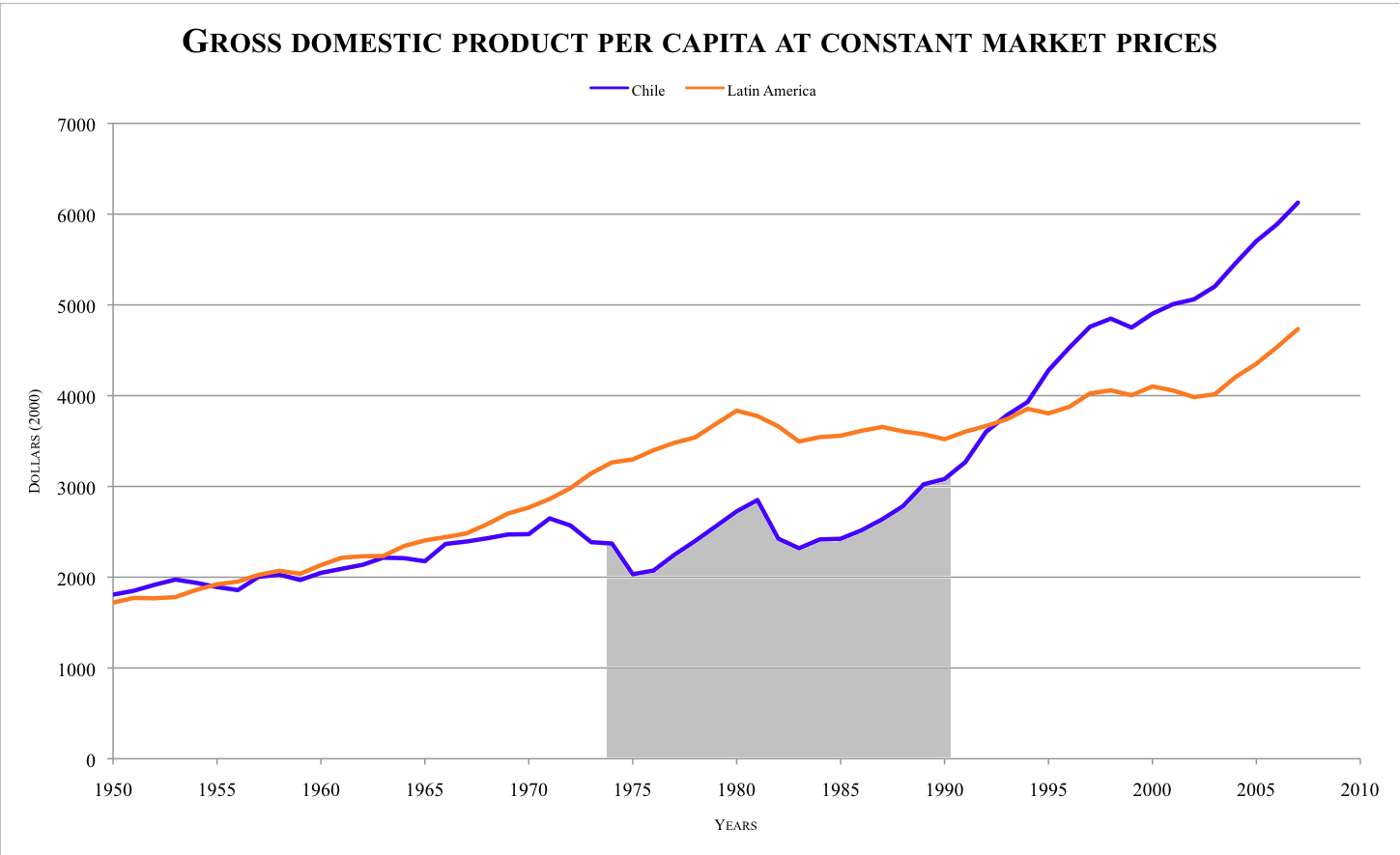
GDP per capita in Chile and Latin America (1950–2010)

Amartya Sen, in his book Hunger and Public Action, examines the performance of Chile in various economic and social indicators. He finds, from a survey of the literature on the field:

The so-called "monetarist experiment" which lasted until 1982 in its pure form, has been the object of much controversy, but few have claimed it to be a success...The most conspicuous feature of the post 1973 period is that of considerable instability...no firm and consistent upward trend (to say the least).

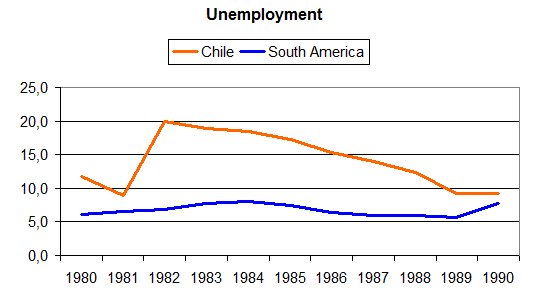
Unemployment in Chile and South America (1980–1990)

Nobel laureate and economist Gary Becker states that "Chile's annual growth in per capita real income from 1985 to 1996 averaged a remarkable 5 percent, far above the rest of Latin America." Since then the economy has averaged 3% annual growth in GDP. Becker also said, in 1997, that Chile had become "an economic role model for the whole underdeveloped world". Margaret Thatcher declared that Pinochet's regime had turned Chile "from chaotic collectivism into the model economy of Latin America" whereas George H. W. Bush asserted that "Chile's record of economic accomplishment is a lesson for Latin America on the power of the free market. Nowhere among the nations of this continent has the pace of free‐market reform gone farther, faster than right here in Chile".

Developments were positive with regards to infant mortality and life expectancy—infant mortality rate fell so much that Chile achieved the lowest level of infant mortality in Latin America in the 1980s. Infant mortality rate in Chile fell from 76.1 per 1000 to 22.6 per 1000 from 1970 to 1985. Between 1960 and 1995 infant mortality declined by "91%" from "118" per 1,000 live births to "11". A "63%" increase in life expectancy was also found in the same period from "57.3" to "74.9".

However, Sen claims that this improvement was not because of "free-market" policies but because of active public and state intervention. Chile had a very long tradition of public action for the improvement of childcare, which were largely maintained after the Pinochet coup:

... there is little disagreement as to what caused the observed improvement in the area of child health and nutrition...It would be hard to attribute the impressively steady decline in infant mortality ... (despite several major economic recessions) ... to anything else than the maintenance of extensive public support measures

Nevertheless, according to libertarian writer Axel Kaiser:

In short, thanks to the free‐market reforms introduced by the Chicago Boys and maintained by the democratic regimes that came later, Chile became the most prosperous country in Latin America, which mostly benefitted the poorest members of the population.

Performance on economic indicators in comparison to those of other Chilean presidencies:

Presidency	Alessandri (1959–64)	Frei-Montalva (1965–70)	Allende (1971–73)	Pinochet (1974–89)	Aylwin (1990–93)	Frei Ruiz-Tagle (1994–99)	Lagos (2000)
Economic growth (%)	3.7	4.0	1.2	2.9	7.7	5.6	5.4
Growth rate of exports	6.2	2.3	-4.2	10.6	9.6	9.4	7.5
Rate of unemployment (Workers in job creation programs counted as unemployed)	5.2	5.9	4.7	18.1	7.3	7.4	10.0
Real wages (1970 = 100)	62.2	84.2	89.7	81.9	99.8	123.4	134.4
Rate of inflation	26.6	26.3	293.8	79.9	17.7	6.1	4.5

== Milton Friedman ==
Milton Friedman gave some lectures advocating free market economic policies at the Universidad Católica de Chile. In 1975, two years after the coup, he met with Pinochet for 45 minutes, where the general "indicated very little indeed about his own or the government's feeling" and the president asked Friedman to write him a letter laying out what he thought Chile's economic policies should be, which he also did. To stop inflation, Friedman proposed reduction of government deficits that had increased in the past years and a flat commitment by government that after six months it will no longer finance government spending by creating money. He proposed relief of cases of real hardship among poorest classes. In October 1975 the New York Times columnist Anthony Lewis declared that "the Chilean junta's economic policy is based on the ideas of Milton Friedman…and his Chicago School".

Friedman wondered why some have attacked him for giving a lecture in Chile: "I must say, it's such a wonderful example of a double standard, because I had spent time in Yugoslavia, which was a communist country. I later gave a series of lectures in China. When I came back from communist China, I wrote a letter to the Stanford Daily newspaper in which I said, 'It's curious. I gave exactly the same lectures in China that I gave in Chile. I have had many demonstrations against me for what I said in Chile. Nobody has made any objections to what I said in China. How come?'" He noted that his visit was unrelated to the political side of the regime and that, during his visit to Chile, he even stated that following his economic liberalization advice would help bring political freedom and the downfall of the regime.

== Democracy ==
Commenting on his statement about the "Miracle", Friedman says that "the emphasis of that talk was that free markets would undermine political centralization and political control." Friedman stated that "The real miracle in Chile was not that those economic reforms worked so well, but because that's what Adam Smith said they would do. Chile is by all odds the best economic success story in Latin America today. The real miracle is that a military junta was willing to let them do it." Friedman said the "Chilean economy did very well, but more important, in the end the central government, the military junta, was replaced by a democratic society. So the really important thing about the Chilean business is that free markets did work their way in bringing about a free society."

== See also ==
- Pensions in Chile
- Economic history of Chile
- 2011–12 Chilean student protests

== Sources ==
- This article incorporates public domain material from Covert Action in Chile 1963—1973 (PDF). Select Committee to Study Governmental Operations with Respect to Intelligence Activities, United States Senate.
