= Década Perdida =

1980s financial crisis in Latin America

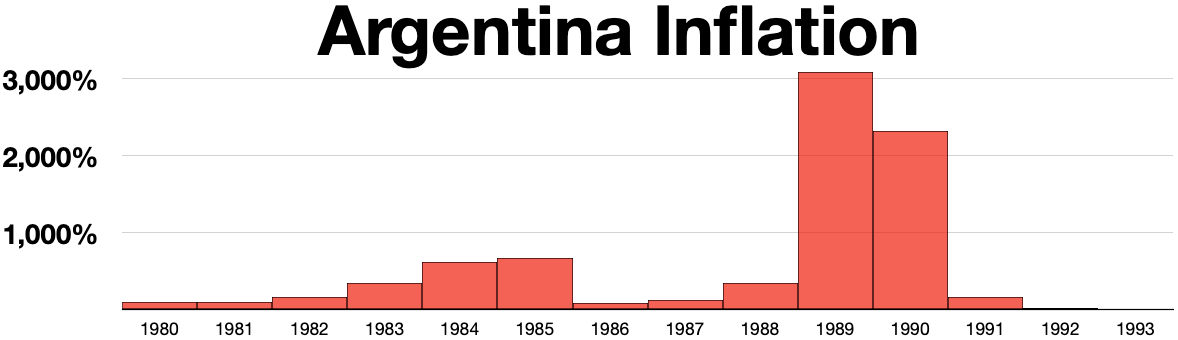
Argentina inflation 1980–1993

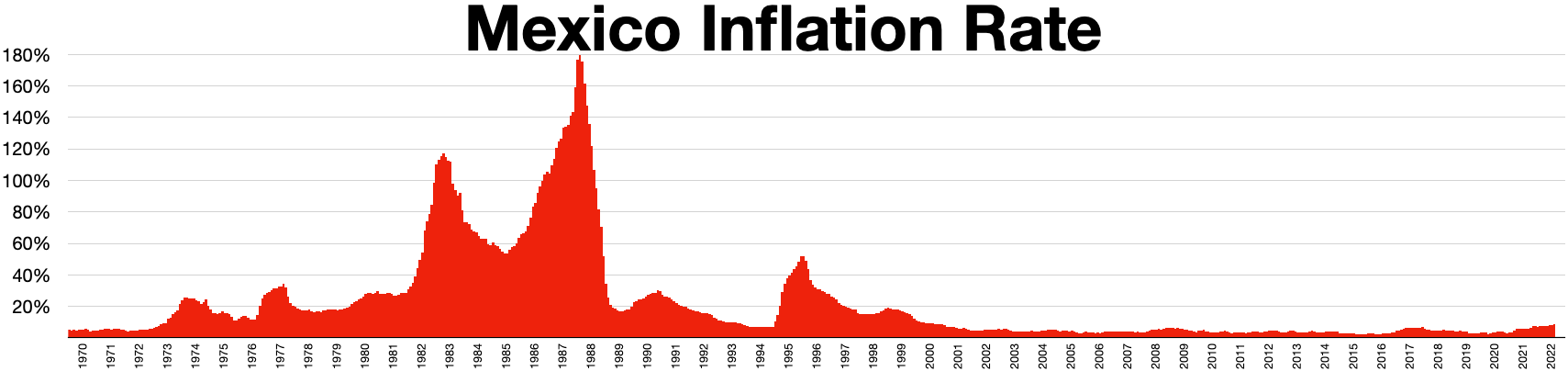
Mexico inflation rate 1970–2022

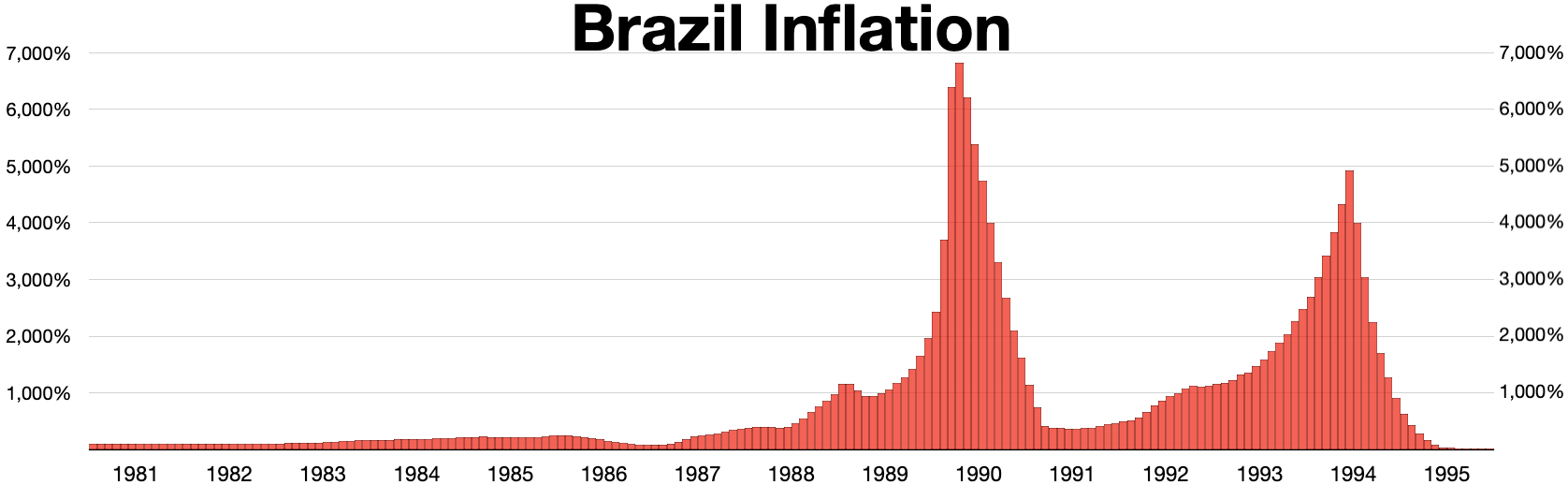
Brazil Inflation 1981–1995

"La Década Perdida" in Spanish or "A Década Perdida" in Portuguese ("The Lost Decade") of Latin America is a term used to describe the economic crisis suffered in Latin America during the 1980s, which continued for some countries into the 1990s. In general, the crisis was composed of unpayable external debts, taxes, and volatile inflation and exchange rates, which in the majority of the countries in the region were fixed.

During the 1970s, the rise in prices of raw materials (primarily oil) and the decrease in the value of the dollar caused US dollars to flow into Latin America, a region that then debated between an industrial model directed from the state or a market based model.

In 1980, the decreased price of raw materials and the rise of interest rates in the industrialized countries generated a lack of resources, which provoked a massive depreciation of exchange rates, appreciating the real interest rate on the debt, a situation made worse by the presence of excessively large bureaucracies.

In response to the crisis, the majority of the nations had to abandon their economic models of industrialization by substituting with imports, and they adopted a growth strategy oriented toward exports. This strategy was encouraged by the International Monetary Fund. There were exceptions, like Chile or Costa Rica, which briefly adopted reformist strategies. The real growth rate of gross domestic product (GDP) for the region was only 2.3% between 1980 and 1985. Between 1982 and 1985, Latin America paid 108 billion dollars in past debts.

In the beginning of the 1990s, Latin America was recuperating from the crisis, which nevertheless reconfigured the economic landscape of the region. The countries who previously were regional leaders like Argentina, Mexico, and Venezuela were left with diverse effects that hadn't been overcome. Meanwhile, countries that had fallen behind previously like Chile, Brazil, Peru, and Colombia stood out in the late 20th century with high economic growth and a better social wellbeing in relative terms.

== By country ==
=== Argentina ===
Since the early 1950s, the Argentine economy had experienced an almost permanent state of malaise, with irregular growth rates and inflation that continued to increase over the years, making economic management unsustainable. In 1975, the Minister of Economy under the government of María Estela Martínez de Perón, Celestino Rodrigo, implemented a shock plan that became known as the “Rodrigazo.” It sought to control the inflationary spiral but only succeeded in worsening the economic situation, representing a turning point in the country’s economic history.

In March 1976, the self-proclaimed National Reorganization Process military regime came to power and initiated a series of macroeconomic reforms, primarily through a process of economic liberalization marked by a massive influx of imports. This caused the decline of domestic industry, accompanied by a significant increase in unemployment, numerous bank runs, and corporate bankruptcies. Beginning in 1979, a series of devaluations took place, generating intense social unrest. This unrest worsened after the failed Falklands War in 1982, which paved the way for the return of democracy the following year.

When Raúl Alfonsín took office in 1983, attempts were made to revive the import-substitution model, with limited results. In 1985, the “Austral Plan” was launched under the supervision of the IMF. Despite its initial success, excessively expansionary economic policy prevented Argentina from meeting its payments, leading to a gradual economic deterioration that reached its peak between 1989 and 1990, with two episodes of hyperinflation. In 1989, Carlos Menem was elected. Following a new agreement with the IMF in 1990, he implemented a series of liberal policies, including the massive privatization of public companies and the establishment of parity between the peso and the U.S. dollar. These measures reduced inflation at the cost of higher unemployment, a development that became evident during the 1998–2002 crisis.

=== Bolivia ===
After experiencing a major economic boom during the 1970s, the Bolivian economy began to experience a slowdown in GDP growth, along with high inflation and an indiscriminate increase in debt.

Historically, the Bolivian economy had been based on tin mining. In 1982, the United States announced the sale of its large tin reserves, causing the price of the material to fall worldwide. This severely affected Bolivia, which at the time depended on extractive mining, as its hydrocarbon industry was not yet sufficiently developed.

After a long period of coups and military dictatorships in Bolivia, democracy returned to the country in October 1982 under President Hernán Siles Zuazo. One of his first measures was to restore the official exchange rate, but with exchange controls. The exchange rate was fixed after devaluing the official exchange rate of the previous system by 77%. Along with the return to a fixed and, initially, single exchange rate, the newly installed democratic government ordered a substantial increase in the prices of publicly provided goods and services, “de-dollarized” contracts between residents that had been agreed upon with dollar clauses, and significantly increased the minimum wage. At the same time, it announced that three months later a system for indexing wages to the cost of living would be introduced.

In May 1984, the government, under pressure from labor unions, declared a temporary suspension of payments to international commercial banks. This declaration had the opposite effect from what was expected: instead of easing the debt situation, it worsened it by opening another front with official financing institutions.

The worsening inflation led to significant political deterioration. President Siles Zuazo was forced by the opposition to call early elections in October 1984. Although unconstitutional, this measure provided a possible nonviolent way out of the crisis.

Subsequently, following a period of hyperinflation of the Bolivian peso, on November 28, 1986, President Víctor Paz Estenssoro signed a law providing for the introduction, on January 1, 1987, of a new fully convertible national currency, the boliviano, equivalent to one million pesos and with a flexible exchange rate against the dollar. After a transition period, it became the only legally accepted currency as of January 1, 1987. At that time, 1 dollar was worth 1.8–1.9 million pesos, while 1 boliviano was approximately equivalent to US$1.80.

=== Brazil ===
During the 1970s, the military regime took advantage of high oil prices to exploit its “comparative advantages” with the aim of deepening industrialization and thereby achieving high economic growth between 1974 and 1980, at the cost of increasing debt and inflation. By 1981, Brazil faced serious difficulties in meeting its obligations as interest rates rose. This led to the imposition of an austerity plan that unsuccessfully attempted to reduce the large fiscal deficits. The economic situation caused a major political crisis that, in 1985, brought 20 years of military dictatorship in Brazil to an end and marked the return of democracy under the Social Democratic Party.

By then, it had become imperative to adopt a fiscal policy capable of sustaining the public sector without resorting to inflation. The “Cruzado Plan” (Plano Cruzado) of 1986 was the first and most important of three heterodox economic shocks undertaken with the aim of neutralizing inflation through price controls. However, a series of mistakes—primarily the failure to address the situation of the public sector—led to their failure, while inflation continued to accelerate toward the end of the 1980s.

In 1990, the government of Fernando Collor de Mello initiated a series of free-market reforms that sought, among other things, to address Brazil’s technological lag resulting from the strict protectionism of the 1970s and 1980s. Although inflation was eventually brought under control, social cuts and a shortage of circulating money caused a political and social crisis that continued even after Collor’s removal from office in 1992. His successor, Vice President Itamar Franco, appointed Fernando Henrique Cardoso as Minister of Finance. Between 1993 and 1994, Cardoso developed the Real Plan (Plano Real), which stabilized the economy through greater economic liberalization, parity with the U.S. dollar, and fiscal balance.

=== Chile ===
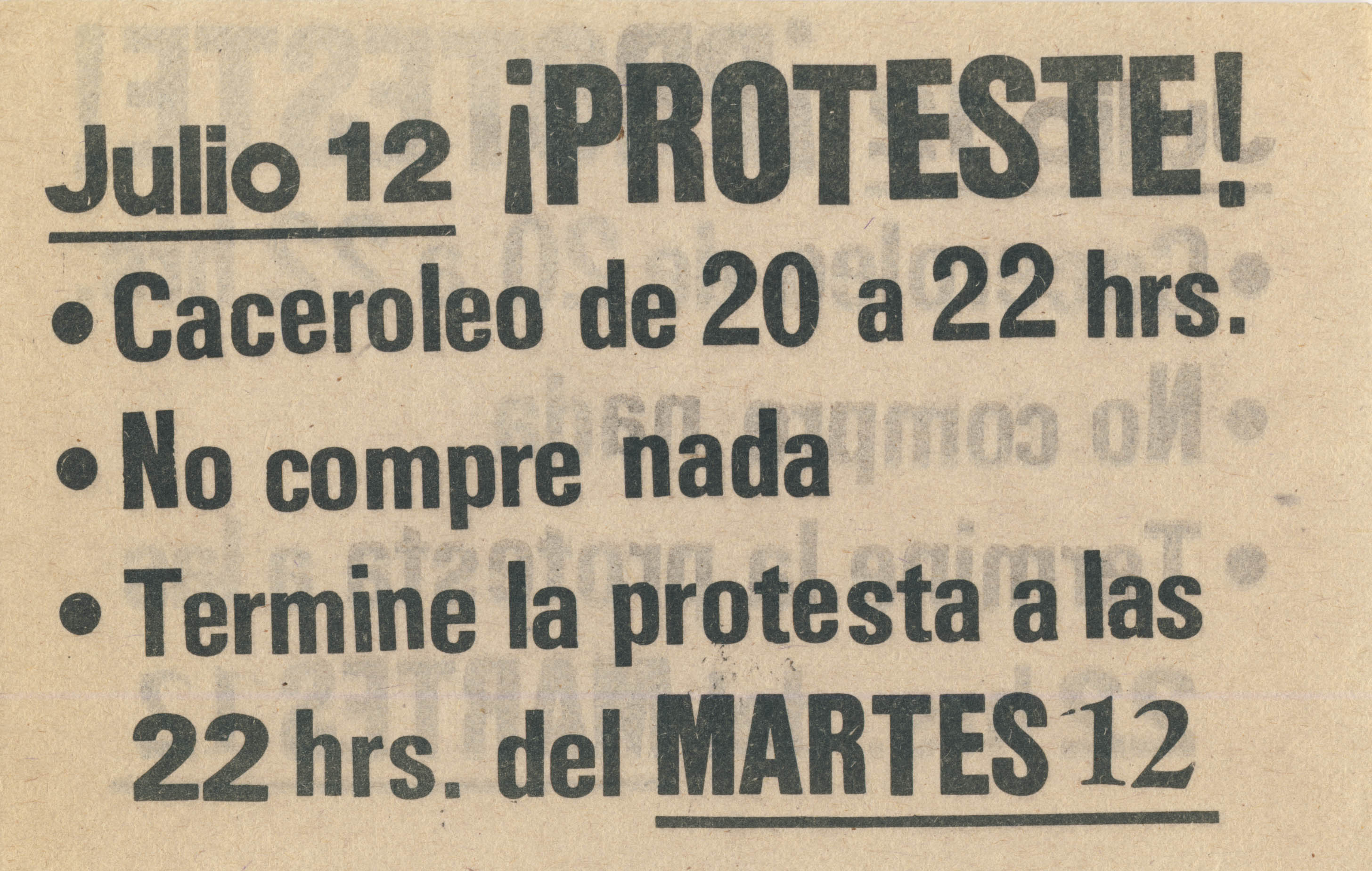
A Chilean pamphlet calling for protests, including a cacerolazo, in 1983.

The 1982 Chilean economic crisis took place during the military dictatorship led by General Augusto Pinochet, following years of economic reforms. Between 1977 and mid-1981, the economy experienced a period of economic expansion known as the Chilean miracle, characterized by a low value of the U.S. dollar. However, by the end of 1981, rising interest rates and lower copper prices led to excessive indebtedness. Combined with the unfavorable position of domestic industry in the face of imports, this resulted in a virtual paralysis of the economy, which the government attempted to overcome through Keynesian-style measures. In June 1982, the government devalued the peso by 100%, raising the price of the dollar from $39 (the fixed exchange rate since 1979) to $78. In August of that year, the foreign exchange market was liberalized, moving from a fixed system to a hybrid model.

On January 13, 1983, the Chilean state carried out a massive intervention in the banking sector, taking control of five banks and dissolving three others. By 1984, the state controlled more of the economy than the socialist government of Salvador Allende had prior to the military coup. Due to the limited results of the reforms, beginning in 1985 the military dictatorship changed its economic course by appointing Hernán Büchi as Minister of Finance. This brought about a prolonged period of high economic growth that continued into the early 1990s.

Supporters of the dictatorship's liberal economic policies have argued that the crisis originated outside Chile and affected all of Latin America in what became known as the Latin American debt crisis. Historians Gabriel Salazar and Julio Pinto Vallejos have responded that such crises are inherent weaknesses of the liberal model, or alternatively, of its abrupt implementation. It was the worst economic crisis in Chile since the Great Depression of 1929 and the 1973 economic crisis. Chilean GDP declined by 14.3%, while unemployment rose to 23.7%. The crisis has been identified as the trigger for a wave of protests against the military dictatorship, which continued for years as social indicators remained poor.

=== Colombia ===
During the 1980s, Colombia experienced a process of diversification in the coffee industry. Although the debt crisis did not have entirely direct consequences in Colombia, the country was able to cope with the situation, aided by the generally strong performance of its domestic industry. During that decade, the Colombian economy maintained an average annual growth rate of 5%. However, it had to confront a highly adverse internal situation due to the intensification of the Colombian armed conflict involving guerrilla groups and drug cartels.

=== Costa Rica ===
The 1980–1982 Costa Rican economic crisis was a severe financial crisis that struck the Central American country during the 1980s under the administration of Rodrigo Carazo Odio. It is considered one of the worst economic crises in the country's history and the worst of the 20th century.

The crisis devastated Costa Rica's economy, which at the time depended almost entirely on coffee and banana exports, whose international prices declined. Costa Rica's fiscal deficit stood at around 11%, which, combined with a deficit to finance the entire public sector, caused the country to default on its obligations to international organizations, which cut off access to financing. During this period, unemployment doubled from 4.4% in 1979 to 9.4% in 1982. Some of the economic consequences included shortages, hyperinflation, a rapid devaluation of the colón, and widespread public discontent.

=== Mexico ===
The "lost decade" refers to the period following Mexico's bankruptcy in 1982, when it was ultimately unable to meet its external debt payments to international organizations and other entities. This bankruptcy was primarily caused by rising interest rates in many industrialized countries, which resulted from various economic problems and caused capital to flow toward opportunities offering better short-term returns. Within this context of the international economy, at least four stages can be distinguished, each of which was essential to the political, economic, institutional, and social history of developing countries facing these problems.

Following the oil boom that preceded the government of Mexican President José López Portillo (1976–1982), the Mexican government became heavily dependent on oil exports to meet the country's financial needs. These exports were directed mainly toward the United States, taking advantage of the high oil prices generated primarily by the 1973 oil crisis.

When the market eventually stabilized, thereby reducing the high prices of crude oil per barrel, the country's financial stability was placed at risk. Diversification of income would have prevented the problem, but because other productive sectors were unable to compensate for the decline in oil revenues—many manufacturing industries depended heavily on government subsidies—Mexico was forced to devalue its currency, which by then had reached historic levels. During 1982, the Mexican peso was devalued by 500% shortly after López Portillo declared that he would defend the peso "like a dog" (como un perro). Under these circumstances, López Portillo nationalized all financial institutions on September 1, 1982, during his final public address to the nation.

During the following period, President Miguel de la Madrid sought to attract foreign investment and promote new trade agreements. These efforts culminated in Mexico's accession to the General Agreement on Tariffs and Trade (GATT) in January 1986. In 1987, he proposed his "Economic Solidarity Pact," which ultimately succeeded in controlling inflation, which had averaged 100% up to that point.

However, it was not until the end of 1989 that the economy stabilized through debt renegotiation and the implementation of market reforms by the government of Carlos Salinas de Gortari, generating high levels of economic growth that continued until 1993. Nevertheless, heavy bureaucracy and an exchange rate overvalued by the parity between the new peso and the U.S. dollar, together with political instability in the south of the country, triggered an economic crisis in 1994. This crisis affected economies throughout the Americas, with repercussions that continued to be felt thereafter.

=== Peru ===
With the end of the Revolutionary Government of the Armed Forces in 1980, President Fernando Belaúnde Terry attempted to implement market reforms to modernize the economy. However, the heavy legacy of the previous regime and the debt crisis caused significant economic deterioration, aggravated by the El Niño phenomenon, which devastated agriculture, and the escalation of terrorism by Shining Path.

Persistent inflation led to the introduction of the inti as the national currency in 1985, replacing the old sol. That year, Alan García assumed the presidency for the first time, with a heterodox economic program that sought increased fiscal spending and restrictions on external debt payments. However, his government was marked by hyperinflation and rising poverty, which increased from 41% to 55% between 1985 and 1991, the year the nuevo sol was introduced.

In 1990, Alberto Fujimori was elected president. By then, Peru's per capita income was $720 per year, a level comparable to that of 1960 in nominal terms. Fujimori implemented drastic liberalizing reforms, including major budget cuts, the privatization of state-owned enterprises, the removal of restrictions on private investment, and the end of protectionism. These measures kept inflation under control. Many of these reforms were carried out undemocratically following the 1992 self-coup, and they helped put Peru on a path toward sustained economic growth during most of the 1990s, laying the economic foundations for the so-called "Peruvian miracle" (milagro peruano) of the first and second decades of the new century.

=== Uruguay ===
The Uruguayan economy in the 1980s was marked by an economic and financial crisis, which culminated in 1982 with the collapse of the "tablita" and a devaluation of more than 50%. The tablita, implemented by the military regime beginning in 1978, was a fixed exchange rate announced several months in advance to control the rate of devaluation.

The crisis was caused by the loss of reserves held by the Central Bank of Uruguay, which reached $50 million per week in November 1982.

With financial assistance from the International Monetary Fund, the country was able to overcome the crisis.

By the second half of the 1980s, with democracy restored, during the first government of Julio María Sanguinetti, the economy was able to recover, although with certain difficulties. It continued to grow during the 1990s under Luis Alberto Lacalle and during Sanguinetti's second government, although problems resurfaced in 1999, eventually triggering the 2002 economic crisis.

=== Venezuela ===
The Venezuelan economy benefited from high oil prices during the oil crisis of the 1970s and from the surplus revenues they generated. This prompted the government of Carlos Andrés Pérez to nationalize basic industries and take on foreign debt during a period known as "Saudi Venezuela" (Venezuela Saudi). In 1981 and 1982, economic growth was virtually nonexistent, and by 1983 the external debt had become unpayable. As a result, the government of Luis Herrera Campíns was forced to devalue the currency in the episode known as "Black Friday" (Viernes Negro). From that point until the end of the 1990s, the economic crisis became a succession of devaluations and inflationary volatility, leading to the loss of thousands of jobs and plunging the country into severe poverty, from which some economists and politicians believe the country has not fully recovered. Some of the policies used to curb the structural effects of the crisis included the foreign exchange controls implemented by Herrera Campíns and price controls introduced by his successor Jaime Lusinchi. These measures resulted in administrative corruption and black markets for goods and foreign currency. Meanwhile, the structural collapse of the domestic market and the lack of economic and food sovereignty generated gradually increasing shortages.

On December 4, 1988, Carlos Andrés Pérez was elected for a second time, receiving 3,879,024 votes (52.91% of voters), a very high figure achieved through a populist discourse appealing to social justice, as well as memories of the prosperity experienced during his previous government. With this strong electoral mandate, Pérez's government sought to liberalize the economy, unlike during his first administration, implementing deregulation through a macroeconomic adjustment program promoted by the International Monetary Fund (IMF). Known as the "Economic Package" (Paquete Económico), it included decisions concerning exchange-rate policy, external debt, foreign trade, the financial system, fiscal policy, public services, privatization, and social policy.

Only a few weeks after President Pérez took office, the government decided to immediately implement the adjustment package and economic measures. On February 26, 1989, the Ministry of Energy and Mines announced a 30% increase in gasoline prices and a 30% increase in urban and interurban public transportation fares, effective February 27. The increases were to remain in effect for the following three months, after which fares could be increased by up to 100%.

The measures imposed by the government and the rising poverty rate sparked popular protests, looting, and the subsequent massacre that took place on February 28, when security forces from the Metropolitan Police, the Armed Forces, and the National Guard took to the streets to restore order. Although official figures for the event known as the Caracazo reported 276 deaths and numerous injuries, some unofficial reports have cited more than 300 deaths and as many as 3,000 people disappeared. During the 1990s, economic stagnation worsened, contributing to the discrediting of Venezuela's political class and growing support for more radical policies. This led to numerous uprisings and coup attempts, eventually culminating in the rise of Chavism toward the end of the century.

== The second "Década Perdida" ==
Various publications, including El País and CNN en Español had indicated that the decade from 2012 marked a "second lost decade" for Latin America, due to the significant fall of the regional economic indices. During the second half of the decade, almost all the countries of the subcontinent traversed periods of no growth or an economic recession, which led to a turbulent political and social scene.

Between 2003 and 2012, Latin America lived through years of stability (which included a boom in some cases) due to the high demand for raw materials partly due to the Asian Market. This demand came primarily from China, which navigated the subprime crisis of 2008 with little difficulty. Benefitting from the weakening of the currencies from industrialized countries, they could obtain greater quantities of foreign currency. This period was known as the "gained decade," particularly by the center-left governments as a part of the "red tide" movement which had its best moment in that period.

However, the slowing down of China from 2012, and the consequent fall in the price of raw materials led to a new scenario. In 2011 the region had its last year of strong growth (greater than 4% annual), while 2012 was slightly better than 3% and between the years 2013 and 2015 it was below 2%. During the years 2016 and 2017 economic activity in Latin America decreased for the first time since 2002, and in 2018 it barely passed 1%. The poverty in the subcontinent also grew starting in 2014, for the first time since the 1980s.

The effect of this situation was that Latin America lived through a "conservative wave" that included the general election of right leaning leaders in a region that during the previous century had for the most part elected left leaning governments. It was suggested that these aggressive political changes tended to strengthen exterior commerce and equilibrate fiscal accounts. However, the commercial war between the United States and China and new increases in the value of the dollar worsened the regional economic situation in Latin America even more. In the last part of the 2010s, in various countries, there were diverse episodes of social disturbances.

Venezuela was the country most affected by the economic crisis due to a mix of an extreme dependence on petroleum (the value of which plummeted between 2012 and 2015), inflation, a corrupt central bank, and a lack of economic support from foreign countries. This created a situation of catastrophic proportions, including industrial paralysis, shortages, and problems with public services.

Brazil, a country which had one of the largest increases on the global level during the 2000s, remained stuck in a period of decrease starting in 2012, a situation influenced by the hosting of the World Cup in 2014 and Olympics in 2016. The mega events organized in and hosted by the nation generated a wave of protests, while between 2014 and 2016 the economy entered into a recession.

== See also ==
- Lost Decade (Peru)
- Chilean crisis of 1982
- Latin American debt crisis
- L-shaped recession
- El Caracazo
- Hyperinflation in Brazil
