= Ricardo García Rodríguez =

Chilean politician (1930–2022)

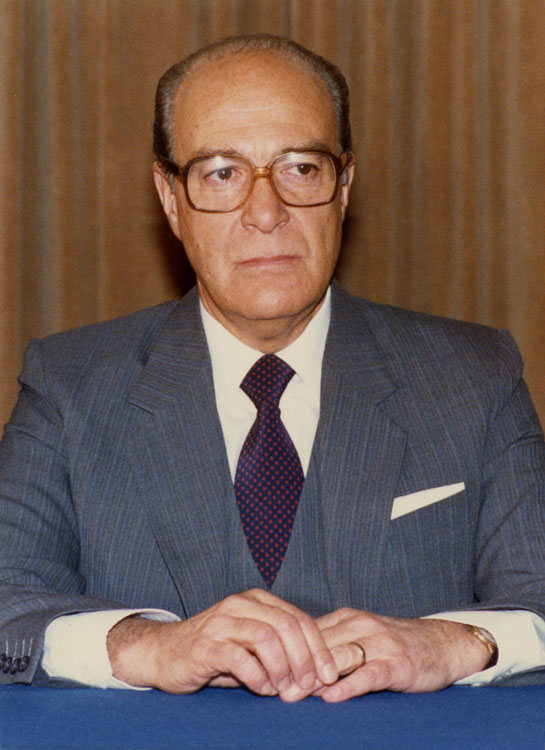

Member of the Constitutional Court
- In office 1989–1997

Minister of Foreign Affairs
- In office 11 July 1987 – 21 November 1988
- Preceded by: Jaime del Valle
- Succeeded by: Hernán Felipe Errázuriz

Minister of the Interior
- In office 12 February 1985 – 11 July 1987
- Preceded by: Sergio Onofre Jarpa
- Succeeded by: Sergio Fernández Fernández

Personal details
- Born: 3 December 1930 Valparaíso, Chile
- Died: 14 June 2022 (aged 91) Santiago, Chile
- Party: Christian Democratic Party (−1973)
- Spouse: Sylvia Lisa Holtz
- Education: Pontifical Catholic University of Valparaíso (LL.B)
- Profession: Lawyer

Ricardo García Rodríguez (3 December 1930 – 14 June 2022) was a Chilean lawyer and politician who served as minister.

== Early life and education ==
Rodríguez was born in Valparaíso on 3 December 1930, the son of Juan Facundo Severo García Luco and María Carolina Rodríguez Barros. He completed his primary and secondary education at the Colegio de los Sagrados Corazones in Valparaíso, where he received all the school’s distinctions.

While studying at the Sagrados Corazones school, he met Carlos Cáceres Contreras, who would later become his student when Rodríguez taught law at the School of Business in the Pontifical Catholic University of Valparaíso.

== Career ==
During his youth, he was a member of the Christian Democratic Party (PDC). Later, on 13 February 1985, he was appointed Minister of the Interior by General Augusto Pinochet, a move that came as a surprise given his limited prior experience in politics.

As the successor to Sergio Onofre Jarpa, during his first month in office he had to confront the Caso Degollados, which culminated in the resignation of the Director General of Carabineros, César Mendoza. In 1986, he also faced the Caso Quemados, in which Rodrigo Rojas de Negri was killed and Carmen Gloria Quintana suffered severe burns, as well as the assassination attempt against Augusto Pinochet, after which he decreed a state of siege.

On the other hand, during his tenure new laws were enacted on political parties, elections and vote counting, and electoral registers, as well as legislation establishing the Electoral Qualification Courts and the law governing the National Congress of Chile. In addition, in April 1987, he was responsible for coordinating the visit of Pope John Paul II.

On 11 July 1987, he assumed office as Minister of Foreign Affairs, a position he held until 21 November 1988. The following year, he was appointed a member of the Constitutional Court, where he served until 1997.

== Family ==
In 1962, he married Sylvia Lisa Holtz Weisser, of German descent, with whom he had five children.

His brother, Juan Ignacio, a lawyer by profession, served, among other roles, as Director of the Electoral Service between 1986 and 2013.

== Death ==
He died in Santiago on 14 June 2022, at the age of 91, as a result of respiratory failure.
