= IANSA =

IANSA may refer to:

- IANSA (company), a Chilean sugar refining company founded in 1953.
- IANSA (NGO), an international non-governmental organisation against gun violence.
- Iansã, an alternative name for the Orisha Oya in Latin America
