= Chicago Boys =

Chilean economists and political advisors

The Chicago Boys were a group of Chilean economists who rose to prominence in the 1970s and 1980s. Most were educated at the University of Chicago Department of Economics under influential figures like Milton Friedman, Arnold Harberger, and Larry Sjaastad, or at its academic partner, the Pontificia Universidad Católica de Chile. After returning to Latin America, they assumed key roles as economic advisors in several South American governments, most notably the military dictatorship of Chile (1973–1990), where many attained the highest economic offices. Their free-market policies later influenced conservative governments abroad, including those of Ronald Reagan in the United States and Margaret Thatcher in the United Kingdom.

== Origins and the Chile Project ==
The term "Chicago Boys" emerged in the 1980s to describe Latin American economists who espoused the liberal economic theories taught at the University of Chicago. Their training stemmed from the "Chile Project," an initiative organized in the 1950s by the U.S. State Department under the Point Four Program, the first U.S. global economic development scheme. Funded by the Ford Foundation and the Rockefeller Foundation, the project aimed to reshape Chilean economic thought.

The University of Chicago's Economics Department established scholarship programs with Chile's Catholic University. Between 1955 and 1973, one hundred twenty-six selected Chilean students underwent training, first in Chile and then in postgraduate studies at Chicago. This happened in two waves: The first wave from 1955 to 1964 in a programme set up by the United States Agency for International Development (AID) and the second wave from 1965 to 1973, funded by the Ford Foundation. Professor Larry Sjaastad was a central figure, supervising 139 doctoral dissertations, many for Latin American students, during his 42-year tenure.

== Rise to power ==
The Chicago Boys' ideas remained marginal in Chilean politics until the early 1970s. A group of them prepared a comprehensive 189-page economic blueprint titled El ladrillo ("the brick"), which was presented during Jorge Alessandri's unsuccessful 1969 presidential campaign. Alessandri rejected the plan, but it was revived following the 1973 Chilean coup d'état that brought General Augusto Pinochet to power, ultimately forming the basis of the new regime's economic policy. As Milton and Rose Friedman noted in their memoir: "In 1975, when inflation still raged and a world recession triggered a depression in Chile, General Pinochet turned to the 'Chicago Boys'; he appointed several of them to powerful positions in the government."

== Economic policies and impact ==
As the principal economic architects of the Pinochet regime, the Chicago Boys implemented a radical program of neoliberal reforms. Their policies, often described as "shock therapy," aimed to curb hyperinflation and stimulate growth through severe austerity, deep cuts in government spending, widespread deregulation, and the privatization of state-owned enterprises. They also liberalized trade, dismantling protectionist barriers to integrate Chile into the global market.

The immediate results were severe. By 1982, Chile's GDP had contracted by approximately 15%, and the reforms exacerbated income inequality, a legacy that continues to affect the country. However, these market-oriented policies, underpinned by the anti-Marxist ideology of the junta, were framed as a necessary corrective to the preceding socialist policies and a bulwark against communism during the Cold War.

The relationship between the Chicago Boys and international financial institutions like the International Monetary Fund (IMF) was complex, marked by both alignment and rivalry. The combination of free-market capitalism with authoritarian political control became a hallmark of Pinochetism, and the Chicago Boys' policies remain deeply controversial in Chile and internationally.

== International influence ==
The perceived economic success of the Chicago Boys, often termed the "Chilean Miracle," provided the Pinochet regime with a degree of international legitimacy, helping to offset criticism of its human rights record. Their pioneering use of structural adjustment, tax cuts, and free-trade policies attracted the attention of conservative leaders worldwide. The Chilean experiment served as a key case study for the application of Chicago School principles and influenced the neoliberal turn in the United States and United Kingdom during the 1980s.

Scholars have extensively analyzed the long-term significance of this influence. The Chicago Boys' restructuring of Chile's economy is a pivotal chapter in the history of neoliberal policy. While credited by supporters with creating a stable and growing economy, critics highlight the social costs, including increased inequality and the implementation of these policies under a repressive dictatorship.

== Later history and legacy ==
Following the end of military rule and the return to democracy in 1990, the Chicago Boys as a cohesive group lost direct political power, with many moving into the private sector. However, the core tenets of their economic model remained largely in place.

The academic connection between Chile and the University of Chicago endured beyond the original Chile Project. Alumni networks, including the Chicago Boys, are maintained through organizations like the "Latin American Business Group at Chicago Booth School of Business." The term "Chicago Boys" persists in popular culture, media, and academic discourse, and was the title of a 2015 Chilean documentary film.

== Notable members ==
=== In Chile ===
- Jorge Cauas, Minister of Finance (1975–1977)
- Sergio de Castro, Minister of Finance (1977–1982)
- Pablo Baraona, Minister of Economy (1976–1979)
- José Piñera, Minister of Labor and Pensions (1978–1980); Minister of Mining (1980–1981)
- Hernán Büchi, Minister of Finance (1985–1989)
- Alvaro Bardón, President of the Central Bank of Chile; Minister of Economy (1982–1983)
- Juan Carlos Méndez, Budget Director (1975–1981)
- Sergio de la Cuadra, President of the Central Bank of Chile; Minister of Finance (1982)
- Rolf Lüders, Minister of Economy (1982); Minister of Finance (1982–83)
- Miguel Kast, Minister of Planning (1978–1980); Labor Minister (1980–1982); Governor of the Central Bank of Chile (1982–83)
- Joaquín Lavín, Minister of Education (2010–2011); Minister of Planning (2011–2013)
- Cristián Larroulet Vignau, Minister of the General Secretariat to the Presidency (2010–2014)
- Ricardo Ffrench-Davis, often termed a "heterodox" or "anti" Chicago Boy for his critical stance.

=== Elsewhere in Latin America ===
Graduates from the University of Chicago influenced economic policies across the region, including:

- Mexico: Sócrates Rizzo, Francisco Gil Díaz
- Argentina: Adolfo Diz, Roque Fernández, Ricardo Lopez Murphy
- Brazil: Paulo Guedes
- Other economists in Peru, Colombia, Uruguay, Costa Rica, and Panama.

== See also ==
- Miracle of Chile
- Berkeley Mafia (Indonesia)
- Rolex 12 (Philippines)
- Shock Therapy
- The Shock Doctrine
