= Fernando Demaria (motivational speaker) =

Chilean motivational speaker

- Born: Fernando Demaria Lüders; 16 October 1992 (age 33); Santiago, Chile
- Other name: Nano Demaria
- Education: Andrés Bello National University
- Occupations: Motivational speaker; disability advocate; former motocross and enduro athlete; engineer
- Years active: 2012–present
- Height: 1.88 m (6 ft 2 in)
- Relatives: Rolf Lüders (grandfather)
- Website: nanodemaria.com

Fernando Demaria Lüders (born October 16, 1992, in Santiago, Chile), also known as Nano Demaria, is a Chilean motivational speaker and former motocross and enduro athlete. He was a gold and silver medalist at the International Six Days Enduro (ISDE) World Championships in Mexico in 2010, and Finland in 2011; and a former runner-up in the Chilean national enduro championships.

After being paralysed from a serious injury he incurred while competing in 2012, Demaria has subsequently become a commercial engineer, and launched a career as a speaker, giving motivational talks about resilience.

== Biography ==
Demaria is the son of former Chilean rugby national Pablo Demaria Lucchini and former model Pilar Lüders Norris. His maternal grandfather is the economist and academic Rolf Lüders. Demaria studied at Craighouse School, graduating in 2011.

After suffering a serious accident while competing in the first round of the 2012 FIM Enduro World Championship in Talca, he was transferred by helicopter to the Clínica Alemana. The accident left him with C5 tetraplegia and no mobility. That year he began his rehabilitation at the Chilean Safety Association Worker's Hospital in Santiago and the Luis Krebs Institute in Viña del Mar.

In 2013, he commenced studying commercial engineering at Andrés Bello National University, where his physical condition required him to take oral tests. Graduating in 2017, Demaria obtained an MBA in 2018.

Demaria later began giving motivational talks on resilience, and was invited to speak at TEDxVitacura Talks in 2024. Through his social networks, he shares educational and training information on disability care. He drives his own car, and practices handcycling, skiing, diving, and parachuting. A video published in 2018 showed Demaria also participating in snow and off-road cross-country rally competitions, including the Desert Challenge, competing against able-bodied athletes.

== Awards ==
- UNAB Pride 2014. Andrés Bello National University
- 50 Heroes of Sports Award. La Tercera newspaper
