= Sergio Fernández Fernández =

Chilean politician (1939–2024)

Sergio Fernández
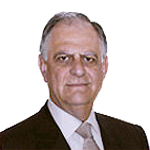

Member of the Senate
- In office 11 March 1998 – 11 March 2006
- Preceded by: Rolando Calderón
- Succeeded by: Carlos Bianchi Chelech
- Constituency: Magallanes Region (19th Circumscription)
- In office 11 March 1990 – 11 March 2006
- Appointed by: Patricio Aylwin
- Preceded by: Creation of the Office
- Succeeded by: Edgardo Boeninger
- Constituency: Designated

Minister of the Interior
- In office 11 July 1987 – 21 October 1988
- President: Augusto Pinochet
- Preceded by: Ricardo García Rodríguez
- Succeeded by: Carlos Cáceres Contreras
- In office 14 April 1978 – 22 April 1982
- President: Augusto Pinochet
- Preceded by: César Benavides
- Succeeded by: Enrique Montero Marx

General Comptroller of Chile
- In office 30 December 1977 – 12 April 1978
- Preceded by: Héctor Humeres
- Succeeded by: Osvaldo Iturriaga

Minister of Labor and Social Provision
- In office 8 March 1976 – 1 January 1978
- Preceded by: Nicanor Díaz Estrada
- Succeeded by: Vasco Costa Ramírez

Personal details
- Born: 28 January 1939 Santiago, Chile
- Died: 1 April 2024 (aged 85)
- Party: Independent Democratic Union (UDI) (1983–2024)
- Spouse: María Eugenia Díaz
- Children: Four
- Parent(s): Florentino Fernández; Argentina Fernández
- Education: University of Chile (LL.B)
- Occupation: Lawyer, politician

Sergio Ramiro Fernández Fernández (28 January 1939 – 1 April 2024) was a Chilean politician who served as a Senator and minister. Fernández Fernández died from cancer on 1 April 2024, at the age of 85.

A founding member of the Independent Democratic Union (UDI). He served as an appointed (institutional) senator from 1990 to 1998, and as an elected senator for the 19th Senatorial District (Magallanes and Chilean Antarctica Region) from 1998 to 2006.

During the military government of Augusto Pinochet, he held several cabinet positions, including Minister of Labor and Social Security (1976–1978) and Minister of the Interior (1978–1982; 1987–1988).

== Early life and education ==
Fernández was born in Punta Arenas on 28 January 1939. He was the son of Florentino Fernández Álvarez and Argentina Fernández Villa, Spanish-born merchants settled in the Magallanes region. He married María Eugenia Díaz Andrés, with whom he had four children.

He completed his primary education at the British School and his secondary education at the Luis Alberto Barrera High School, both in Punta Arenas. He later studied law at the University of Chile, graduating as a lawyer in 1963.

== Professional career ==
After qualifying as a lawyer, Fernández combined legal practice with academic work. In 1971, he served as professor of Civil Law at the Faculty of Law of the University of Chile. In 1972, he joined the Banking Pension Fund (Caja Bancaria de Pensiones) as a legal adviser, becoming deputy manager in 1973 and general manager in 1974.

In 1975, he became a member of the commission tasked with reforming the Chilean Civil Code. That same year, he became a partner at the law firm Schweitzer & Cía., where he later resumed professional practice after leaving public office.

== Political career ==
Fernández collaborated closely with the military government led by Augusto Pinochet, entering public service on the recommendation of former deputy and minister Hugo Rosende. On 8 March 1976, he was appointed Minister of Labor and Social Security, a position he held until 1 January 1978. He subsequently served as Comptroller General of the Republic until April 1978, playing a key role in the organization of the National Consultation of 4 January 1978.

On 14 April 1978, he was appointed Minister of the Interior, becoming the first civilian to hold that position during the military regime. He served until 22 April 1982. During this period, he participated in the drafting of the 1980 Constitution and signed the constitutional text in his capacity as head of the cabinet. He was also involved in the enactment of the 1978 Amnesty Law.

After leaving the Ministry of the Interior, Fernández served from March 1983 to July 1988 as president of the Commission for the Study of Organic Constitutional Laws. He was also a member of the Fourth Legislative Commission, responsible for internal affairs, foreign relations, national defense, and transport and telecommunications.

On 24 September 1983, he was one of the founding members of the Independent Democratic Union (UDI), alongside Jaime Guzmán and Pablo Longueira, among others.

On 7 July 1987, Fernández was reappointed Minister of the Interior, assuming responsibility for overseeing the 1988 plebiscite. His objective was to secure victory for the “Yes” option, which sought to extend Pinochet’s rule until 1997. Following the victory of the “No” option on 5 October 1988, he resigned on 21 October and was succeeded by Carlos Cáceres Contreras.

On 19 December 1989, in accordance with the constitutional framework in force at the time, he was appointed senator by Pinochet in his capacity as former Minister of State, serving as an institutional senator from 1990 to 1998.

In the 1997 parliamentary elections, Fernández ran for the Senate in the 19th Senatorial District (Magallanes Region) as part of the Union for Chile electoral pact. He was elected with 14,187 votes (24.17%). In 2005, he sought reelection in the same district, obtaining 10,910 votes (16.55%), but was not reelected.

After leaving the Senate on 11 March 2006, he returned to private legal practice at Schweitzer & Cía. Fernández died in Santiago on 1 April 2024.
