= Cristián Larroulet =

Chilean politician (b. 1953)

Cristián Larroulet Vignau
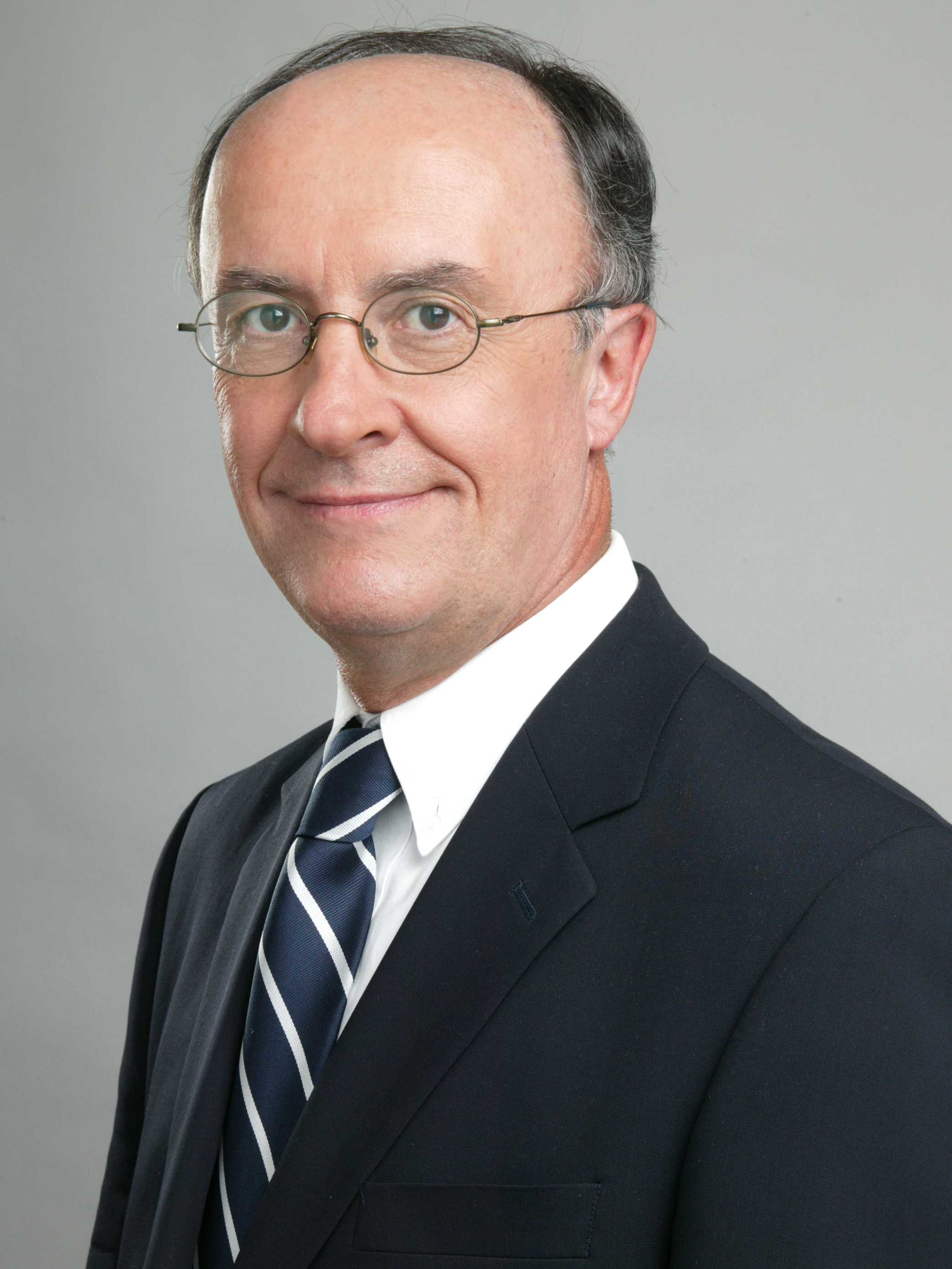

Minister Secretary-General of the Presidency of Chile
- In office 11 March 2010 – 11 March 2014
- Preceded by: José Antonio Viera-Gallo
- Succeeded by: Ximena Rincón

Personal details
- Born: 26 July 1953 (age 73) Santiago, Chile
- Spouse: María Isabel Philippi Irarrázabal
- Children: 7
- Education: Pontifical Catholic University of Chile
- Occupation: Economist, Academic, Researcher

Cristián Patricio Larroulet Vignau (born 1953 in Temuco) was the Minister General Secretariat of the Presidency of Chile under President Sebastián Piñera. He served as the Head of Advisors to the Presidency of the Republic in the second administration of Sebastián Piñera.

Larroulet graduated from high school at Colegio Sagrados Corazones de Manquehue, and he obtained his Business Administration degree from the Pontifical Catholic University of Chile and a master's degree in economics from the University of Chicago, United States of America. He was present in the Acto de Chacarillas in 1977, a ritualized pro-Pinochet act reminiscent of Francoist Spain.

Larroulet was a professor at the Universidad Católica, Universidad Adolfo Ibañez, and at the School of Economics of the Universidad de Chile. He was a visiting researcher at the Institute of The Americas, the University of California, San Diego, United States of America. He was dean of the Economics and Business Faculty at the Universidad del Desarrollo. He is currently a member of the Mont Pelerin Society and of the Social Science Academy, Politics and Moral, of the Chile Institute.

Larroulet has experience in the design and implementation of political policies. He was Chief of Staff of the Treasury under former Minister Hernán Büchi, and was the executive director of the Instituto Libertad y Desarrollo. From that position, he advised the National Congress on a wide range of policy subjects and he is a member of several commissions, such as the one that led to the General Education Law as well as the new Corporate Governance agreement for Codelco.

Larroulet's contributions have been recognized with distinctions on several occasions, such as Economist of the Year in 2009 by the newspaper El Mercurio.

In May 2010 he was distinguished with the Professional Achievement Award 2010 by the University of Chicago, being the only Latin-American which has received this recognition, granted since 1967.

He has written different academic publications in Chile and abroad. He is the author of the books "Economics", published by McGraw-Hill, "Chile, Camino al Desarrollo", published on 2012 by Aguilar/El Mercurio and "La Educación en la Encrucijada: ¿Estado Docente o Sociedad Docente?", published on 2015 by RIL.

== Criticism ==
Since assuming as Head of Advisors to the Presidency of the Republic during the second administration of Sebastián Piñera, Cristián Larroulet's performance received public criticism. Most critics described him as exerting an excessive and uncontested influence in key government decisions, pointed to his alleged efforts in defending the neoliberal paradigm within the Piñera government after the Chilean Protests from October 2019, and to his refusal to make "ideological concessions" to provide state aid in the frame of the Coronavirus Pandemic in Chile. While commenting the performance of Piñera's administration during the Chilean Protests, the education expert Mario Waissbluth described both Piñera's and Larroulet's management of the crisis as "ideological and suicidal governmental stinginess".

Criticism of Larroulet has also come from Piñera's own government coalition. Referring to him, Mayor Germán Codina from the political party Renovación Nacional, pointed in December 2019 that "some people advise the president badly" and that "politics is not just numbers."

In April 2020, after President Sebastián Piñera questioned the realization of Chile's 2020 National Plebiscite during a television interview, the deputy of his coalition, Ximena Ossandón, accused that in Chile "there is an extreme right-wing sector that never wanted the plebiscite", and added "I believe there are traces of the Head of Advisors Cristián Larroulet again (...) I have seen how the government made a U-turn, it was very pro-plebiscite and now doesn't want the plebiscite. I think of La Moneda, and I think of Cristián Larroulet."

Following a televised debate of the Chile Vamos 2021 presidential primaries it was noted by El Mostrador that association to Larroulet had effectively become a smear among right-wing candidates.

== Publications ==
- La Educación en la Encrucijada: ¿Estado Docente o Sociedad Docente?, 2015
- Chile, Camino al Desarrollo, 2012
- Entrepreneurship and Growth: A Latin American Paradox?, 2009
- Chile: libertad económica 1860-2007, 2009
- Concesiones: Agenda para el 2020. Prólogo, 2009
- Emprendimiento: Factor clave para la nueva etapa de Chile, 2007
- La lucha contra el populismo: el caso de Chile, 2006
- La enseñanza de economía y administración en las instituciones de educación superior, 2006
- Private solutions to public problems, editor, The Center for International Private Enterprise (USA), 1991
- Las tareas de hoy: políticas sociales y económicas para una sociedad libre, editor, published by Zigzag, 1994
- Chile 2010: El desafío del desarrollo, editor, Libertad y Desarrollo, 2001
- Una reflexión sobre la reforma previsional, 2003
- La Huella de Miguel Kast 30 años después, 2003
- Políticas públicas para el desarrollo, 2003
- Ideas para una educación de calidad, 2002
- El Gobierno de las personas: políticas para el Gobierno Local, editor, published by Libertad y Desarrollo, 1998
- Fomento a la innovación tecnológica: El caso chileno, 1998
- Endeudamiento interno: orígenes, soluciones y perspectivas, 1987
- Reflexiones en torno al estado empresario en Chile, 1984
