= Luis Escobar Cerda =

Chilean economist and politician (1927–2024)

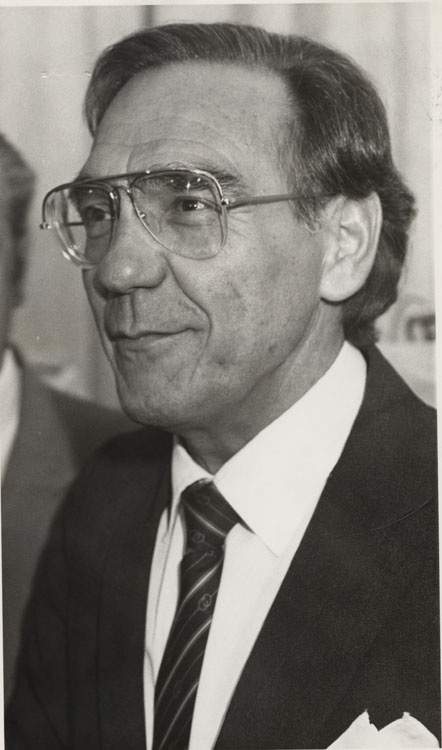
- Escobar in 1984

Minister of Finance
- In office 22 April 1984 – 12 February 1985
- President: Augusto Pinochet
- Preceded by: Carlos Cáceres Contreras
- Succeeded by: Hernán Büchi

Minister of the Economy, Development and Reconstruction
- In office 26 August 1961 – 26 September 1963
- President: Jorge Alessandri
- Preceded by: Julio Philippi Izquierdo
- Succeeded by: Julio Philippi Izquierdo

Personal details
- Born: 10 February 1927 Santiago, Chile
- Died: 24 August 2024 (aged 97) Santiago, Chile
- Party: Independent (since 1970)
- Other political affiliations: Radical Party of Chile (before 1970)
- Spouse(s): María Inés Fritzsche; Helga Koch (second wife)
- Children: 5
- Education: University of Chile; Harvard University
- Profession: Economist; Businessman; Academic

Luis Escobar Cerda (10 February 1927 – 24 August 2024) was a Chilean economist, academic, businessman, and consultant. He served as Minister of the Economy, Development and Reconstruction from 1961 to 1963 under President Jorge Alessandri, where he led the reconstruction of Valdivia following the city's destruction in the 1960 Valdivia earthquake. He later became Minister of Finance from 1984 until 1985 during the military dictatorship of Augusto Pinochet.

Cerda also served as the dean of the department of economics at the University of Chile from 1955 until 1964. He was a member of the Radical Party of Chile until 1970, when he left the party and became a political independent.

In an interview with the El Mercurio newspaper, his son, Luis Eduardo Escobar, stated that his father "always considered himself a social democrat, although his two positions were from right-wing governments [Alessandri and Pinochet]."

Escobar died in Santiago on 24 August 2024, at the age of 97.
