= Carlos Cáceres Contreras =

Chilean economist

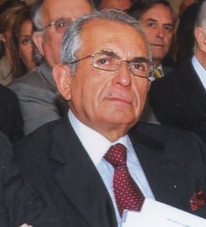

Minister of the Interior
- In office 21 October 1988 – 11 March 1990
- President: Augusto Pinochet
- Preceded by: Sergio Fernández Fernández
- Succeeded by: Enrique Krauss

Minister of Finance
- In office 14 February 1983 – 22 April 1984
- President: Augusto Pinochet
- Preceded by: Rolf Lüders
- Succeeded by: Luis Escobar Cerda

President of the Central Bank of Chile
- In office 3 September 1982 – 3 February 1983
- President: Augusto Pinochet
- Preceded by: Miguel Kast
- Succeeded by: Hernán Felipe Errázuriz

Personal details
- Born: 7 October 1940 (age 85) Valparaíso, Chile
- Education: Pontifical Catholic University of Valparaíso (BA); Cornell University (MBA); Harvard University (Ph.D)
- Profession: Economist

Carlos Francisco Cáceres Contreras (born 7 October 1940, Valparaíso) is a Chilean economist, academic, businessman, and politician who served as a Minister of State —holding the portfolios of Finance (1983–1984) and Interior (1988–1990)— as well as president of the Central Bank of Chile (1982–1983), all during the military dictatorship of Chile headed by Augusto Pinochet.

== Family and education ==
He was born in the Chilean city of Valparaíso on 7 October 1940. He completed his primary and secondary studies at the Colegio de los Padres Franceses in Valparaíso. He then pursued higher education at the Business School of the Adolfo Ibáñez Foundation at the Pontifical Catholic University of Valparaíso, earning a degree in business administration.

He later completed a Master of Business Administration (MBA) at Cornell University, followed by postgraduate studies at Harvard University in the United States.

He married Inés Solórzano, with whom he had six children.

== Political career ==
In 1976, under the framework of the military dictatorship, he was appointed by General Augusto Pinochet, president of the Military Junta, as a member of the Council of State. On 3 September 1982 he became president of the Central Bank of Chile, a post he held until 3 February 1983.

Eleven days later he was appointed Minister of Finance, serving until 22 April 1984.

During his tenure at the Ministry of Finance, his policies included the renegotiation of domestic and foreign debt, raising tariffs from 10% to 20%, adjusting the exchange rate according to domestic inflation, a special program for the sale of state-owned housing stock, and an increase in the gasoline tax.

After the regime’s defeat in the 1988 Chilean national plebiscite, he returned to the cabinet on 21 October 1988, being appointed Minister of the Interior, a position he held until the end of the administration on 11 March 1990.

As head of the most senior and politically significant ministry, he led negotiations between the ruling bloc and the opposition from May to June 1989, which resulted in the package of constitutional reforms submitted to the 1989 Chilean constitutional referendum held on 30 July 1989.

== Business career ==
In the private sector, he served as president of the Chilean Tobacco Company, Empresas Carozzi, Chilectra, and Empresas AASA, among others. He also replaced engineer José Yuraszeck as president of Enersis following the so-called Chispas case.

He sat on the boards of Banco HNS, Almacenes París, Invertec, Sipsa, San Jorge, Bice Vida, Empresas Torre, and Pesquera Coloso.

From mid-1991 onward, he chaired the board of the think tank Libertad y Desarrollo (LyD), a research institute linked to the Chilean right. In the late 1990s, his most notable public appearances included support for General Pinochet during his arrest in London, United Kingdom, and support for Joaquín Lavín, candidate of the Independent Democratic Union (UDI), in the 1999–2000 Chilean presidential election, in which Lavín finished second.

He has also held academic posts, serving as director of the Institute of Political Economy at the Adolfo Ibáñez University and as a lecturer at the University for Development.

=== Distinctions ===
- “Personas y Desarrollo” Award, granted during the Percade Congress 2009.
- National Award of the Colegio de Ingenieros de Chile (2009).
