= Libertad y Desarrollo =

Chilean free market think tank

Libertad y Desarollo (Liberty and Development)
- Abbreviation: LyD
- Formation: 1990
- Type: Free market public policy think tank
- Headquarters: Alcántara 498, Las Condes, Chile
- Coordinates: 33.4200°S 70.5884°W
- President: Carlos F. Cáceres
- Website: www.lyd.com/

Libertad y Desarrollo, abbreviated to LyD, is a Chilean think tank focused on liberal, free market economic studies. Founded in 1990, the think tank defines itself as a "center for studies and private research, independent of any political, religious, business, or governmental organization, that is dedicated to the analysis of public affairs promoting the values and principles of a free society". The think tank is the Chilean representative of RELIAL, the Liberal Network of Latin America (Red Liberal de America Latina). The center is divided into 7 programs: Economic Program, Social Program, Society and Politics Program, Legislative Program, Environmental Program, and the Justice Program. The group's goal is to respond to these various issues with a liberal, free market perspective and to make public policy recommendations specific to Chile for legislators, but not to participate in government directly. Economists Hernan Büchi, Luis Larraín, Cristián Larroulet are affiliated with the think tank.

LyD became involved the public discussion and policy recommendations regarding education reforms during the 2011 protests in Chile, testifying before the Senate's Education Commission.

According to the 2014 Global Go To Think Tank Index Report (Think Tanks and Civil Societies Program, University of Pennsylvania), LyD is ranked number 97 (of 100) in the "Top Think Tanks Worldwide (non-U.S.)", number 53 (of 150) in the "Top Think Tanks Worldwide (U.S. and non-U.S.)", and number 29 (of 50) in the "Best Think Tanks in Central and South America.

== See also ==
- Libertarianism
