= José Miguel Barros =

Chilean lawyer and diplomat (1924–2020)

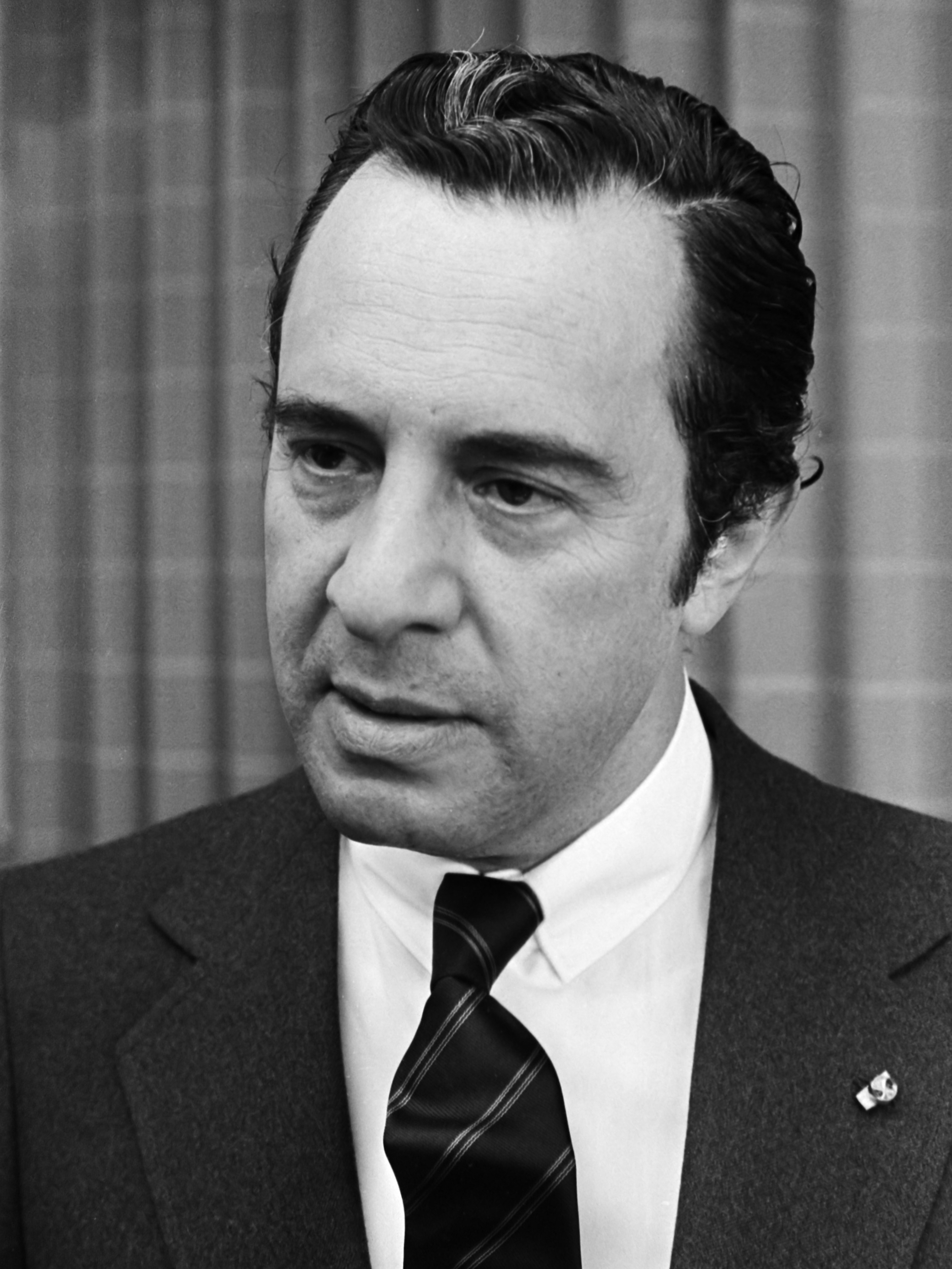

Ambassador of Chile to France
- In office June 29, 1990 – May 25, 1994
- Preceded by: Juan José Fernández Valdés
- Succeeded by: José Manuel Morales Tallar

Ambassador of Chile to Peru
- In office 1981–1983
- Preceded by: Francisco Bulnes
- Succeeded by: Juan José Fernández Valdés

Ambassador of Chile to the United States
- In office April 14, 1978 – April 23, 1981
- Preceded by: Jorge Cauas
- Succeeded by: Carlos de Costa Nora

Ambassador of Chile to the Netherlands
- In office 1976–1978

Personal details
- Born: August 7, 1924 San Fernando, Chile
- Died: February 2, 2020 (aged 95) Santiago, Chile
- Education: University of Chile
- Awards: See relevant section

José Miguel Barros Franco (San Fernando, August 7, 1924 — Santiago, February 2, 2020) was a Chilean lawyer, diplomat, historian and academic.

== Early life ==
He studied in San Fernando, in the south-central area of the country. After the death of his father, he received a scholarship to the Barros Arana National Boarding School in Santiago to study humanities, where, once graduated, he worked as inspector.

He studied law at the University of Chile, obtaining his bachelor's degree and law degree from the Supreme Court in 1951. He later completed postgraduate studies at Georgetown University in the United States, and The Hague Academy of International Law.

In 1961 he married the Dutch baroness Elna van Hovell Tot Westerflier with whom he had three sons and a daughter.

== Career ==
In 1945 he joined the Ministry of Foreign Affairs. Since 1950 he worked in various representations of the country, highlighting his role as ambassador to the Netherlands (1976–1978), the United States (1978–1981), Peru (1981–1983) and France (1990–1994), the first three during the military dictatorship led by Augusto Pinochet.

He was ambassador on Special Mission in London, acting as Agent of Chile, for the arbitration relating to the Palena River region (1965–1967) and ambassador on Special Mission in London and Geneva, acting as Agent of Chile, for arbitration related to the Beagle Channel (1971–1978).

In 2009 he was elected president of the Chilean Academy of History of the Institute of Chile, an entity which he had joined in 1977. He taught classes at the universities of Chile and Diego Portales.

In 2014 he was summoned by the second Government of Michelle Bachelet to join the advisory committee for Bolivia's lawsuit before the International Court of Justice regarding the maritime negotiation between both countries.

== Awards ==
- Officer of the Legion of Honour (1964)
- Commander of the Order of the Dannebrog (1970)
- Grand Cross of the Order of Orange-Nassau (1978)
- Order of the Sun of Peru (1983)
- Grand Cross of the Ordre national du Mérite (1994)
