= Jornadas de Protesta Nacional =

Protests against the dictatorship of Chile

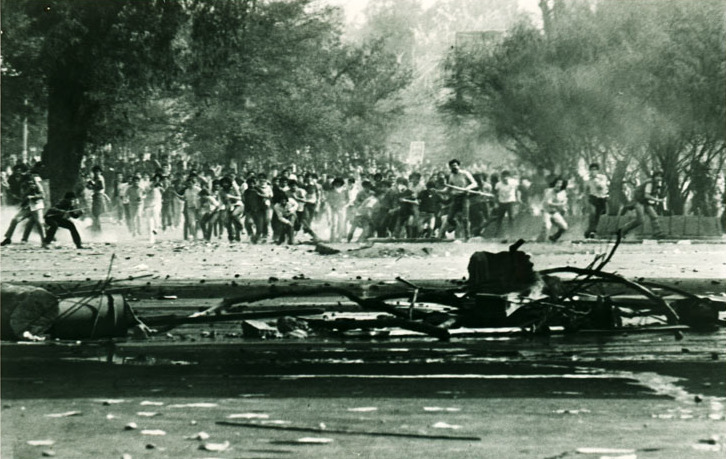
- Protests in O'Higgins Park (May 1, 1984)
- Date: 1983–1986
- Location: Chile
- Caused by: Dictatorship of Augusto Pinochet

Casualties
- Deaths: 101
- Injuries: 200+
- Arrested: 1000+

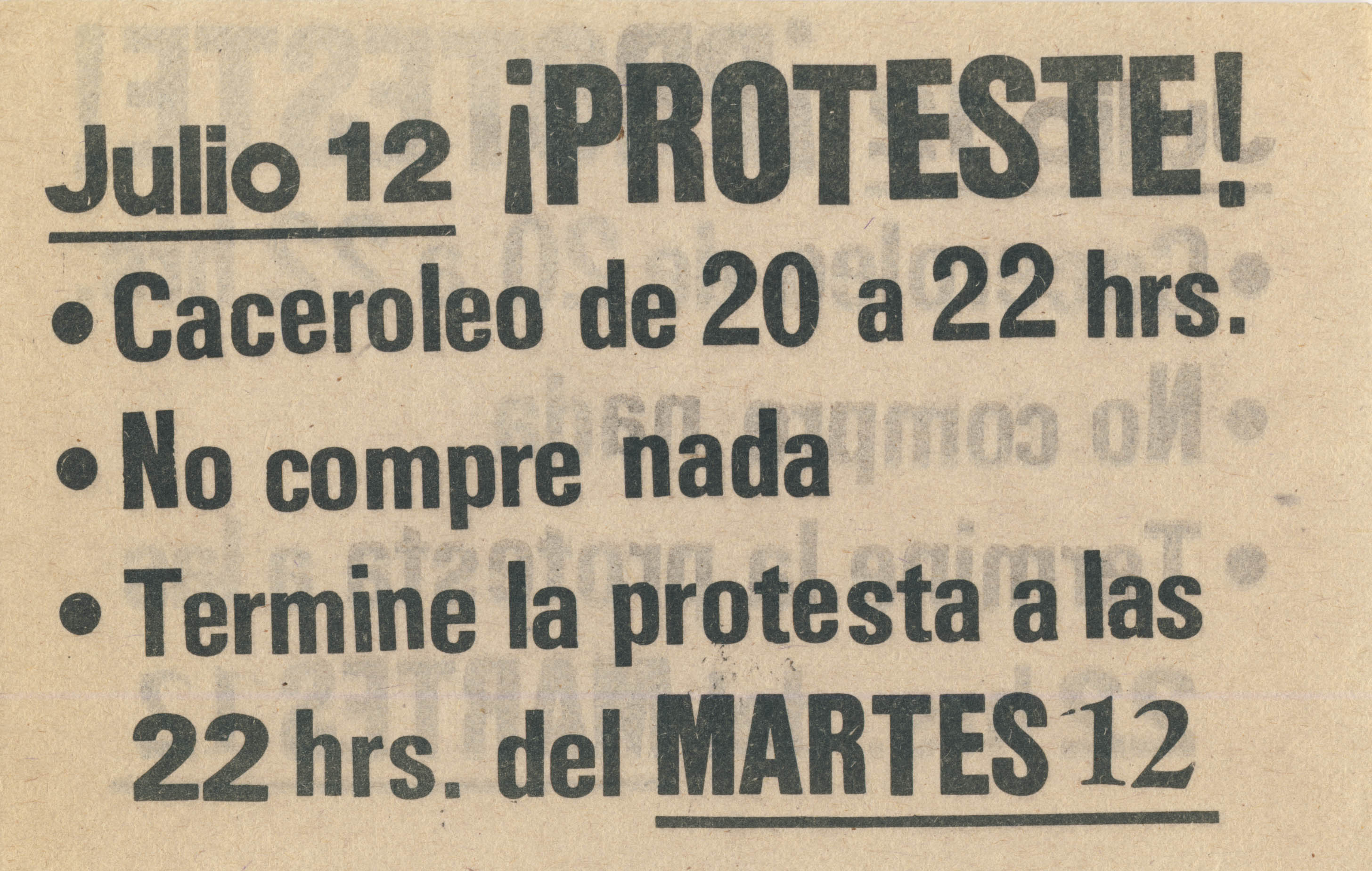
Pamphlet calling for a protest including a cacerolazo (a banging of pots and pans) in 1983

Jornadas de Protesta Nacional (lit. Days of National Protest) were a series of massive protests against the military dictatorship of Chile. The May 1983 protest was initially called by copper miners in northern Chile but grew to encompass large sectors of civil society. According to historians Gabriel Salazar and Julio Pinto it was the economic crisis of 1982 that triggered people to protests despite the severe repression of the Pinochet regime.
