= Hernán Büchi =

Chilean politician (born 1949)

Hernán Büchi Buc
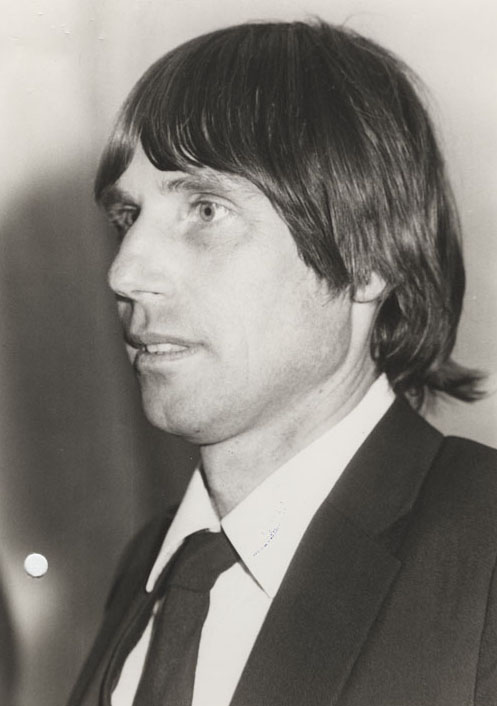

Minister of Finance
- In office 12 February 1985 – 5 April 1989
- President: Augusto Pinochet
- Preceded by: Luis Escobar Cerda
- Succeeded by: Enrique Seguel

Minister of the Office of National Planning
- In office 10 August 1983 – 8 May 1984
- President: Augusto Pinochet
- Preceded by: Sergio Pérez Hormazábal
- Succeeded by: Luis Figueroa del Río

Personal details
- Born: Hernán Alberto Büchi Buc; 6 March 1949 (age 77) Iquique, Chile
- Party: Independent Democratic Union (1987-present)

Hernán Alberto Büchi Buc (Latin American Spanish: [eɾˈnan alˈβeɾto ˈβixi ˈβuk]; born March 6, 1949) is a Chilean economist who served as minister of finance of the Military government of Chile (1973–90). In 1989 he ran unsuccessfully for president with support of Chilean right-wing parties.

== Early life ==
Büchi was born into a Roman Catholic family of Swiss, German and Croatian descent who settled in Iquique. He studied at Instituto Nacional General José Miguel Carrera of Santiago. After receiving a diploma in mining at the University of Chile he went to the U.S. and earned an MBA from Columbia University in 1975. Despite this fact, he is often mentioned together with the Chicago Boys who studied economics at the University of Chicago, because he represents similar neoliberal market positions.

In 1975, Hernán Büchi began as a consultant of the Secretary of Economics, Pablo Baraona, and as a chair of the board of directors of the state-owned sugar refiner Industria Azucarera Nacional. In 1978, he joined the board of the state-owned telephone company Compañía de Teléfonos.

== Career under Pinochet ==
In 1979 he became Vice-Secretary of Economics (1979–1980) for the ministry of treasury. He worked with the Minister for Labor and Social Security José Piñera, who started the private pension system in Chile. In 1981 he was appointed Vice-Secretary of Health (1980–1983) where he prepared the privatization of health insurance. During the 1983 / 1984 recession in Chile he became Minister of Planning (1983–1984) (ODEPLAN) and Superintendent of Banks and Financial Institutions (1984–1985). He was Minister of Finance (the Treasury) between 1985 and 1989 and returned to the principles of monetarism. Büchi's appointment as finance minister, according to British historian Edwin Williamson:

...marked the beginning of economic recovery. Büchi's strategy was to create the financial conditions for stable, export-led growth and to reorganize the productive structures of the export sector. Control of public spending, periodic devaluations, and incentives for domestic savings, foreign investment and the repatriation of capital gradually brought inflation down to 12 per cent by 1989, the lowest rate in Latin America. A vigorous campaign to sell parcels of the public debt to private investors in exchange for shares in Chilean industries reduced the nation's debt burden by over $4 billion...Economic growth averaged between 5 per cent and 6 per cent in 1985-8, the highest rate in the region.

After Pinochet stepped down in 1990, Büchi founded the "Liberty and Development Institute" (Libertad y Desarrollo), where he currently is the chairman of the "International Economy Center Council" and a consultant. It has been funded by The Tinker Foundation, Atlas Economic Research Foundation, Center for International Private Enterprise, and the German Hanns Seidel Foundation per its website. Since 1990 he has been an adviser in several government bodies in Latin America, Eastern Europe and Asia. He has been a chairman and/or member of the board of several public companies.

== Presidential Candidate (1989) ==
During the 1989 Chilean presidential election Büchi stood for the right-wing Democracy and Progress Party and Unión Demócrata Independiente but was also supported by Renovación Nacional and Democracia Radical. Büchi's campaign hired a former public relations adviser to former British Prime Minister Margaret Thatcher, Timothy Bell. Büchi came in second with 2,051,975 votes (29.40%) after Patricio Aylwin with 55.2%. However he "received more support from women than men in 59 of the 60 electoral districts, the exception being in southernmost district of Magallanes, where his support was about equal between the sexes".

== 1994 until present ==
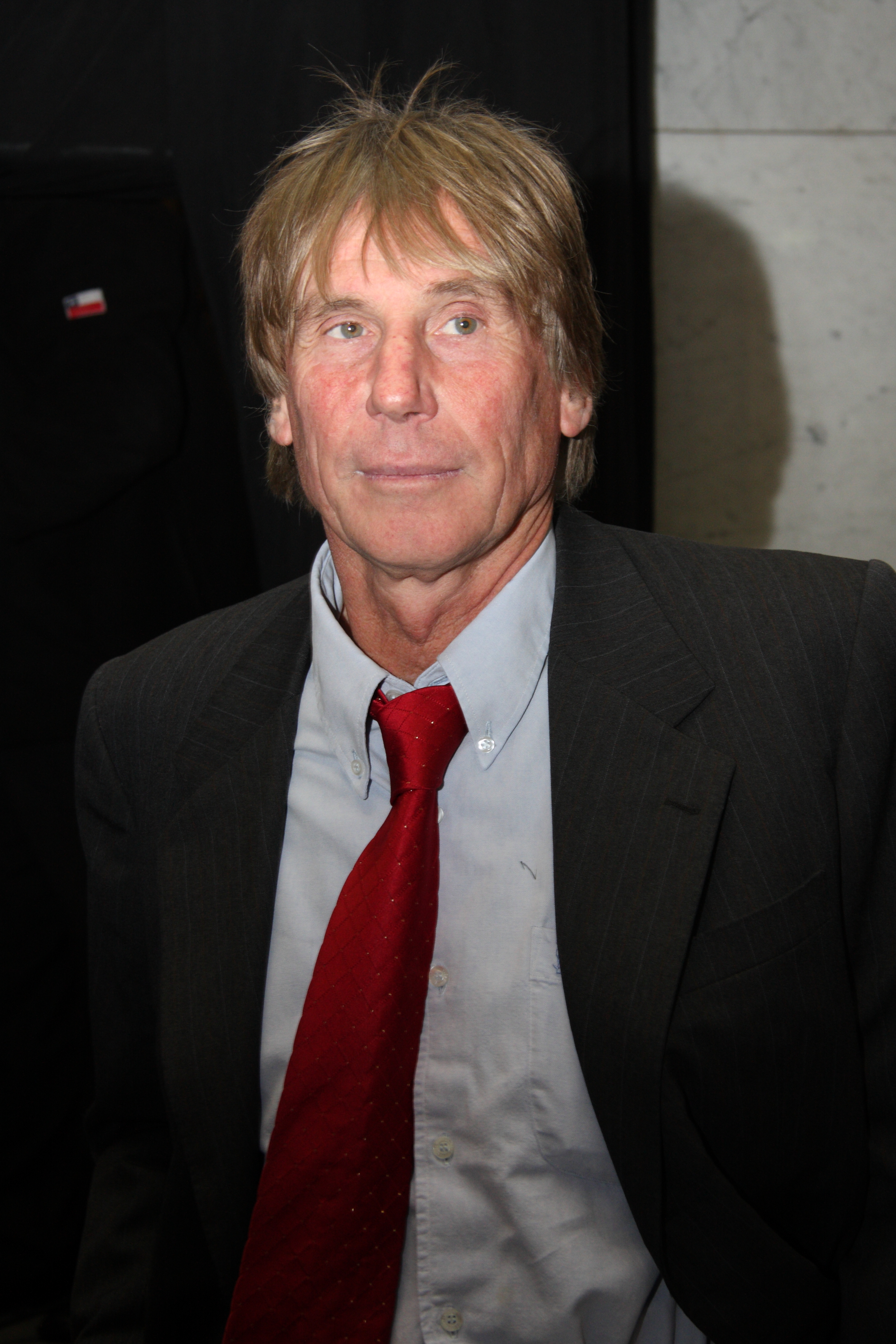
Büchi Buc in 2011, at the library of the National Congress of Chile

Since 1994 Büchi has been the chair of the board of directors the Chilean food company Lucchetti, which was owned by the late Andrónico Luksic and his Luksic group, Chile's first multinational corporation, where Büchi holds further positions. Lucchetti was acquired by Tresmontes, and Tresmontes Lucchetti S.A. was bought by Grupo Nutresa S.A. in October 2013.

Büchi has also been chair of the board of directors of the Chilean Mining Company, an advisor to the board of directors of Banco de Chile since 2008, with an annual compensation of 79,900,000 CLP (2014 USD 143,000), a chairman of the Directive Council of Universidad del Desarrollo, and Adviser to the Instituto Libertad y Desarrollo.

He has acted as member of the board of directors of the large holding company Quiñenco S.A. and Consorcio Nacional de Seguros, which is a large Chilean insurance company, and Falabella S.A.

== Books ==
In 1993, Büchi detailed his experience as Minister of the Treasury of Chile during 1985–1989, in a book called "The Economic Transformation of Chile: A Personal Account", where he discusses the liberalization of the Chilean economy, and the role he played in it. It was translated into English in 2009.

== See also ==
- Crisis of 1982
- El ladrillo
- Sergio de Castro (economist)
- Chicago Boys

== Notes ==
Political offices
Preceded by Luis Escobar Cerda	Minister of Finance; 1985–1989	Succeeded by Enrique Seguel Morel
