= Rolf Lüders =

Chilean economist

Minister of Finance
- In office August 30, 1982 – February 14, 1983
- Preceded by: Sergio de la Cuadra
- Succeeded by: Carlos Cáceres

Personal details
- Born: Rolf Lüders Schwarzenberg; October 1, 1935 (age 91) Santiago de Chile
- Education: Universidad Católica de Chile; University of Chicago
- Occupation: Economist

Rolf Lüders Schwarzenberg (born October 1, 1935 in Santiago) is a Chilean economist, entrepreneur, scholar, politician, and former Minister of State. He is son of Jürgen Lüders, leading mountaineer of the Club Alemán Andino (German Andean Club).

Lüders is a member of the Chicago Boys.

== Education ==
Lüders studied at the Universidad Católica. He graduated in Commercial Engineering in 1958 and received the Hamel Prize awarded to the best Commercial Engineer that graduated in Chile that year.

He then went to the University of Chicago for graduate studies: MBA, MA in Economics, and ultimately a PhD in Economics (1968) with a thesis on Chile’s monetary history. Milton Friedman was Lüders' thesis advisor.

== Career ==
As a member of the Chicago Boys, he took part in the economic direction of Chile during the Augusto Pinochet government. Before assuming as Minister of Economy in 1982, he had worked for the Vial Group, one of the most powerful economic groups of the time in Chile, managing the Banco de Chile for that group, while being Banco Hipotecario de Chile's vice president of the Board until August 1982. However, as Minister of Economy, he had to supervise the takeover of the Bank of Chile, after the breakdown and liquidation of Grupo Vial during the economic crisis of 1981–1982.

== Political career ==
He was Minister of Finance and Economy, Development and Reconstruction in the period (1982-1983).
