= IANSA (company) =

Chilean sugar producer

- Industry: Manufacturing
- Founded: 1953
- Headquarters: Santiago, Chile.
- Products: Sugar, juices, animal food
- Website: www.iansa.cl

IANSA (from Industria Azucarera Nacional) is a Chilean sugar grower, refiner, and manufacturer of sweeteners and sugar products. It also produces fruit juices, tomato paste, and pet and animal food.

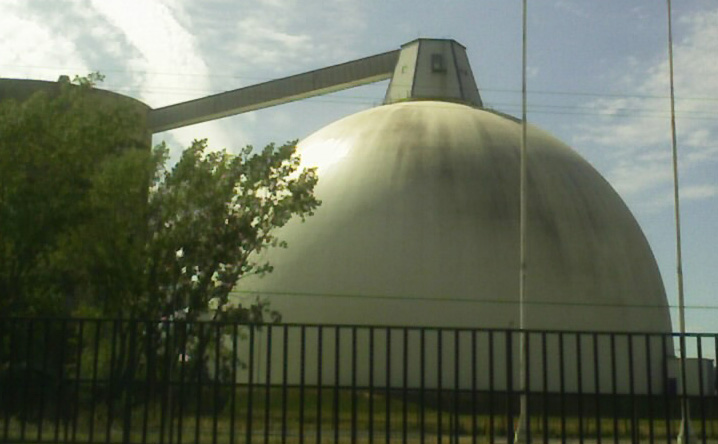
Iansa Company

IANSA was founded in 1953 as a government-run CORFO. It was pushed to privatize under the economic policies of dictator Augusto Pinochet. After the Crisis of 1982, the company went bankrupt, but continued its privatization, which was completed by 1988.

In September 2015, the English ED&F Man bought 100% of IANSA, but the following year it was seen to be in crisis, since it generated "barely 51 million" US dollars, "compared to a profit of more than US$4,000 million for the last year". Hence, in 2017, ED&F Man announced a five-year plan to reorganize and restructure its businesses. Which did not prevent Iansa from going from profit to loss that year.

IANSA informed in July 2018, of its decision to close the Linares plant. The government, a few days later, asked Iansa to postpone this decision for two years, according to the Minister of Agriculture Antonio Walker. Finally, the business board decided to close the plant in August 2018.

In September 2020, Empresas Iansa decided to concentrate national sugar production at its production plant in San Carlos, which implies ceasing production at the Los Angeles plant as of the 2021 season. The San Carlos plant will thus become the nerve center of production and distribution in the southern zone. As of 2020, sugar production is one of its main businesses, representing around 50% of revenue.
