= Crisis of 1982 =

Economic crisis in Chile

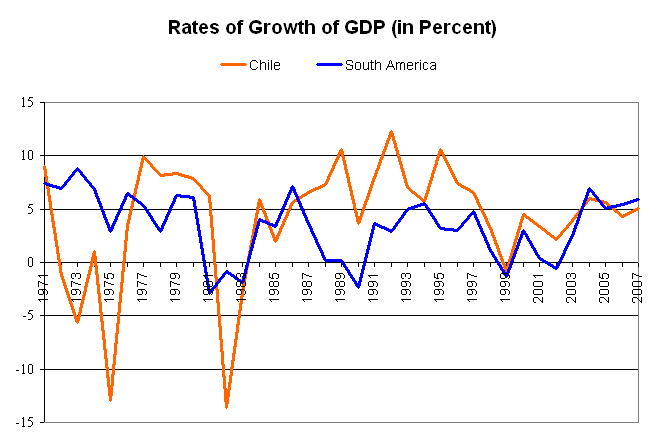
Growth rate of Chile's GDP (orange) and Latin America (blue) between 1971 and 2007

The Crisis of 1982 was a major economic crisis suffered in Chile during the military government of Chile (1973–1990). Chile's GDP fell 14.3%, and unemployment rose to 23.7%.

== Background ==
After the socialist reorientation of the economy during the presidency of Salvador Allende, economic sabotage by the Nixon presidency, and the subsequent Chilean economic crisis which reached its zenith during 1973, the Chilean Armed Forces carried up a coup d'état which deposed Allende's Popular Unity government, evicted and demobilised resistance of armed movements close to Allende like the Revolutionary Left Movement, and installed a Military Junta, presided by General Augusto Pinochet. The new regime proceeded with the dissolution of the National Congress, the establishment of censorship, suspension of civil rights and the arrest of civilians (the majority sympathizers of the overthrown government and some linked to moderate leftism) . Upon taking over power, the military junta under the command of General Pinochet set out to implement a series of neo-liberal economic policies based on the Chicago school of economics. In 1973, only a little bit over two years of regulatory policies established by Allende, the military junta decided to reform the economy, and the Chicago boys were permitted to implement some of the neoliberal economical policies outlined in El ladrillo. In 1979 however, Chile decided to depart from the principle of free floating exchange rates, with disastrous results. From 1976 onwards import tariffs decreased strongly impacting negatively the Chilean production aimed for the internal market.

== Boom and burst ==
The 1982 crisis has been traced to the overvalued Chilean peso, which had been helped by being pegged to the US dollar, and to the high interest rates in Chile, which would have hampered investment in productive activities. In fact, from 1979 to 1982, much of the spending in Chile was the consumption of goods and services. Foreign loans given to Chilean companies started to decline in late 1981 reaching the point of becoming negligible one year later. Events can also be explained in terms of interest rates and capital flows using the nineteenth-century Banking School theory of financial crises. By 1982, Chile's external debt had risen to over 17 billion dollars. Income per capita in Chile fell in 1983 to levels below those of 1960. Incomes fell as salaries were not adjusted for inflation. Around half a million persons were on employment programmes.

In agriculture, the entrance of speculative capital before the crisis led to the bankruptcy of several processing companies. IANSA, a sugar company that had belonged to the state before its privatization, went bankrupt because of a short-term gains policy by its new owners.

The government response to the crisis priorized the preservation of the international markets over the placation of internal unrest.

=== Bank interventions ===
In November 1981, banks were bailed out by the government after they had taken excessive risks: the large Banco de Talca and Banco Español Chile and the small Banco de Linares and Banco de Fomento de Valparaíso. Financial societies (Compañía General, Cash, Capitales and del Sur) were also bailed out. Banco de Talca and Banco Español Chile were nationalized, removing the management and wresting ownership from shareholders (they were later privatized again).

On January 13, 1983, the government made a massive bank intervention, bailing out five banks and dissolving three others.

=== Agriculture contraction ===
All sectors of Chilean agriculture except fruit exports and forestry contracted during the crisis, but recovery was fast after 1984. The number of farm bankruptcies in Chile increased from 1979 to its 1983 peak.

== Aftermath ==
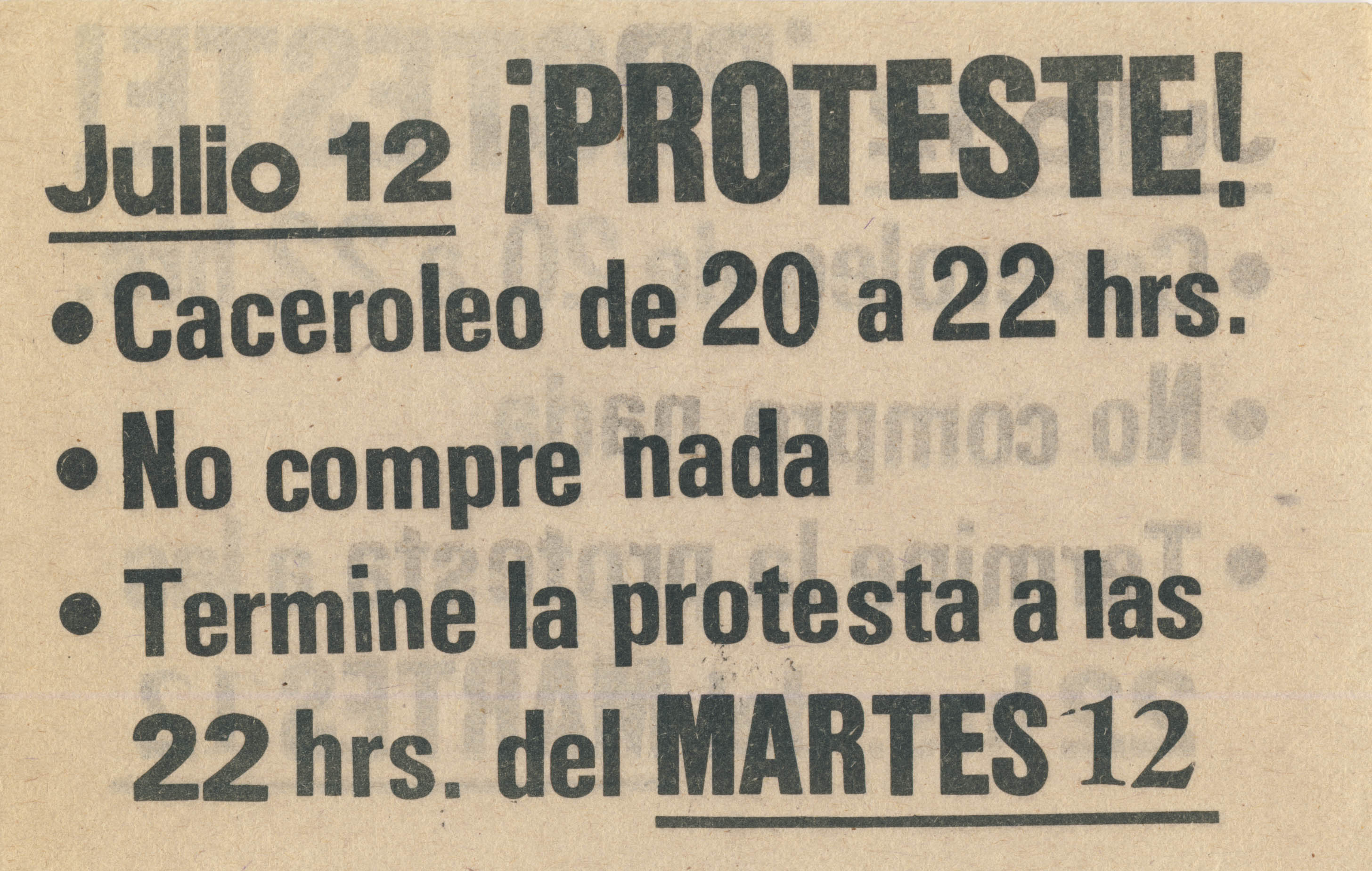
Pamphlet calling for a protest including a cacerolazo (a banging of pots and pans) in 1983

The crisis has been credited of beginning, despite its severe repression, a wave of protest all over Chile against the dictatorship.

In the years after the crisis, the economic policy of the dictatorship changed to include price bands for some foodstuffs and a floating exchange rate.

== Academic debate ==
Supporters of the neoliberal policy of the military dictatorship have argued that the crisis started outside Chile and hit the whole of Latin America in the so-called La Década Perdida (The Lost Decade). Historians Gabriel Salazar and Julio Pinto have countered that the type of crisis is a frequently inherent weakness of the neoliberal model. In contrast, economist Milton Friedman blamed precisely the country's departure from the neoliberal model and political interventions in matters such as the Chilean peso.

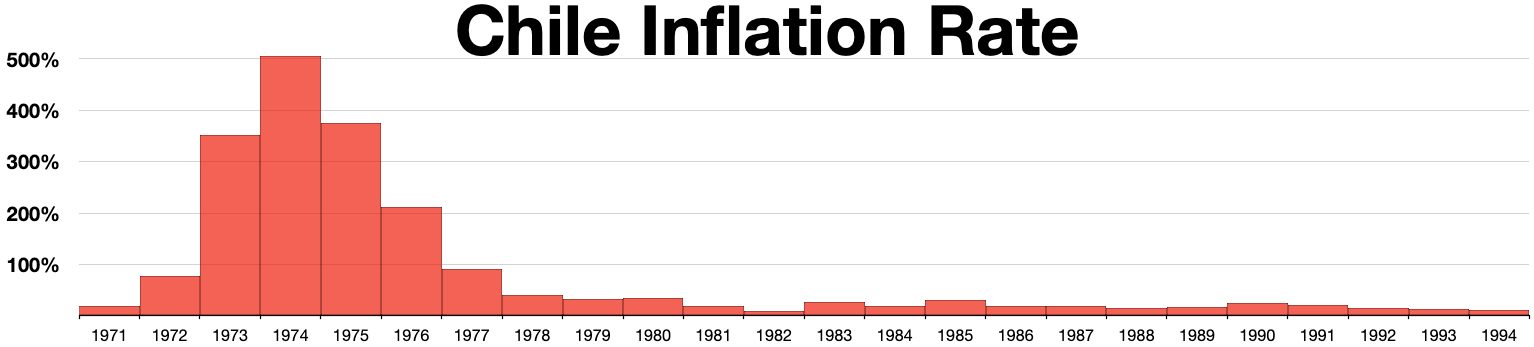
Chile inflation rate 1971-1994

According to Ricardo Ffrench-Davis, the "unnecessary" radicalism of the shock therapy in the 1970s caused mass unemployment, loss of purchasing power, extreme inequalities in the distribution of income, and severe socioeconomic damage. He argues that the 1982 crises as well as the "success" of the pragmatic economic policy after 1982 proves that the radical economic policy of the Chicago boys harmed the Chilean economy from 1973 to 1981 though the economy of Chile recovered quickly and continued to rise rapidly over time.

== See also ==
- 1982–1985 Bolivian economic crisis
