= Jorge Cauas =

Chilean politician and diplomat (1934–2023)

- Cauas in March 2009

Ambassador of Chile to the United States
- In office 23 March 1977 – 1978
- President: Augusto Pinochet
- Preceded by: Manuel Trucco Gaete
- Succeeded by: José Miguel Barros

Minister of Finance
- In office 11 July 1974 – 31 December 1976
- President: Augusto Pinochet
- Preceded by: Lorenzo Gotuzzo
- Succeeded by: Sergio de Castro

Personal details
- Born: 13 August 1934 San Felipe, Chile
- Died: 22 December 2023 (aged 89)
- Party: Christian Democratic Party (until 1974)
- Spouse: Rosario Montero Sánchez
- Children: 2
- Education: University of Chile; Columbia University
- Occupation: Civil engineer, Economist, academic, consultant, and public official

Jorge Elías Cauas Lama (13 August 1934 – 22 December 2023) was a Chilean engineer, economist, academic and politician. He served as Minister of Finance under the military government of General Augusto Pinochet between 1974 and 1976, where he led the first stage of the regime’s economic restructuring.

Born in San Felipe, he was trained as a civil engineer at the University of Chile and earned a master’s degree in economics from Columbia University as a Fulbright scholar. A prominent member of the Christian Democratic Party during the 1960s, Cauas was part of the technical team that advised the administration of President Eduardo Frei Montalva and held leading posts at the Central Bank of Chile.

As finance minister from 1974 to 1976, he introduced the "Economic Recovery Programme," implementing a fiscal and monetary shock plan aimed at stabilising inflation and restoring fiscal balance after the fall of the Popular Unity government.

Later, between 1977 and 1978, he served as Ambassador of Chile to the United States. After leaving public office, he became an influential business executive, chairing the Banco Santiago, the Compañía de Cervecerías Unidas, AFP Provida, and Entel Chile, as well as serving on the board of the Centro de Estudios Públicos.

== Biography ==
Cauas was born in San Felipe to a Palestinian immigrant father from Bethlehem. He attended the Instituto Nacional General José Miguel Carrera in Santiago and graduated in 1958 as a civil engineer from the University of Chile. Three years later he completed a Master of Arts in Economics at Columbia University in New York City through a Fulbright Scholarship.

He joined the Christian Democratic Party and was part of the technical teams that advised President Eduardo Frei Montalva’s administration (1964–1970). Between 1967 and 1970, he served as Executive Vice-President of the Central Bank of Chile. From 1972 to 1974, he worked as Director of the Research Centre for Development at the World Bank in Washington, D.C..

== Public career ==
=== Minister of Finance ===
In July 1974, Cauas resigned from the Christian Democratic Party after accepting the post of Minister of Finance offered by the Military Junta. His letter of resignation was addressed to party president Patricio Aylwin, who accepted it the following day.

During his tenure, he implemented the "Economic Recovery Programme," which entailed a strict fiscal and monetary stabilisation plan and a major tariff reform designed to liberalise foreign trade. His policies restored the Treasury’s solvency and laid the foundations for the "Chicago Boys" economic agenda that followed. He remained in office until the end of 1976.

=== Later career and business roles ===
In 1977, he was appointed Ambassador of Chile to the United States, serving until 1978. Upon returning to Chile, he entered the private sector and became president of Banco Santiago, the Compañía de Cervecerías Unidas (CCU), AFP Provida (1981–1983), and Entel Chile (1978–1990).

Following the collapse of Banco Santiago in the early 1980s, he was appointed by General Pinochet as the presidential representative to the University of Chile’s Board of Governors (1984) and later to the governmental Monetary Council (1985). In the late 1980s and 1990s he joined the board of the Banco de Crédito e Inversiones and the Centro de Estudios Públicos (CEP).

He remained active as a consultant and academic until his death on 22 December 2023, aged 89.
