= Sergio de Castro (economist) =

Chilean economist (1930–2024)

Sergio de Castro Spikula

Minister of Economy
- In office 14 April 1975 – 27 December 1976
- Preceded by: Fernando Léniz
- Succeeded by: Pablo Baraona

Minister of Finance
- In office 31 December 1976 – 22 April 1982
- Preceded by: Jorge Cauas
- Succeeded by: Sergio de la Cuadra

Personal details
- Born: 25 January 1930 Santiago, Chile
- Died: 26 April 2024 (aged 94)
- Party: Independent
- Education: Pontifical Catholic University of Chile; University of Chicago
- Occupation: Economist

Sergio de Castro Spikula (25 January 1930 – 26 April 2024) was a Chilean economist who served the military junta headed by Augusto Pinochet as economy and finance minister. De Castro was one of the Chicago Boys, trained in economics at the University of Chicago. Sergio de Castro is one of the authors of the influential text known as El ladrillo, writing its prologue.

De Castro died on 26 April 2024, at the age of 94.

== See also ==
- Crisis of 1982
