= El ladrillo =

1973 study about Chilean economic policies

El ladrillo (English: The Brick) is a study considered the base of many of the economic policies followed by the military dictatorship that ruled Chile from 1973 to 1990. El ladrillo was finished just a few weeks before the 1973 Chilean coup d'etat. This study became known to the public in 1992 when it was published by the Centro de Estudios Públicos, a think tank associated with the Chicago Boys, and with a prologue written by economist Sergio de Castro. Emilio Sanfuentes was the coordinator of the team of economists who researched the different topics.

== Introduction ==
El ladrillo is a collection of articles on economic policies that play a fundamental role in Chile's economic reform from 1973 to 1990. It is originated from private seminars held by a group of professional economists and scholars. From 1940 to 1969, while Chile was experiencing gradual social changes, including increasing election participation, population growth, education promotion, as well as a rise in national health levels, the country was also trapped in a dilemma of sluggish economic growth due to the low efficiency of the administration work and market mechanism. With the purpose of lifting the economy to a track of steady, faster growth, and alleviating the tensions from the suffering lower class, the new administration, controlled by Jorge Alessandri and Augusto Pinochet, supported a group of domestic professionals and economists to figure out a series of systematic economic policies.

The story of the book can be traced back to 1956, when the University of Chicago agreed to train a selected group of alumni from la Universidad Católica in the field of economics, who later became known as the Chicago boys. After graduation, they returned to Chile and set up courses for the country's most impactful entrepreneurs. This encounter between the two groups ultimately led to the economic reform of the country. Later when Jorge Alessandri became the principal candidate of the country's highest administrative officer, Sergio de Castro, Pablo Baraona and a group of scholars, along with industry elites, started to hold regular private seminars to debate and discuss the country's dilemma as well as respective solutions in various critical sectors of the economy.

They aimed to convince the administration of the progressive ideas, whose goal it was to help the country out of economic stagnation and build long-term steady, strong growth later on. More specifically, the goals include the opening of the economy, the elimination of monopolies, the liberation of the price system, the modification of the current tax system for a more neutral, fair and efficient one, the creation and formation of a capital market, the generation of a new pension system, the normalization of the national agricultural activities, and the protection of property rights, etc. Besides, one feature of this collection that cannot be ignored is that under the support of the military regime, it put great emphasis on the coordination and coherence of policies in various sectors of the economy and made no compromise with a gentle and gradual reform.

== Content ==
=== 1. Diagnosis of the Country's Situation ===
From 1940 to 1970, Chile experienced a severe economic stagnation. Based on the utopian Marxist blueprint, the country took over huge monopolies and latifundia, redistributed the income to other parts of the society, and controlled the market price along with the interest rate. This plan slowed or reversed economic growth and caused other economic problems as well.

One conspicuous characteristic of the country during that period was the centralization of authority. State power, and its abuse, permeated almost every aspect of society. The intention of using government intervention to resolve economic problems resulted in reverse consequences and distorted the economy to one that was highly dependent on administrative control. The control over market prices and interest rates led to distorted concentration of productive resources in the informal black market and shortage of capital. The industrial protectionism policy, with the purpose of substituting importation, created space for huge state-owned monopolies. However, under this trade policy, Chile still imported huge amounts of agricultural products due to prolonged stagnation in its agricultural production and an increasing population size. These combined to crowd out the capital that could have been invested in high-technology manufacturing facilities and other factors that were critical to economic development. Trapped in this dilemma, Chilean companies survived by lobbying the government for favors and loopholes.

Another aspect of the stagnating economy was the high unemployment rate. Many young people could not find jobs. Behind the phenomenon was the invisibly high labor cost that is related to social insurance, pension reserves and regulated immobility in the labor market. Besides, as the consequence of the government-intervention-oriented policy applied to poverty alleviation, the poor farmers became even more impoverished since the price of agricultural products (food) was restrained to a low level for both rich and poor. Therefore, such a policy essentially sacrificed the interests of the poor for those of the rich. What is even worse was that the poverty alleviation policy based on the government's redistribution of income induced people into the mindset that individual efforts were of little use in comparison with government intervention. The inflation induced by the centralized economic plan also exacerbated the conflicts between capitalists and workers because of the diminishing purchase power of salaries.

The highly centralized system crushed economic development and fomented social conflict. It was this fundamental failure that opened the door to radical economic reform in the following years.

=== 2. Specific Policies ===
==== 2.1 The policy to decentralize state planning ====
As the country has a monarchical tradition, Chilean people used to severely depend on state laws and regulations to resolve problems. However, such an atmosphere does not benefit economic development because individual efforts were ignored and the government faced huge information cost to enact concrete policies for different production sectors. Therefore, the policy aims to define the border of the administrative power and give production sectors full autonomy of management. The market's role to allocate resources is emphasized and governments are only suggested to provide a proper global planning for the economy. Besides, development of intermediary agencies and simplification of the judiciary are also encouraged to reduce both the administrative and transaction costs.

==== 2.2 Looser policy for foreign trade ====
The past foreign trade policy to restrict flow of production resources to the exportation sector actually led to degradation of agricultural production and loss of opportunity to enter the global market. To resolve such problems, a policy lift restrictions on exchange rate is needed to activate the exportation. Moreover, it is also important to maintain a certain amount of foreign exchange reserves to stabilize people's expectations, thereby stimulating investment in export industries. Other measures, including replacing the import ban with tariffs and consumption taxes, providing subsidies, and long- and short-term loans to exporters to resist the strong foreign competitors at first, are also needed to establish a mechanism to encourage exportation.

==== 2.3 Price policy ====
Another important aspect of the reform is to lift the unreasonable controls on price. On the other hand, as a transitional policy, a price protection on critical industries is needed to implement the transformation. After the transitional period, an efficient price control in monopolistic industries should be implemented. Also, it is important to decompose monopoly companies, especially the state-owned monopoly companies, thereby promoting market competition.

==== 2.4 Fiscal and monetary policy ====
The monetary policy should ensure proper currency liquidity, which is conducive to commodity transactions, and have stabilizing prices, full employment, and maintaining high economic growth as its aims. On the other hand, a good policy should well control the fiscal deficit, especially the deficit of state-owned enterprises, so as to prevent inflation. While inflation is aimed to be controlled, a proper increase in price should be allowed to offset the loss of firms. Furthermore, to reduce fiscal expenditure, it is recommended to moderate the salary for the public sectors, and reduce financial support for state-owned enterprises. Also, establishing new standardized taxes and seeking external loans are suggested to relieve inflationary pressures.

==== 2.5 Other policies ====
Other policies include building a free capital market, privatizing the system of provision, social security, and public health, etc. While the reform encompasses multiple dimensions, the most important thing, according to the suggestions, is to implement the most radical and thorough reforms from the start so as to stabilize people's expectations and strengthen their confidence in the reform.
