= July 2 =

July 2 this year in various calendars
- Thursday, 2 July 2026
Akan	Kwayaw
Armenian	17 Hrotich 1475
Aztec	Tepeilhuitl 13, 5 Cipactli
Babylonian	16 Simanu, 2337 SE
Balinese pawukon	Menga, Beteng, Jaya, Keliwon, Was, Wraspati of Langkir, Kala, Ogan, Manusa
Bengali	18 Asharh, BS 1433
Chinese	Yin Fire Ox・Dipper Mansion; Fire Horse Year, Month 5, Day 18 (Xiazhi, 5 days until Xiaoshu)
Common Era	2 July 2026 CE
Coptic	25 Paoni, AM 1742
Egyptian	17 Athyr, 2775 NE
Ethiopian	25 Sanē, 2018 Amätä Məhrät
French Republican	Décade II, Quartidi de Messidor de l'Année 234 de la République
Gregorian	2 July, AD 2026
Hebrew	17 Tamuz, AM 5786
Hindu	Uttarāṣāḍha・Vaidhṛti; Solar: 18 Āṣāḍha, 1948 SE; Lunisolar: Dvitīyā, Kṛishna pakṣa of Jyeṣṭha, 2083 VE; Rāudra・5127 KY・1,872,758
Icelandic	Fimmtudagur, 11 Sólmánuður 2026
Islamic	16 Muharram, AH 1448 (using tabular method)
ISO week date	2026-W27-4
Japanese	18 Satsuki, Reiwa 8 (Geshi, 5 days until Shōsho)
Julian	19 June, AD 2026 (AM 7534)
Julian day	2461224
Korean	18 Maldal, 4359 DE
Maya	13.0.13.13.1; 14 Tzec, 5 Imix
Roman	ante diem XIII Kalendas Iulias, MMDCCLXXIX AUC
Solar Hijri	11 Tir, SH 1405
Tibetan	17 lhag snron, me pho rta 2153 or 1772 or 1000

<<	July					>>
Su	Mo	Tu	We	Th	Fr	Sa
			1	2	3	4
5	6	7	8	9	10	11
12	13	14	15	16	17	18
19	20	21	22	23	24	25
26	27	28	29	30	31
2026

July 2 in recent years
2026 (Thursday)
2025 (Wednesday)
2024 (Tuesday)
2023 (Sunday)
2022 (Saturday)
2021 (Friday)
2020 (Thursday)
2019 (Tuesday)
2018 (Monday)
2017 (Sunday)

July 2 is the 183rd day of the year (184th in leap years) in the Gregorian calendar; 182 days remain until the end of the year.

This date marks the halfway point of the year. In common years, the midpoint of the year occurs at noon on this date, while in leap years, it occurs at midnight (start of the day). (Note: The offset of the midpoint from the beginning of July occurs due to the shortness of the month of February. In countries such as in most of the United States and most of Europe, where daylight savings are being observed by this date, the exact time for the midpoint of the year is 13:00 on July 2 in a common year, and 01:00 in a leap year.)

== Events ==
=== Pre-1600 ===
- AD 311 – Beginning of the papacy of Pope Miltiades.
- 626 – Li Shimin, the future Emperor Taizong of Tang, ambushes and kills his rival brothers Li Yuanji and Li Jiancheng in the Xuanwu Gate Incident.
- 866 – Battle of Brissarthe: The Franks led by Robert the Strong are defeated by a joint Breton-Viking army.
- 1298 – Battle of Göllheim: Albert I of Habsburg defeats Adolf of Nassau-Weilburg.
- 1494 – Age of Discovery: The Treaty of Tordesillas is ratified by Spain.
- 1582 – Battle of Yamazaki: Toyotomi Hideyoshi defeats Akechi Mitsuhide.

=== 1601–1900 ===
- 1644 – English Civil War: Battle of Marston Moor.
- 1645 – Wars of the Three Kingdoms: Battle of Alford.
- 1776 – American Revolution: The Continental Congress adopts the Lee Resolution severing ties with the Kingdom of Great Britain. The wording of the formal Declaration of Independence was agreed upon and publicly released two days later, on July 4.
- 1823 – Bahia Independence Day: The Siege of Salvador ends Portuguese rule in Brazil, with the final defeat of the Portuguese crown loyalists in the province of Bahia.
- 1840 – A M_{s} 7.4 earthquake strikes present-day Turkey and Armenia; combined with the effects of an eruption on Mount Ararat, kills 10,000 people.
- 1863 – American Civil War: On the second day of the Battle of Gettysburg - the Battle of Little Round Top takes place and results in a Union victory after the Confederate troops unsuccessfully try to assault the Union left flank.
- 1881 – Charles J. Guiteau shoots and fatally wounds U.S. President James A. Garfield (who will die of complications from his wounds on September 19).
- 1890 – The U.S. Congress passes the Sherman Antitrust Act.

=== 1901–present ===
- 1917 – In the leadup to the Battle of Aqaba, T. E. Lawrence and his Arab forces defeat a battalion of Ottomans at Abu al-Lissan.
- 1921 – World War I: U.S. President Warren G. Harding signs the Knox–Porter Resolution formally ending the war between the United States and Germany.
- 1934 – The Night of the Long Knives ends after three days of killings.
- 1937 – Amelia Earhart and navigator Fred Noonan are last heard from over the Pacific Ocean and disappear while attempting to make the first equatorial round-the-world flight.
- 1964 – Civil rights movement: U.S. President Lyndon B. Johnson signs the Civil Rights Act of 1964 meant to prohibit segregation in public places.
- 1966 – France conducts its first nuclear weapon test in the Pacific, on Moruroa Atoll.
- 1976 – End of South Vietnam; Communist North Vietnam annexes the former South Vietnam to form the unified Socialist Republic of Vietnam.
- 1986 – Rodrigo Rojas and Carmen Gloria Quintana are burnt alive during a street demonstration against the dictatorship of General Augusto Pinochet in Chile in the Quemados case.
- 1986 – Aeroflot Flight 2306 crashes while attempting an emergency landing at Syktyvkar Airport in Syktyvkar, in present-day Komi Republic, Russia, killing 54 people.
- 1990 – In the 1990 Mecca tunnel tragedy, 1,400 Muslim pilgrims are suffocated to death and trampled upon in a pedestrian tunnel leading to the holy city of Mecca.
- 1993 – A mob sets fire to the Hotel Madımak in Sivas, Turkey, where an Alevi cultural festival was taking place, killing 37 people.
- 1994 – USAir Flight 1016 crashes near Charlotte Douglas International Airport, killing 37 of the 57 people on board.
- 1997 – The Bank of Thailand floats the baht, triggering the Asian financial crisis.
- 2000 – Vicente Fox Quesada is elected the first President of México from an opposition party, the Partido Acción Nacional, after more than 70 years of continuous rule by the Partido Revolucionario Institucional, in the 2000 Mexican general election.
- 2005 – The Live 8 benefit concerts takes place in the G8 states and in South Africa. More than 1,000 musicians perform and are broadcast on 182 television networks and 2,000 radio networks.
- 2013 – A magnitude 6.1 earthquake strikes Aceh, Indonesia, killing at least 42 people and injuring 420 others.
- 2024 – A stampede during a religious event in Uttar Pradesh, India, leaves at least 121 people dead and 150 others injured.

== Births ==
=== Pre-1600 ===
- 419 – Valentinian III, Roman emperor (died 455)
- 1478 – Louis V, Elector Palatine (died 1544)
- 1486 – Jacopo Sansovino, Italian sculptor and architect (died 1570)
- 1489 – Thomas Cranmer, English archbishop, theologian, and Protestant martyr (died 1556)
- 1492 – Elizabeth Tudor, English daughter of Henry VII of England (died 1495)
- 1597 – Theodoor Rombouts, Flemish painter (died 1637)

=== 1601–1900 ===
- 1647 – Daniel Finch, 2nd Earl of Nottingham, English politician, Lord President of the Council (died 1730)
- 1648 – Arp Schnitger, German organ builder (died 1719)
- 1665 – Samuel Penhallow, English-American soldier and historian (died 1726)
- 1667 – Pietro Ottoboni, Italian cardinal and art collector (died 1740)
- 1714 – Christoph Willibald Gluck, German composer (died 1787)
- 1724 – Friedrich Gottlieb Klopstock, German poet and author (died 1803)
- 1797 – Francisco Javier Echeverría, Mexican businessman and politician. President of Mexico (1841) (died 1852)
- 1819 – Charles-Louis Hanon, French pianist and composer (died 1900)
- 1820 – George Law Curry, American publisher and politician, 5th governor of the Oregon Territory (died 1878)
- 1820 – Juan N. Méndez, Mexican general and interim president, 1876-1877 (died 1894)
- 1821 – Charles Tupper, Canadian physician and politician, 6th Prime Minister of Canada (died 1915)
- 1825 – Émile Ollivier, French statesman (died 1913)
- 1834 – Hendrick Peter Godfried Quack, Dutch economist and historian (died 1917)
- 1849 – Maria Theresa of Austria-Este (died 1919)
- 1862 – William Henry Bragg, English physicist, chemist, and mathematician, Nobel Prize laureate (died 1942)
- 1865 – Lily Braun, German author and publicist (died 1916)
- 1869 – Liane de Pougy, French-Swiss dancer and author (died 1950)
- 1876 – Harriet Brooks, Canadian physicist and academic (died 1933)
- 1876 – Wilhelm Cuno, German businessman and politician, Chancellor of Germany (died 1933)
- 1877 – Hermann Hesse, German-born Swiss poet, novelist, and painter, Nobel Prize laureate (died 1962)
- 1877 – Rinaldo Cuneo, American artist ("the painter of San Francisco") (died 1939)
- 1881 – Royal Hurlburt Weller, American lawyer and politician (died 1929)
- 1884 – Alfons Maria Jakob, German neurologist and author (died 1931)
- 1893 – Ralph Hancock, Welsh gardener and author (died 1950)
- 1900 – Tyrone Guthrie, English actor and director (died 1971)

=== 1901–present ===
- 1902 – K. Kanapathypillai, Sri Lankan author and academic (died 1968)
- 1903 – Alec Douglas-Home, English cricketer and politician, 66th Prime Minister of the United Kingdom (died 1995)
- 1903 – Olav V, Norwegian king, 1957–1991 (died 1991)
- 1904 – René Lacoste, French tennis player and businessman, created the polo shirt (died 1996)
- 1906 – Hans Bethe, German-American physicist and academic, Nobel Prize laureate (died 2005)
- 1906 – Károly Kárpáti, Hungarian Jewish wrestler (died 1996)
- 1906 – Séra Martin, French middle-distance runner (died 1993)
- 1908 – Thurgood Marshall, American lawyer and civil rights activist, 32nd Solicitor General of the United States, and former Associate Justice of the Supreme Court of the United States (died 1993)
- 1911 – Reg Parnell, English race car driver and manager (died 1964)
- 1913 – Max Beloff, Baron Beloff, English historian and academic (died 1999)
- 1914 – Frederick Fennell, American conductor and educator (died 2004)
- 1914 – Mário Schenberg, Brazilian physicist and engineer (died 1990)
- 1914 – Erich Topp, German admiral (died 2005)
- 1915 – Valerian Wellesley, 8th Duke of Wellington, British peer, politician and soldier (died 2014)
- 1916 – Ken Curtis, American actor and singer (died 1991)
- 1916 – Hans-Ulrich Rudel, German colonel and pilot (died 1982)
- 1916 – Reino Kangasmäki, Finnish wrestler (died 2010)
- 1916 – Zélia Gattai, Brazilian author and photographer (died 2008)
- 1917 – Leonard J. Arrington, American author and academic, founded the Mormon History Association (died 1999)
- 1918 – Athos Bulcão, Brazilian painter and sculptor (died 2008)
- 1919 – Jean Craighead George, American author (died 2012)
- 1920 – John Kneubuhl, Samoan-American historian, screenwriter, and playwright (died 1992)
- 1922 – Pierre Cardin, Italian-French fashion designer (died 2020)
- 1922 – Paula Valenska, Czech actress (died 1994)
- 1923 – Cyril M. Kornbluth, American soldier and author (died 1958)
- 1923 – Wisława Szymborska, Polish poet and translator, Nobel Prize laureate (died 2012)
- 1924 – Chia-ying Yeh, Chinese-born Canadian poet and sinologist (died 2024)
- 1925 – Medgar Evers, American soldier and civil rights movement activist (died 1963)
- 1925 – Patrice Lumumba, Congolese politician, 1st Prime Minister of the Democratic Republic of the Congo (died 1961)
- 1925 – Marvin Rainwater, American singer-songwriter (died 2013)
- 1926 – Octavian Paler, Romanian journalist and politician (died 2007)
- 1927 – Lee Allen, American saxophone player (died 1994)
- 1927 – James Mackay, Baron Mackay of Clashfern, Scottish lawyer and politician, Lord High Chancellor of Great Britain
- 1927 – Brock Peters, American actor (died 2005)
- 1929 – Imelda Marcos, Filipino politician; 10th First Lady of the Philippines
- 1930 – Ahmad Jamal, American jazz musician (died 2023)
- 1930 – Carlos Menem, Argentinian lawyer and politician, 50th President of Argentina (died 2021)
- 1932 – Dave Thomas, American businessman and philanthropist, founded Wendy's (died 2002)
- 1933 – Peter Desbarats, Canadian journalist, author, and playwright (died 2014)
- 1933 – Kenny Wharram, Canadian ice hockey player (died 2017)
- 1934 – Tom Springfield, English musician (died 2022)
- 1935 – Gilbert Kalish, American pianist and educator
- 1936 – Omar Suleiman, Egyptian general and politician, 16th Vice President of Egypt (died 2012)
- 1937 – Polly Holliday, American actress (died 2025)
- 1937 – Richard Petty, American race car driver and sportscaster
- 1938 – David Owen, English physician and politician, Secretary of State for Foreign and Commonwealth Affairs
- 1939 – Mike Castle, American politician, 69th Governor of Delaware (died 2025)
- 1939 – Alexandros Panagoulis, Greek poet and politician (died 1976)
- 1939 – John H. Sununu, American engineer and politician, 14th White House Chief of Staff
- 1939 – Paul Williams, American singer and choreographer (died 1973)
- 1940 – Kenneth Clarke, English politician, Lord High Chancellor of Great Britain
- 1940 – Georgi Ivanov, Bulgarian military officer, cosmonaut and politician
- 1941 – William Guest, American singer-songwriter and producer (died 2015)
- 1941 – Wendell Mottley, Trinidadian sprinter, economist, and politician
- 1942 – John Eekelaar, South African-English lawyer and scholar
- 1942 – Vicente Fox, Mexican businessman and politician, 35th President of Mexico
- 1943 – Larry Lake, American-Canadian trumpet player and composer (died 2013)
- 1946 – Richard Axel, American neuroscientist and biologist, Nobel Prize laureate
- 1946 – Ron Silver, American actor, director, and political activist (died 2009)
- 1947 – Larry David, American actor, comedian, producer, and screenwriter
- 1947 – Ann Taylor, Baroness Taylor of Bolton, English politician, Minister for International Security Strategy
- 1948 – Mutula Kilonzo, Kenyan lawyer and politician (died 2013)
- 1949 – Greg Brown, American musician
- 1949 – Roy Bittan, American rock piano and accordion player (E Street Band)
- 1949 – Robert Paquette, Canadian singer-songwriter and guitarist
- 1950 – Lynne Brindley, English librarian and academic
- 1950 – Jon Trickett, English politician
- 1952 – Sylvia Rivera, American transgender rights activist (died 2002)
- 1952 – Anatoliy Solomin, Ukrainian race walker and coach
- 1953 – Brian Clarke, British artist known for his work with stained glass (died 2025)
- 1954 – Chris Huhne, English journalist and politician, Secretary of State for Energy and Climate Change
- 1954 – Wendy Schaal, American actress
- 1955 – Kim Carr, Australian educator and politician, 31st Australian Minister for Human Services
- 1956 – Jerry Hall, American model and actress
- 1957 – Bret Hart, Canadian wrestler
- 1957 – Jüri Raidla, Estonian lawyer and politician, Estonian Minister of Justice
- 1957 – Purvis Short, American basketball player
- 1958 – Pavan Malhotra, Indian actor
- 1959 – Erwin Olaf, Dutch photographer (died 2023)
- 1961 – Clark Kellogg, American basketball player and sportscaster
- 1962 – Neil Williams, English cricketer (died 2006)
- 1964 – Jose Canseco, Cuban-American baseball player and mixed martial artist
- 1964 – Ozzie Canseco, Cuban-American baseball player, coach, and manager
- 1964 – Joe Magrane, American baseball player and sportscaster
- 1965 – Norbert Röttgen, German lawyer and politician
- 1969 – Tim Rodber, English rugby player
- 1970 – Derrick Adkins, American hurdler
- 1970 – Steve Morrow, Northern Irish footballer and manager
- 1971 – Troy Brown, American football player and actor
- 1971 – Evelyn Lau, Canadian poet and author
- 1971 – Bryan Redpath, Scottish rugby player and coach
- 1972 – Darren Shan, Irish author
- 1974 – Sean Casey, American baseball player and sportscaster
- 1975 – Éric Dazé, Canadian ice hockey player
- 1975 – Kristen Michal, Estonian lawyer and politician
- 1975 – Elizabeth Reaser, American actress
- 1975 – Stefan Terblanche, South African rugby player
- 1976 – Krisztián Lisztes, Hungarian footballer
- 1976 – Tomáš Vokoun, Czech-American ice hockey player
- 1976 – Ľudovít Ódor, Prime minister of Slovakia
- 1977 – Deniz Barış, Turkish footballer
- 1978 – Jüri Ratas, Estonian politician, 42nd Mayor of Tallinn
- 1979 – Walter Davis, American triple jumper
- 1979 – Ahmed al-Ghamdi, Saudi Arabian terrorist, hijacker of United Airlines Flight 175 (died 2001)
- 1979 – Sam Hornish Jr., American race car driver
- 1979 – Joe Thornton, Canadian ice hockey player
- 1980 – Nyjer Morgan, American baseball player
- 1981 – Nathan Ellington, English footballer
- 1981 – Carlos Rogers, American football player
- 1983 – Michelle Branch, American singer-songwriter and guitarist
- 1983 – Kyle Hogg, English cricketer
- 1984 – Thomas Kortegaard, Danish footballer
- 1984 – Elise Stefanik, American politician
- 1984 – Johnny Weir, American figure skater
- 1985 – Chad Henne, American football player
- 1985 – Ashley Tisdale, American actress, singer, and producer
- 1986 – Brett Cecil, American baseball player
- 1986 – Lindsay Lohan, American actress and singer
- 1987 – Esteban Granero, Spanish footballer
- 1988 – Lee Chung-yong, South Korean footballer
- 1989 – Nadezhda Grishaeva, Russian basketball player
- 1989 – Alex Morgan, American soccer player
- 1990 – Kayla Harrison, American judoka
- 1990 – Merritt Mathias, American soccer player
- 1990 – Morag McLellan, Scottish field hockey player
- 1990 – Margot Robbie, Australian actress and producer
- 1990 – Danny Rose, English footballer
- 1990 – Bill Tupou, New Zealand rugby league player
- 1992 – Madison Chock, American ice dancer
- 1992 – Jānis Timma, Latvian basketball player
- 1993 – Vince Staples, American rapper and actor
- 1993 – Saweetie, American rapper
- 1994 – Henrik Kristoffersen, Norwegian skier
- 1994 – Derrick White, American basketball player
- 1995 – Ryan Murphy, American swimmer
- 1996 – Julia Grabher, Austrian tennis player

== Deaths ==
=== Pre-1600 ===
- 626 – Li Jiancheng, Chinese prince (born 589)
- 626 – Li Yuanji, Chinese prince (born 603)
- 649 – Li Jing, Chinese general (born 571)
- 862 – Swithun, English bishop and saint (born c. 800)
- 866 – Robert the Strong, Frankish nobleman
- 936 – Henry the Fowler, German king (born 876)
- 1298 – Adolf, King of the Romans (born 1220)
- 1504 – Stephen III of Moldavia (born 1434)
- 1566 – Nostradamus, French astrologer and author (born 1503)
- 1578 – Thomas Doughty, English explorer
- 1582 – Akechi Mitsuhide, Japanese samurai and warlord (born 1528)
- 1591 – Vincenzo Galilei, Italian lute player and composer (born 1520)

=== 1601–1900 ===
- 1621 – Thomas Harriot, English astronomer, mathematician, and ethnographer (born 1560)
- 1656 – François-Marie, comte de Broglie, Italian-French general (born 1611)
- 1674 – Eberhard III, Duke of Württemberg (born 1614)
- 1743 – Spencer Compton, 1st Earl of Wilmington, English politician, Prime Minister of the United Kingdom (born 1673)
- 1746 – Thomas Baker, English antiquarian and author (born 1656)
- 1778 – Jean-Jacques Rousseau, Swiss philosopher and composer (born 1712)
- 1833 – Gervasio Antonio de Posadas, Argentinian lawyer and politician, 1st Supreme Director of the United Provinces of the Río de la Plata (born 1757)
- 1843 – Samuel Hahnemann, German physician and academic (born 1755)
- 1850 – Robert Peel, English lieutenant and politician, Prime Minister of the United Kingdom (born 1788)
- 1857 – Carlo Pisacane, Italian soldier and philosopher (born 1818)

=== 1901–present ===
- 1903 – Ed Delahanty, American baseball player (born 1867)
- 1912 – Tom Richardson, English cricketer (born 1870)
- 1914 – Joseph Chamberlain, English businessman and politician, Secretary of State for the Colonies (born 1836)
- 1915 – Porfirio Díaz, Mexican general and politician, 29th President of Mexico (born 1830)
- 1920 – William Louis Marshall, American general and engineer (born 1846)
- 1926 – Émile Coué, French psychologist and pharmacist (born 1857)
- 1929 – Gladys Brockwell, American actress (born 1894)
- 1932 – Manuel II of Portugal (born 1889)
- 1955 – Edward Lawson, English soldier, Victoria Cross recipient (born 1873)
- 1961 – Ernest Hemingway, American novelist, short story writer, and journalist, Nobel Prize laureate (born 1899)
- 1963 – Alicia Patterson, American publisher, co-founded Newsday (born 1906)
- 1964 – Fireball Roberts, American race car driver (born 1929)
- 1966 – Jan Brzechwa, Polish poet, author, and lawyer (born 1900)
- 1970 – Jessie Street, Australian suffragette and feminist (born 1889)
- 1972 – Joseph Fielding Smith, American religious leader, 10th President of The Church of Jesus Christ of Latter-day Saints (born 1876)
- 1973 – Betty Grable, American actress, singer, and dancer (born 1916)
- 1973 – George McBride, American baseball player and manager (born 1880)
- 1973 – Ferdinand Schörner, German field marshal and convicted war criminal (born 1892)
- 1975 – James Robertson Justice, English actor (born 1907)
- 1977 – Vladimir Nabokov, Russian-born novelist and critic (born 1899)
- 1978 – Aris Alexandrou, Greek author and poet (born 1922)
- 1980 – Tom Barry, leader of the Irish Republican Army during the Irish War of Independence and the Irish Civil War (born 1897)
- 1986 – Peanuts Lowrey, American baseball player and manager (born 1917)
- 1988 – Allie Vibert Douglas, Canadian astronomer and astrophysicist (born 1894)
- 1989 – Andrei Gromyko, Soviet economist and politician, Soviet Minister of Foreign Affairs (born 1909)
- 1990 – Snooky Lanson, American singer (born 1914)
- 1991 – Lee Remick, American actress (born 1935)
- 1993 – Fred Gwynne, American actor (born 1926)
- 1994 – Andrés Escobar, Colombian footballer (born 1967)
- 1995 – Lloyd MacPhail, Canadian businessman and politician, 23rd Lieutenant Governor of Prince Edward Island (born 1920)
- 1997 – James Stewart, American actor (born 1908)
- 1999 – Mario Puzo, American author and screenwriter (born 1920)
- 2000 – Joey Dunlop, Northern Irish motorcycle racer (born 1952)
- 2002 – Ray Brown, American jazz musician and composer (born 1926)
- 2003 – Briggs Cunningham, American race car driver and businessman (born 1907)
- 2004 – Mochtar Lubis, Indonesian journalist and author (born 1922)
- 2005 – Ernest Lehman, American director, producer, and screenwriter (born 1915)
- 2005 – Norm Prescott, American actor, composer, and producer, co-founded Filmation Studios (born 1927)
- 2006 – Jan Murray, American comedian, actor, and game show host (born 1916)
- 2007 – Beverly Sills, American operatic soprano and television personality (born 1929)
- 2008 – Natasha Shneider, Russian-American singer, keyboard player, and actress (born 1956)
- 2008 – Elizabeth Spriggs, English actress and screenwriter (born 1929)
- 2010 – Beryl Bainbridge, English screenwriter and author (born 1932)
- 2011 – Itamar Franco, Brazilian engineer and politician, 33rd President of Brazil (born 1930)
- 2012 – Maurice Chevit, French actor and screenwriter (born 1923)
- 2012 – Julian Goodman, American journalist (born 1922)
- 2012 – Angelo Mangiarotti, Italian architect and academic (born 1921)
- 2012 – Betty Meggers, American archaeologist and academic (born 1921)
- 2012 – Ed Stroud, American baseball player (born 1939)
- 2013 – Anthony G. Bosco, American bishop (born 1927)
- 2013 – Douglas Engelbart, American computer scientist, invented the computer mouse (born 1925)
- 2013 – Armand Gaudreault, Canadian ice hockey player (born 1921)
- 2013 – Anthony Llewellyn, Welsh-American chemist, academic, and astronaut (born 1933)
- 2014 – Emilio Álvarez Montalván, Nicaraguan ophthalmologist and politician (born 1919)
- 2014 – Manuel Cardona, Spanish physicist and academic (born 1934)
- 2014 – Mary Innes-Ker, Duchess of Roxburghe (born 1915)
- 2014 – Harold W. Kuhn, American mathematician and academic (born 1925)
- 2014 – Louis Zamperini, American runner and World War II US Army Air Forces captain (born 1917)
- 2015 – Ronald Davison, New Zealand lawyer and judge, 10th Chief Justice of New Zealand (born 1920)
- 2015 – Charlie Sanders, American football player and sportscaster (born 1946)
- 2015 – Jim Weaver, American football player and coach (born 1945)
- 2015 – Jacobo Zabludovsky, Mexican journalist (born 1928)
- 2016 – Caroline Aherne, English actress and comedian (born 1963)
- 2016 – Michael Cimino, American director, producer, and screenwriter (born 1939)
- 2016 – Patrick Manning, 4th & 6th Prime Minister of Trinidad and Tobago (born 1946)
- 2016 – Elie Wiesel, Holocaust survivor, activist, and author (born 1928)
- 2017 – Vladislav Rastorotsky, a Russian (and former Soviet) artistic gymnastics coach, (born 1933)
- 2017 – Smith Hart, American-born Canadian professional wrestler (born 1948)
- 2018 – Alan Longmuir, Scottish musician (born 1948)
- 2019 – Lee Iacocca, American automotive executive (born 1924)
- 2020 – Ángela Jeria, Chilean archaeologist and human rights activist (born 1926)
- 2020 – Byron Bernstein, American Twitch streamer (born 1989)
- 2025 – Sophia Hutchins, American socialite (born 1996)
- 2025 – Julian McMahon, Australian-American actor (born 1968)

== Holidays and observances ==
- Christian feast day:
  - Aberoh and Atom (Coptic Church)
  - Bernardino Realino
  - Blessed Eugénie Joubert
  - Feast of the Visitation (Anglicanism; Levoča at Mariánska hora)
  - Monegundis
  - Oudoceus
  - Martinian and Processus
  - Pishoy (Coptic Church)
  - Stephen III of Moldavia (Romanian Orthodox Church)
  - July 2 (Eastern Orthodox liturgics)
- Flag Day (Curaçao)
- Palio di Provenzano (Siena, Italy)
- Police Day (Azerbaijan)
