= Negationism of the military dictatorship of Chile =

Denial of the actions of the Chilean military dictatorship

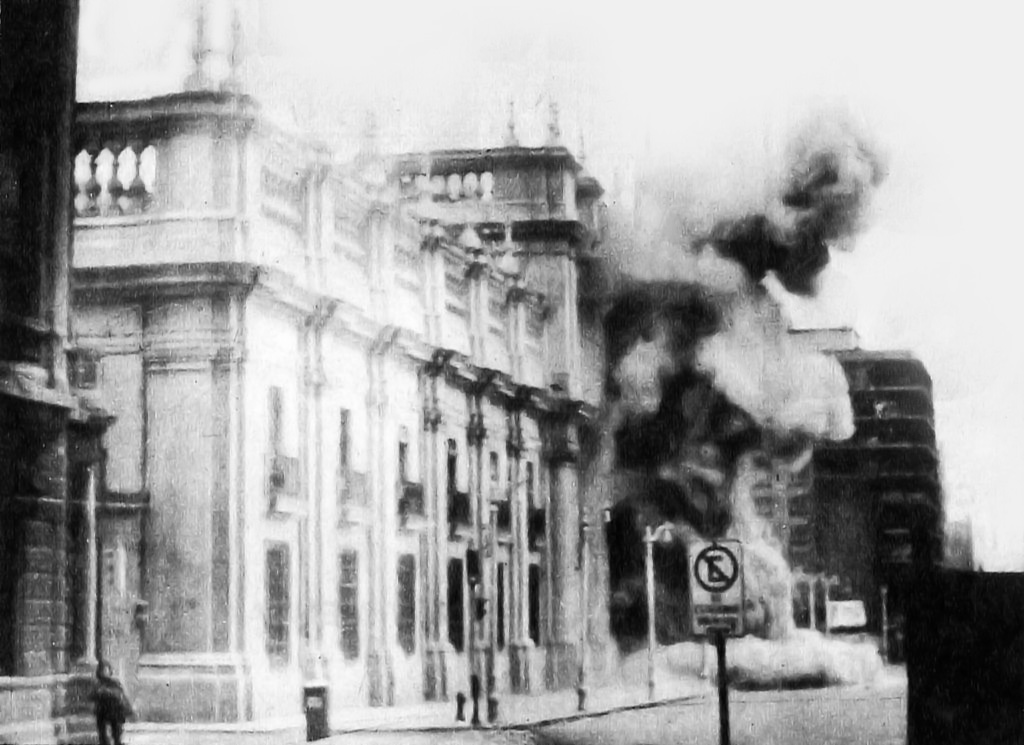
Palacio de la Moneda. 1973.

The denialism of the military dictatorship in Chile is a type of negationist historical revisionism existing in Chile. It is a series of arguments and beliefs that seek to relativize, justify and even deny the crimes, human rights violations and antidemocratic actions committed during the military dictatorship (1973–1990).

During this period, members of the three branches of the Armed Forces of Chile, officials of Carabineros and plainclothes members of the secret police of the military dictatorship (the DINA and the CNI) carried out a policy of systematic, prolonged, mass repression and persecution, imprisonment, kidnapping, torture, murder and forced disappearance of political opponents to the dictatorship. In order to hide or disassociate itself from responsibility for these crimes, the regime systematically resorted to strategies such as the creation of fake combats, censorship and disinformation.

According to the reports of the Truth and Reconciliation Commission (known as the "Rettig Report"), the National Reparation and Reconciliation Corporation, and the National Commission on Political Imprisonment and Torture ("Valech Report)", the official number of direct victims would amount to 31,686 people, of which 28,459 cases were victims of torture and 3,227 cases were executed or missing victims (2,125 dead and 1,102 missing).

== Denialist arguments ==
=== Justification of the coup d'état against Allende ===
Many supporters of the overthrow of Salvador Allende argue that what happened on September 11, 1973, in Chile was a military pronunciamiento and not a coup d'état. Pinochet and his military junta maintained that the coup was necessary to avoid a war, a thesis that was supported by the Christian Democratic Union and the Christian Social Union of West Germany in the early 1970s. A few days after the coup d'état, various national newspapers, as well as civil and military ones, promoted the supposed existence of the so-called Plan Zeta, which was later attempted to be made official through the White Book of Change of Government in Chile.

In a survey carried out by the Chile21 foundation with the collaboration of the political scientist Claudia Heiss, the former senator Carlos Ominani and the writer Patricio Fernández in May 2023, 36% of those surveyed thought that the military was right when carrying out the coup d'état against the president Salvador Allende, while 13% thought that Allende was to blame for the coup.

In September 2023, on the eve of the commemoration of the fifty years of the coup d'état of 1973, President Gabriel Boric proposed to all the political parties of Chile to sign a "commitment to democracy" for the future of the country, as such, the Independent Democratic Union (UDI) refused to sign so as not to put itself "at the service of an official truth in this matter." For its part, Deputy Sergio Bobadilla of the UDI made an appearance at the Congress with a commemorative badge of the coup with the words "National Liberation" and "50 years 1973–2023".

=== Denial of its status as a dictatorship ===
In 2012, then-President Sebastián Piñera changed the way in which school textbooks refer to the Pinochet dictatorship, approving the change from the term "military dictatorship" to "military regime" in history books from the first to sixth year of basic education, a decision that caused controversy in the country. Alberto Cardemil, a former minister under Augusto Pinochet and then deputy of National Renewal, pointed out that the modification:

(It) responds to a technical, professional effort by the Ministry of Education, to give a balanced version of our recent and past history.

In a survey carried out by the consulting firm Pulso Ciudadano in July 2023, 47.5% of those surveyed said that Augusto Pinochet was a "dictator" of Chile, while 31.75% indicated that he was only a "president". Former deputy José Antonio Kast of the Republican Party declared in 2021 that "elections were held", ignoring the 1973 Chilean coup d'etat.

=== Denial of state repression ===
The denial of state repression began during the dictatorship itself. In 1975 Sergio Diez, Chile's ambassador at the time to the United Nations, denied before the organization the existence of missing detainees. Diez declared in 2004 that he was deceived by the government of Augusto Pinochet to state that.

In 1986, a group of soldiers patrolling the streets during a Day of National Protest intercepted, beat, doused with fuel and burned two young people: Carmen Gloria Quintana and the photographer Rodrigo Rojas de Negri; this case was later renamed the Quemados Case. The issue was omitted by the press and Francisco Javier Cuadra, the general minister of government during the dictatorship, said that it was "political abuse [against the Pinochet regime]".

Claudio Rojas, Minister of Culture of the government of Sebastián Piñera, co-wrote his book Diálogos de conversos (2015) with Roberto Ampuero, Minister of Foreign Affairs that the Museum of Memory and Human Rights (which was built to commemorate the victims of human rights violations), was a "montage", whose purpose was "to shock the viewer, leave him astonished, [and] prevent him from reasoning", a matter that ended in his resignation when it was discovered in 2018, and Piñera's declaration of condemnation of "the violations of human rights humans at any time, place and circumstance", because according to him, his government "does not share his" opinions and statements regarding the meaning and mission of the Museum of Memory, which collects the testimonies, experiences, evidence and teachings of a very dark period of the country in relation to human rights".

Former deputy José Antonio Kast of the Republican Party said in 2021 that "opponents were not locked up" during that time. In 2022, deputy Cristián Araya, also from the Republican Party, gave his opinion that the Museum of Memory belonged to "some" and criticized the use of public funds for the "alleged search for missing detainees (of the dictatorship)." For her part, the representative Gloria Naveillán described sexual assaults in the military regime as an "urban legend" in 2023, a statement that brought criticism within her former party.

=== Miracle of Chile ===
The American economist Milton Friedman coined the term miracle of Chile to describe the result of the economic policies implemented during the dictatorship; however, these have been refuted and contrasted over time.

In 1973, during the presidency of Salvador Allende, Chile had an inflation rate of 606%. However, the privatizations that occurred benefited government supporters, while the ban on unions prevented workers from demanding improvements in their economic conditions. At the same time, in the first year of the Pinochet dictatorship, real wages fell by 53% per conservative estimates.

Between 1982 and 1983 the GDP fell by 14.3% and the country went through an economic crisis framed in La Década Perdida, which motivated the International Monetary Fund had to come to the aid of the Chilean economy; at the same time, the Central Bank had to carry out a rescue operation for the private banks. At the end of the military dictatorship, the poverty rate reached 40% nationwide.

== Legality ==
In 2011, a bill was presented to punish "anyone who carries out acts in honor, homage or tribute to people convicted of crimes against humanity", whose execution did not prosper in the Senate.

In September 2022, a bill on "denialism, reparation and guarantee of non-repetition in the context of the Chilean civil-military dictatorship" was presented to be voted on in the Senate that seeks to incorporate into the Penal Code the crime of denialism of the crimes against humanity committed during that period, similar to the law existing in Brazil in 2019.

== See also ==
- Pinochetism
