= July 2 (Eastern Orthodox liturgics) =

Day in the Eastern Orthodox liturgical calendar

Eastern Orthodox liturgical calendar
July 1	July 2	July 3
July 2 O.S. ≍ July 15 N.S. July 2 N.S ≍ June 19 O.S.

An Eastern Orthodox cross

July 2 in Eastern Orthodox liturgical calendars is a feast day and a day of commemoration of saints and martyrs. Although some Orthodox churches use the Revised Julian Calendar and others use the traditional Julian calendar, the fixed commemorations for their respective July 2 are broadly the same, no matter which calendar is used. (Note: Despite the dates being the same, the days to which they refer typically differ by 13 days. The notation Old Style or O.S. is sometimes used to indicate a date in the traditional Julian Calendar (the "Old Calendar"). The notation New Style or N.S. indicates a date in the Revised Julian calendar (the "New Calendar").)

== Saints ==
- Martyrs Anthimus the Elder, Paul, Bilonus, Theonas, Heron, and another 36 Egyptians, at Thessalonica (c. 305-310)
- Martyr Quintus of Phrygia (c. 285) (see also: March 2 )
- Saint Juvenal of Jerusalem, Patriarch of Jerusalem (458)
- Saint Basil of Jerusalem, Patriarch of Jerusalem (836 or 838)

== Pre-Schism Western saints ==
- Three Martyrs of Rome, three soldiers who were converted at the martyrdom of the Apostle Paul in Rome, and then were themselves martyred (c. 68) (Note: "Also, at Rome, three holy soldiers, who were converted to Christ by the martyrdom of the blessed Apostle Paul, and with him merited to be made partakers of heavenly glory.")
- Saint Acestes, one of the three soldiers who led St Paul to execution in Rome, he was converted by him, and they were beheaded (1st century)
- Saints Processus and Martinian, martyrs who were greatly venerated in Rome. (Note: Their tomb and basilica were on the Aurelian Way. Their relics are in St Peter's in Rome.) (Note: "At Rome, on the Aurelian road, the birthday of the holy martyrs Processus and Martinian, who were baptized by the blessed apostle Peter in the Mamertine prison. After being struck on the mouth, racked, scourged with thongs and whips tipped with pieces of metal; after being beaten with rods and exposed to the flames, they were beheaded in the days of Nero, and thus obtained the crown of martyrdom.")
- Saints Ariston, Crescentian, Eutychian, Urban, Vitalis, Justus, Felicissimus, Felix, Marcia and Symphorosa, a group of martyrs in the Campagna, under Diocletian (c. 285) (Note: "The same day, the holy martyrs Ariston, Crescentian, Eutychian, Urbanus, Vitalis, Justus, Felicissimus, Felix, Marcia, and Symphorosa, who were all crowned with martyrdom when the persecution of the emperor Diocletian was raging.")
- Saint Monegundis of Chartres (Monegunde, Monegunda), in Gaul (570) (Note: A woman in Chartres in France who became an anchoress after the death of her two daughters. She spent most of her life near Tours.) (Note: "At Tours, the demise of St. Monegundes, a pious woman."")
- Saint Oudaceus (Eddogwy), third Bishop of Llandaff in Wales (c. 615) (Note: Born in Brittany, he lived in Wales where he became a bishop near Llandaff.)
- Saint Swithun, Bishop and Wonderworker of Winchester (862) (Note: Born in Wessex in England, he spent his youth at the monastery in Winchester. He became a priest and in 852 Bishop of Winchester. On his repose and at his request, he was buried in the cemetery outside the minster. His relics were translated into the cathedral in 971, many miracles occurring, not least very heavy rainfall which gave rise to the popular saying, 'St Swithn's day if thou dost rain, For forty days it will remain' .) (Note: "At Winchester, in England, St. Swithin, bishop, whose sanctity was illustrated by the gift of miracles.")

== Post-Schism Orthodox saints ==
- Saint Photius of Kiev, Metropolitan of Kiev (1431)
- Right-believing King Stephen the Great, of Moldavia (1504)
- Saint Juvenaly of Alaska, Proto-martyr of America and Alaska (1796) (Note: See also: September 24 - Synaxis of All Saints of Alaska - Arrival in America of the first Orthodox Mission (1794); December 13 - Synaxis of the First Martyrs of the American land.)
- Saint John (Maximovitch), Archbishop of Shanghai and San Francisco (1966)

=== New martyrs and confessors ===
- New Martyr Lampros of Makri, Alexandroupoli, in Thrace (1835)

== Icons ==
- Icon of the Most Holy Theotokos "Turkovitska" (13th century)
- Icon of the Most Holy Theotokos "Of Akhtyra" (1739) (Note: See also: (in Russian) Ахтырская икона Божией Матери. Википедии. (Russian Wikipedia).)
- Icon of the Most Holy Theotokos "Theodotiev" (1487) (Note: See also: (in Russian) Феодотьевская икона Божией Матери. Википедии. (Russian Wikipedia).)
- Icon of the Most Holy Theotokos "The Root of Jesse". (Note: See also: (in Russian) Древо_Иессеево_(иконография)#Галерея. Википедии. (Russian Wikipedia).)
- Icon of the Most Holy Theotokos "Pozai" (17th century)

== Other commemorations ==
- The placing of the Honorable Robe of the Most Holy Theotokos at Blachernae (5th century)
- Feast of the Robe of the Most Holy Theotokos, Georgia.
- Translation (1483) of the relics of Saint Arsenius of Tver.
- Uncovering of the relics (2003) of New Hieromartyr Sergius Florinsky, Priest of Rakvere, Estonia (1918) (Note: See also: (in Russian) Флоринский, Сергей Фёдорович. Википедии. (Russian Wikipedia).) (see also: December 17 )
- Repose of Archimandrite Lawrence of the Iveron-Valdai Monastery (1876)
- Repose of Elder Zachariah, Schema-Archimandrite of St. Sergius Lavra (1936)

== Icon gallery ==
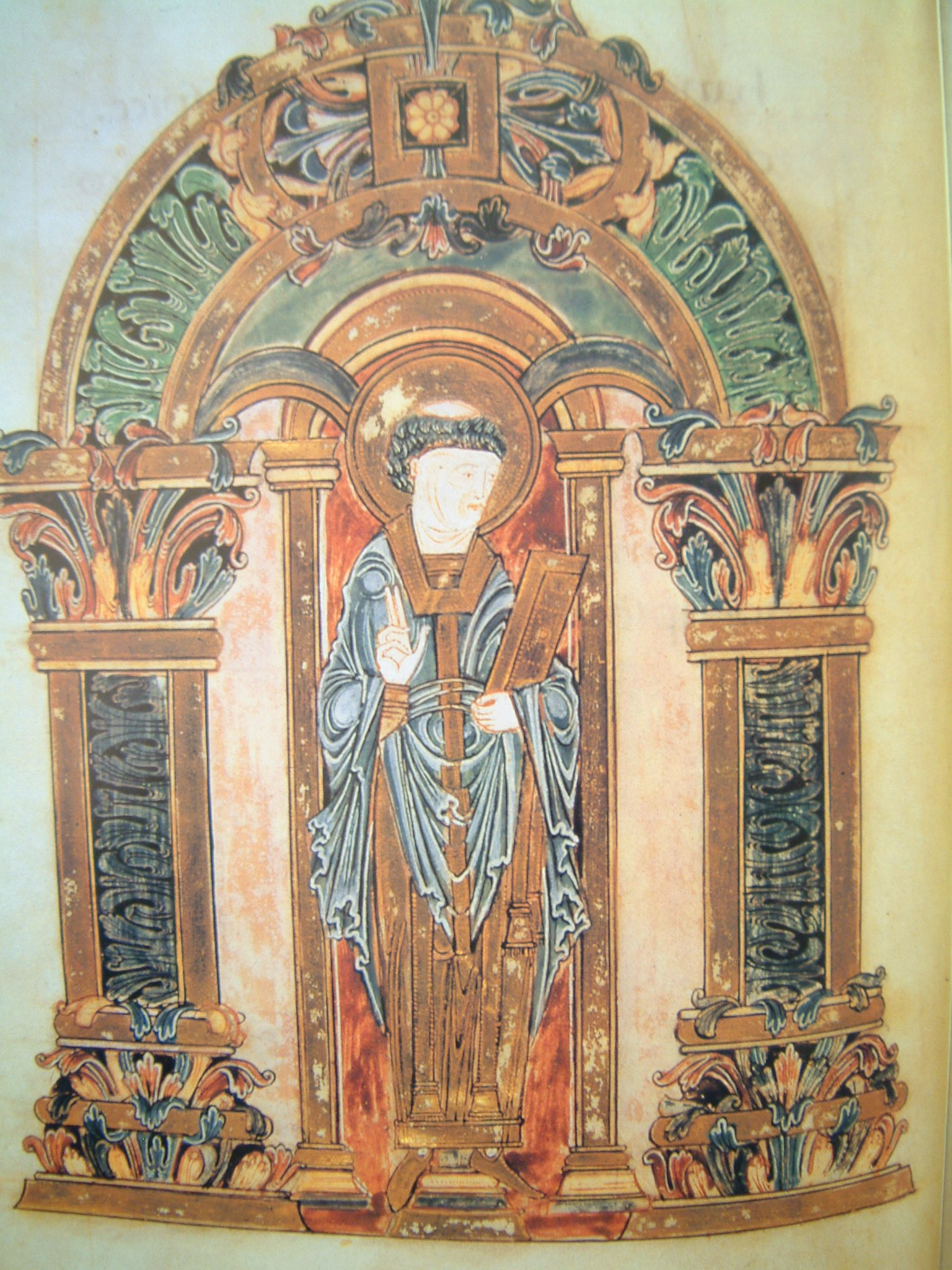
St. Swithun, Bishop and Wonderworker of Winchester.

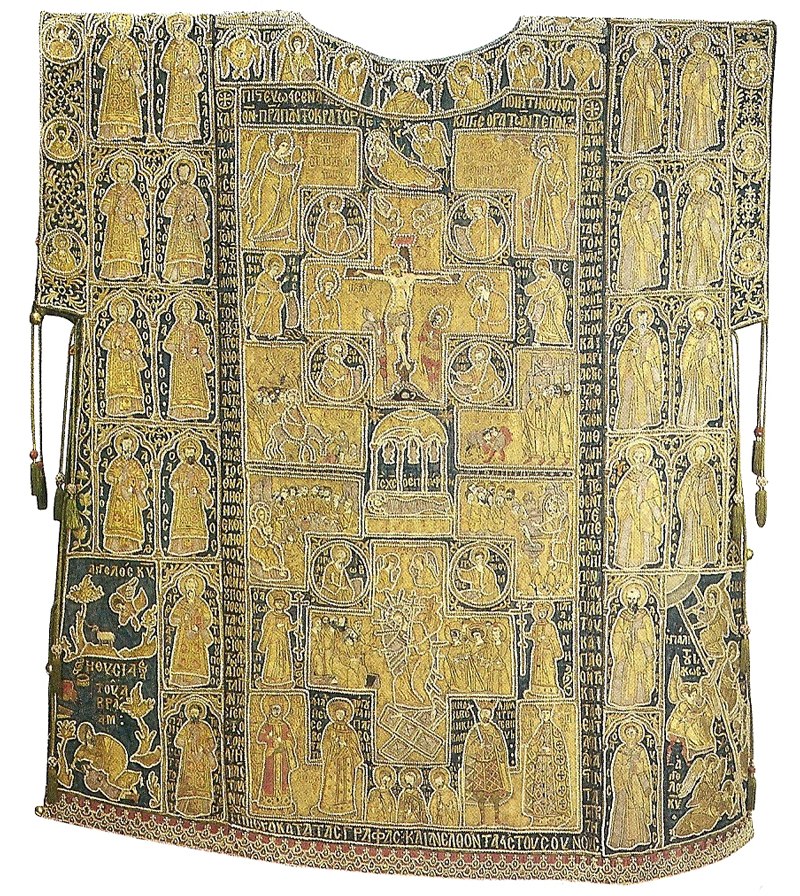
The Large Sakkos of St. Photius of Kiev, Metropolitan of Kiev.

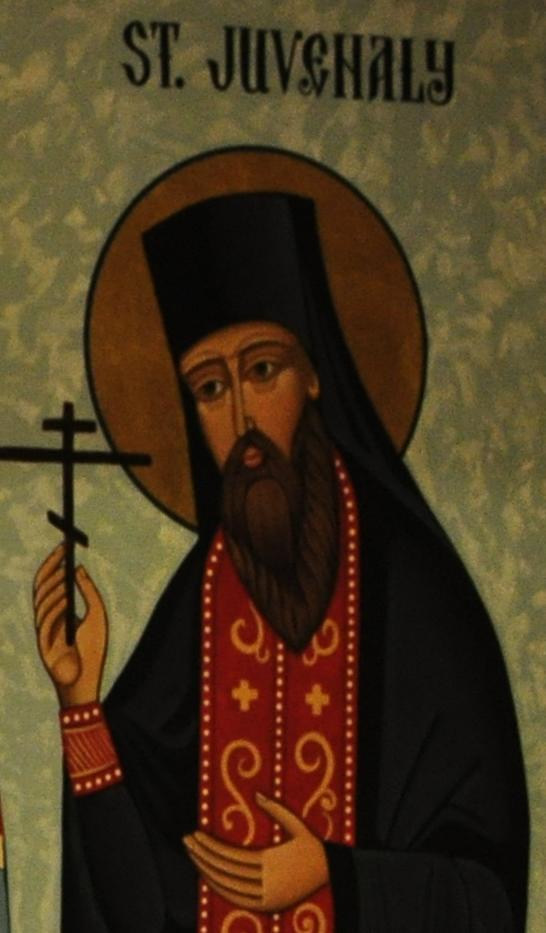
St. Juvenaly of Alaska, Proto-martyr of America and Alaska.

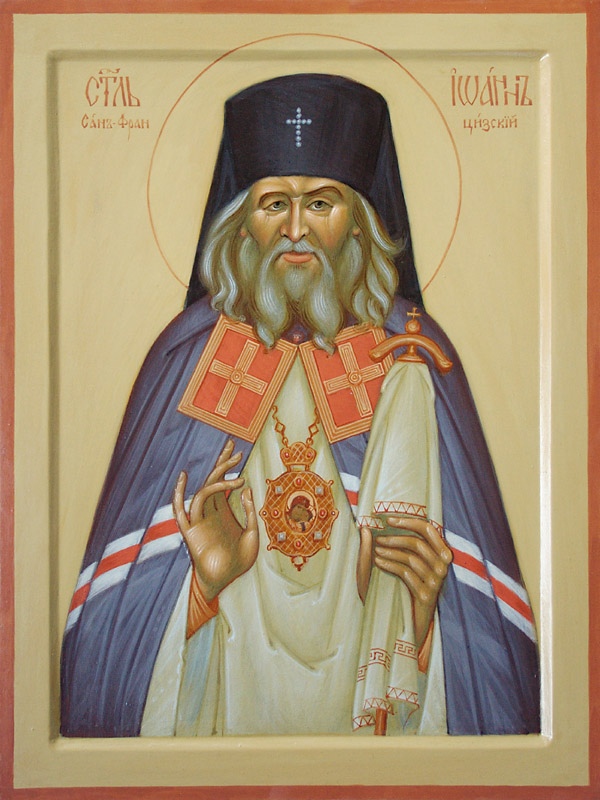
St. John (Maximovitch), Archbishop of Shanghai and San Francisco.

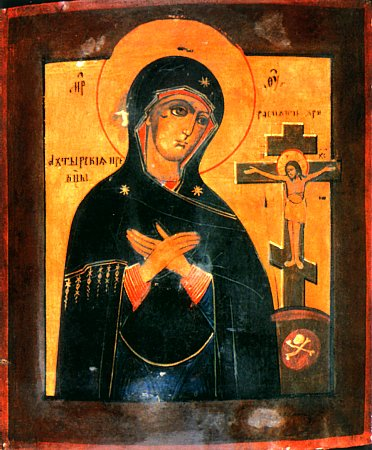
Icon of the Most Holy Theotokos "Of Akhtyra".

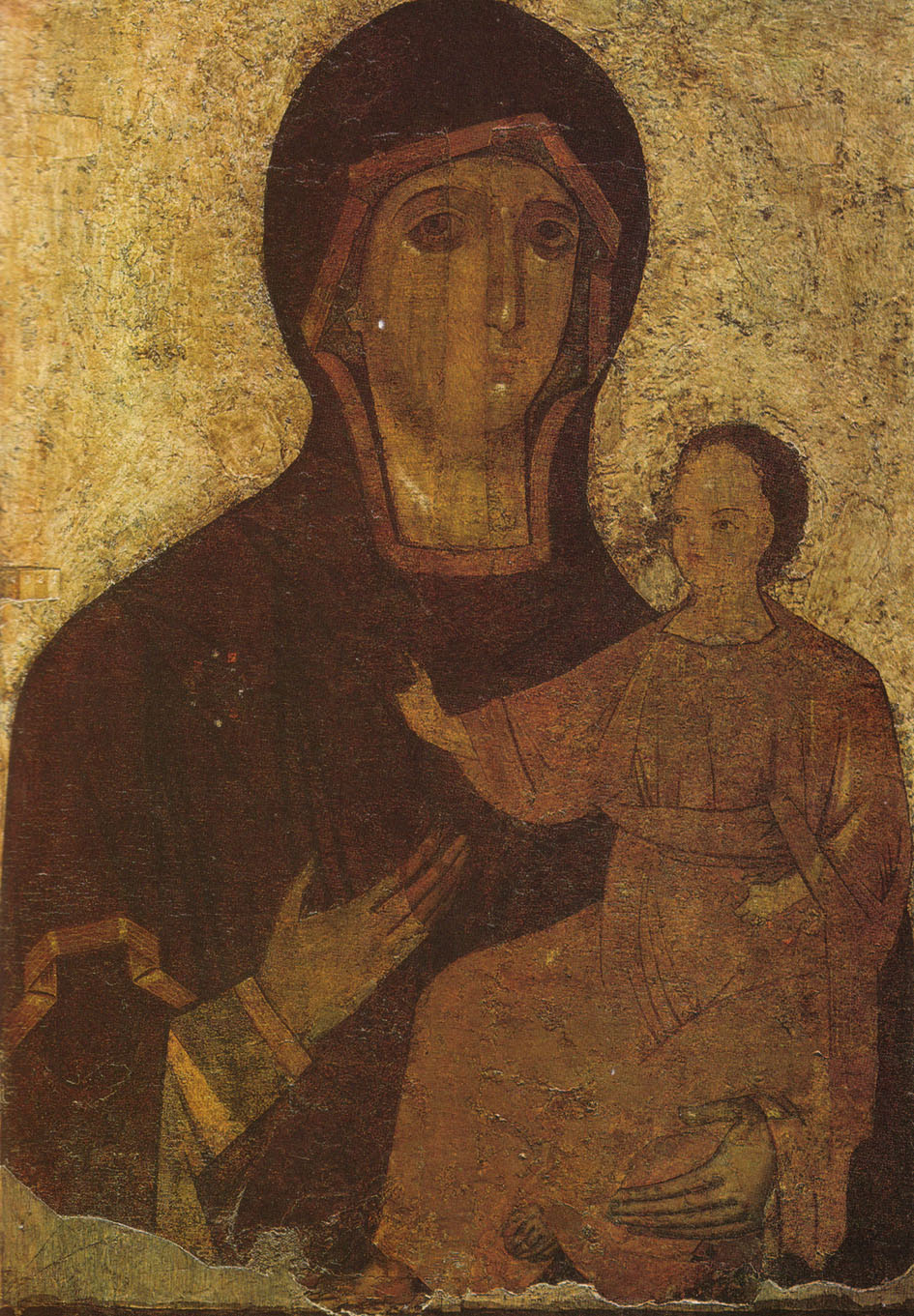
Icon of the Most Holy Theotokos "Theodotiev".

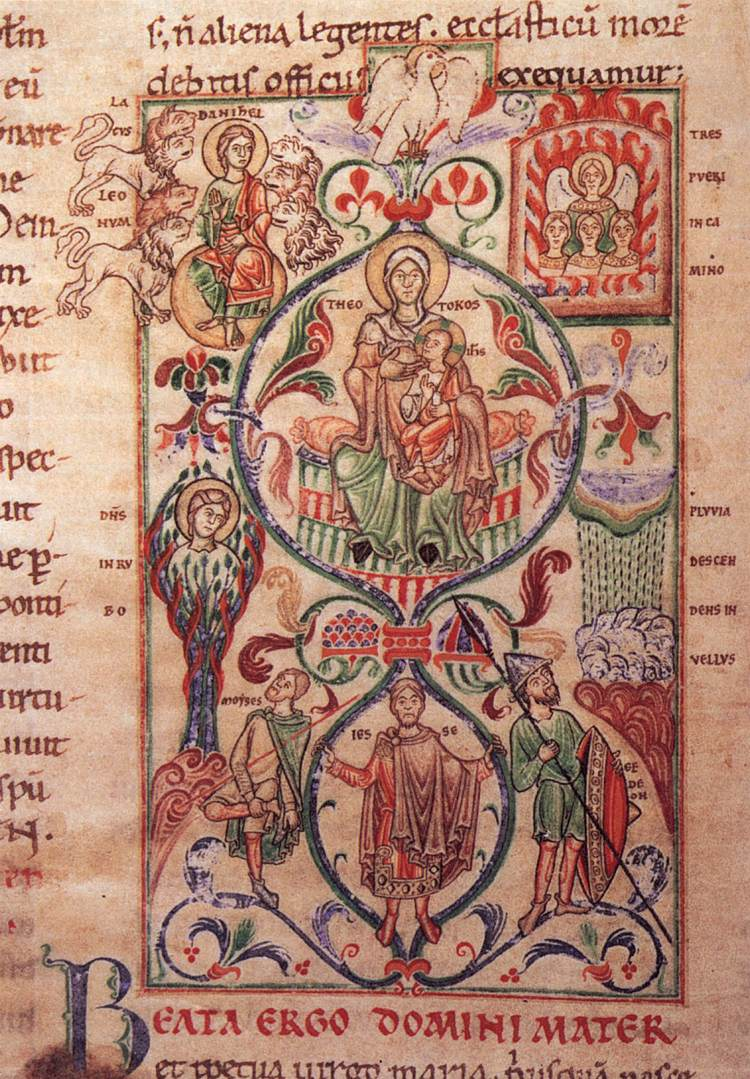
Miniature of the Most Holy Theotokos "The Root of Jesse".

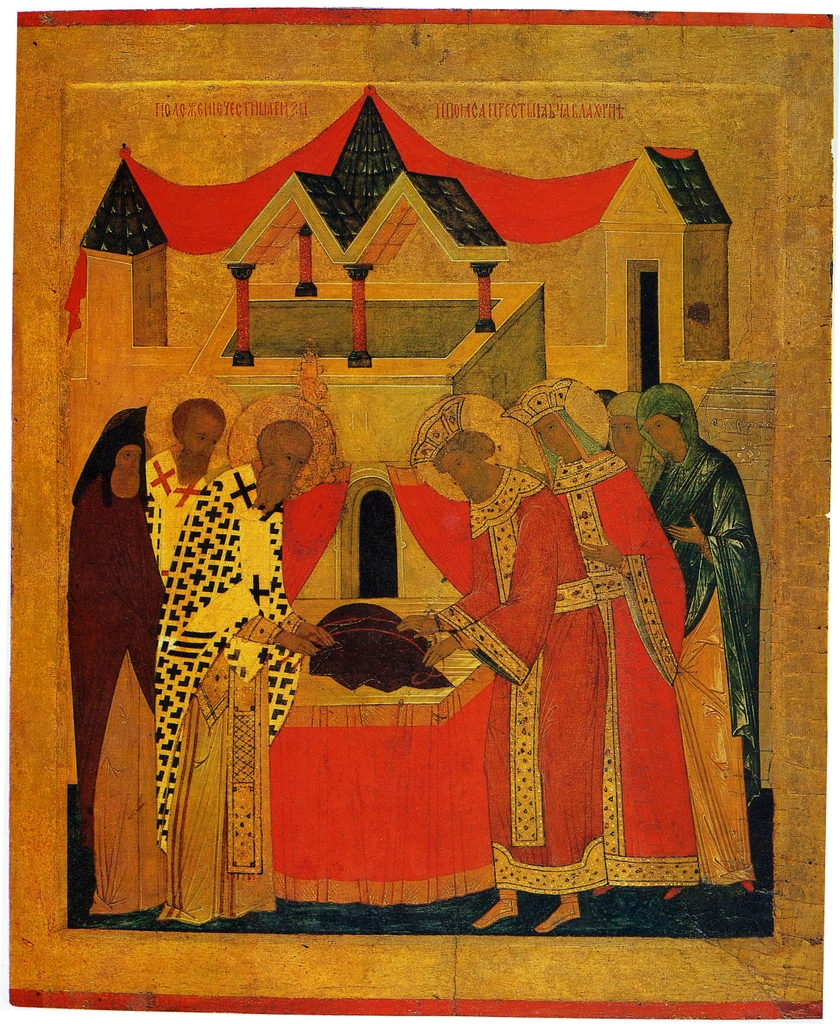
Deposition of the Robe of the Most Holy Theotokos at Blachernae

== Sources ==
- July 2/July 15. Orthodox Calendar (PRAVOSLAVIE.RU).
- July 15 / July 2. HOLY TRINITY RUSSIAN ORTHODOX CHURCH (A parish of the Patriarchate of Moscow).
- July 2. OCA - The Lives of the Saints.
- July 2. The Year of Our Salvation - Holy Transfiguration Monastery, Brookline, Massachusetts.
- The Autonomous Orthodox Metropolia of Western Europe and the Americas (ROCOR). St. Hilarion Calendar of Saints for the year of our Lord 2004. St. Hilarion Press (Austin, TX). p. 49.
- The Second Day of the Month of July. Orthodoxy in China.
- July 2. Latin Saints of the Orthodox Patriarchate of Rome.
- The Roman Martyrology. Transl. by the Archbishop of Baltimore. Last Edition, According to the Copy Printed at Rome in 1914. Revised Edition, with the Imprimatur of His Eminence Cardinal Gibbons. Baltimore: John Murphy Company, 1916. pp. 191–192.
- Rev. Richard Stanton. A Menology of England and Wales, or, Brief Memorials of the Ancient British and English Saints Arranged According to the Calendar, Together with the Martyrs of the 16th and 17th Centuries. London: Burns & Oates, 1892. pp. 297–302.

Greek Sources

- Great Synaxaristes: (in Greek) 2 ΙΟΥΛΙΟΥ. ΜΕΓΑΣ ΣΥΝΑΞΑΡΙΣΤΗΣ.
- (in Greek) Συναξαριστής. 2 Ιουλίου. ECCLESIA.GR. (H ΕΚΚΛΗΣΙΑ ΤΗΣ ΕΛΛΑΔΟΣ).
- (in Greek) ΙΟΥΛΙΟΣ. Αποστολική Διακονία της Εκκλησίας της Ελλάδος (Apostoliki Diakonia of the Church of Greece).
- (in Greek) 02/07/2018. Ορθόδοξος Συναξαριστής.

Russian Sources

- (in Russian) 15 июля (2 июля). Православная Энциклопедия под редакцией Патриарха Московского и всея Руси Кирилла (электронная версия). (Orthodox Encyclopedia - Pravenc.ru).
- (in Russian) 2 июля по старому стилю / 15 июля по новому стилю. Русская Православная Церковь - Православный церковный календарь на 2017 год.
- (in Russian) 2 июля (ст.ст.) 15 июля 2014 (нов. ст.). Русская Православная Церковь Отдел внешних церковных связей. (DECR).
