= Pinochetism =

Chilean political ideology named after Augusto Pinochet

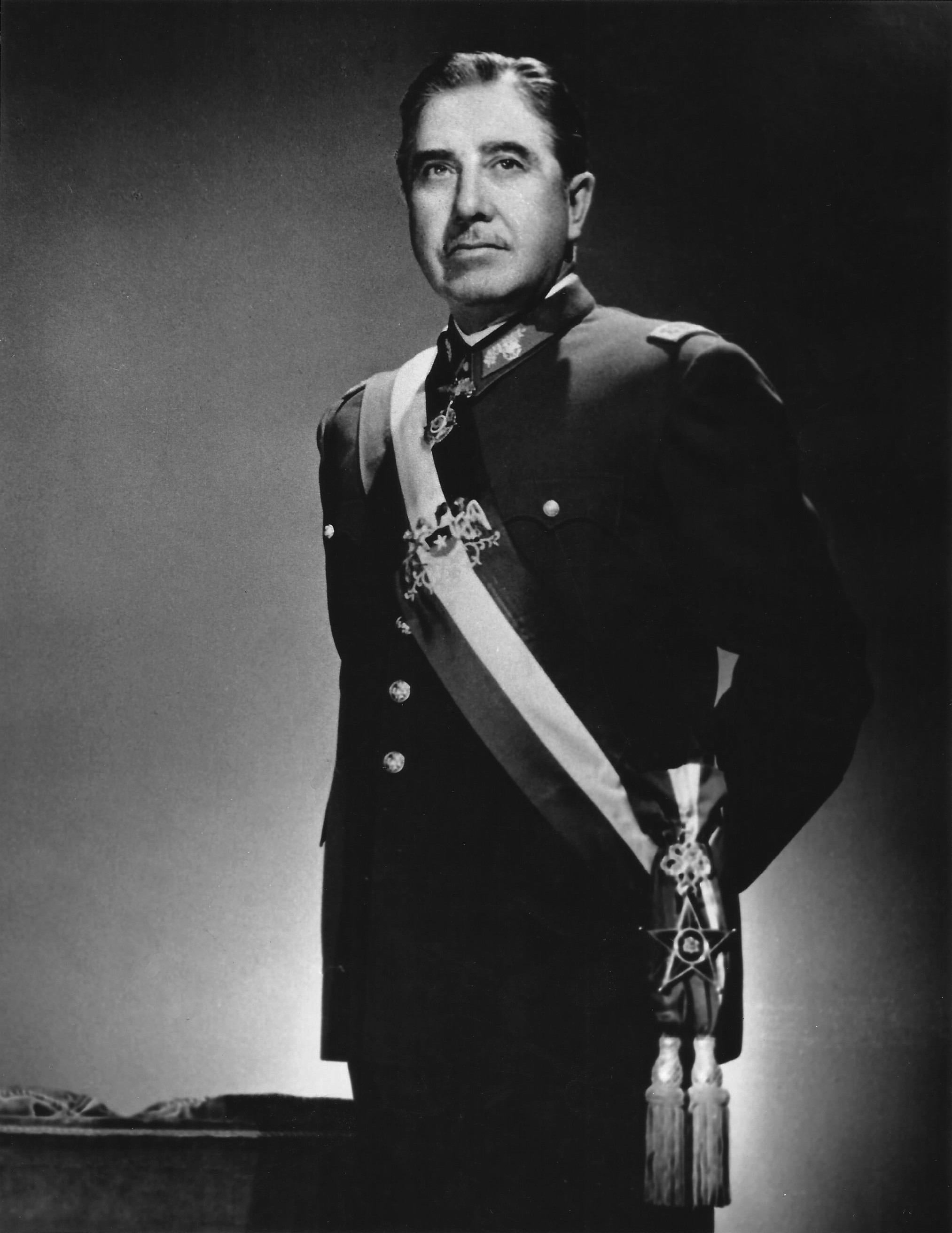
Pinochet as President of Chile during the military dictatorship, c. 1974

Pinochetism (Spanish: pinochetismo) is an authoritarian political ideology rooted in the 17-year military dictatorship of Augusto Pinochet. Characterized by its staunch anti-communism, conservatism, militarism, and nationalism, Pinochetism represents a distinct strand of right-wing politics in Chile that combines authoritarian rule with free-market economics. The ideology's economic dimension was shaped by the Chicago Boys, Chilean economists who implemented neoliberal reforms that dramatically restructured Chile's financial system.

== Core tenets ==
=== Political authoritarianism ===
Pinochetism centers on strong, centralized authority and limited political pluralism. The ideology emerged from the military coup that overthrew Salvador Allende's socialist government, justifying authoritarian measures as necessary to combat communist influence and restore national stability. This approach involved the suppression of left-wing parties, restriction of civil liberties, and establishment of a security apparatus to maintain control.

=== Economic neoliberalism ===
The economic foundation of Pinochetism was laid by the Chicago Boys, who implemented radical free-market reforms including widespread privatization, deregulation, and trade liberalization. This neoliberal project transformed Chile from a protected, state-directed economy to one of Latin America's most open market systems, creating what supporters termed the "Chilean Miracle" despite significant social costs and increased inequality.

=== Anti-communism ===
Anti-communism served as both a justification for the initial coup and a continuing ideological pillar. Pinochetism framed itself as a bulwark against Marxist influence in Chile and the broader Cold War context, with the regime positioning Chile as a frontline state in the global struggle against communism.

=== Nationalism and militarism ===
The ideology emphasizes national pride and the military's role as guardian of Chilean identity and values. This militaristic orientation privileged hierarchical organization and discipline as essential virtues for national governance, with the armed forces seen as the ultimate arbiters of political legitimacy.

== Historical development ==
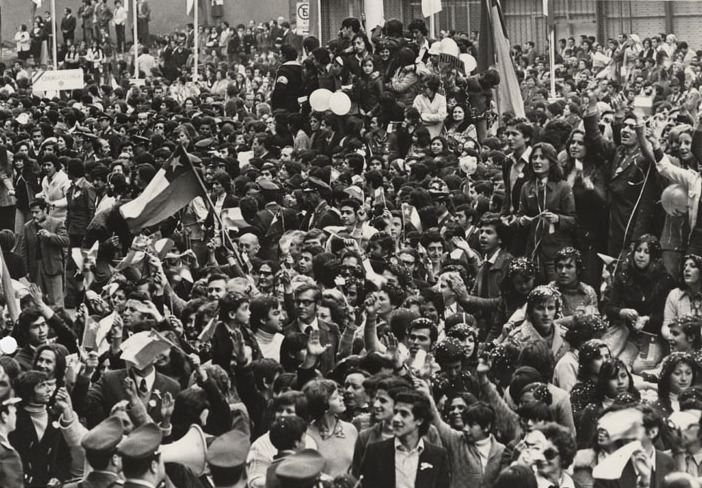
Demonstration in support of the Pinochet regime on September 11, 1976

=== Military dictatorship (1973–1990) ===
Following the 1973 coup, the junta immediately banned left-wing parties and restricted political activity across the spectrum. While formal party politics were suspended until 1987, various support groups emerged to bolster the regime. Lucía Hiriart, Pinochet's wife, mobilized women through CEMA Chile, an organization with over 500,000 members that served as both a social welfare vehicle and political base.

The regime enjoyed international support from like-minded figures, including Spanish far-right politician Blas Piñar, who repeatedly expressed admiration for Pinochet's leadership. During the 1980s, organized support for the dictatorship coalesced around groups like the National Union Movement and eventually the Independent Democratic Union (UDI), which became the primary civilian vehicle for Pinochetist politics.

The 1980 constitution created a framework for limited political activity, culminating in the 1988 plebiscite that ultimately ended Pinochet's rule. Throughout this period, dedicated Pinochetist organizations like the Pinochetist Independent Movement maintained vocal support for the dictator, though they remained marginal compared to broader conservative coalitions.

=== Transition to democracy and evolution ===
Following the return to democracy in 1990, Pinochetism persisted as an influential current within Chilean right-wing politics, though many mainstream conservatives distanced themselves from the dictatorship's human rights record. The ideology found institutional expression primarily through the UDI, which maintained loyalty to Pinochet's legacy while participating in democratic politics.

Pinochet's 1998 arrest in London sparked renewed mobilization among his supporters, documented in Marcela Said's 2001 film I Love Pinochet. However, the discovery of Pinochet's offshore accounts in 2004 damaged his reputation among some former supporters who had valued his image of personal austerity.

=== Contemporary manifestations ===
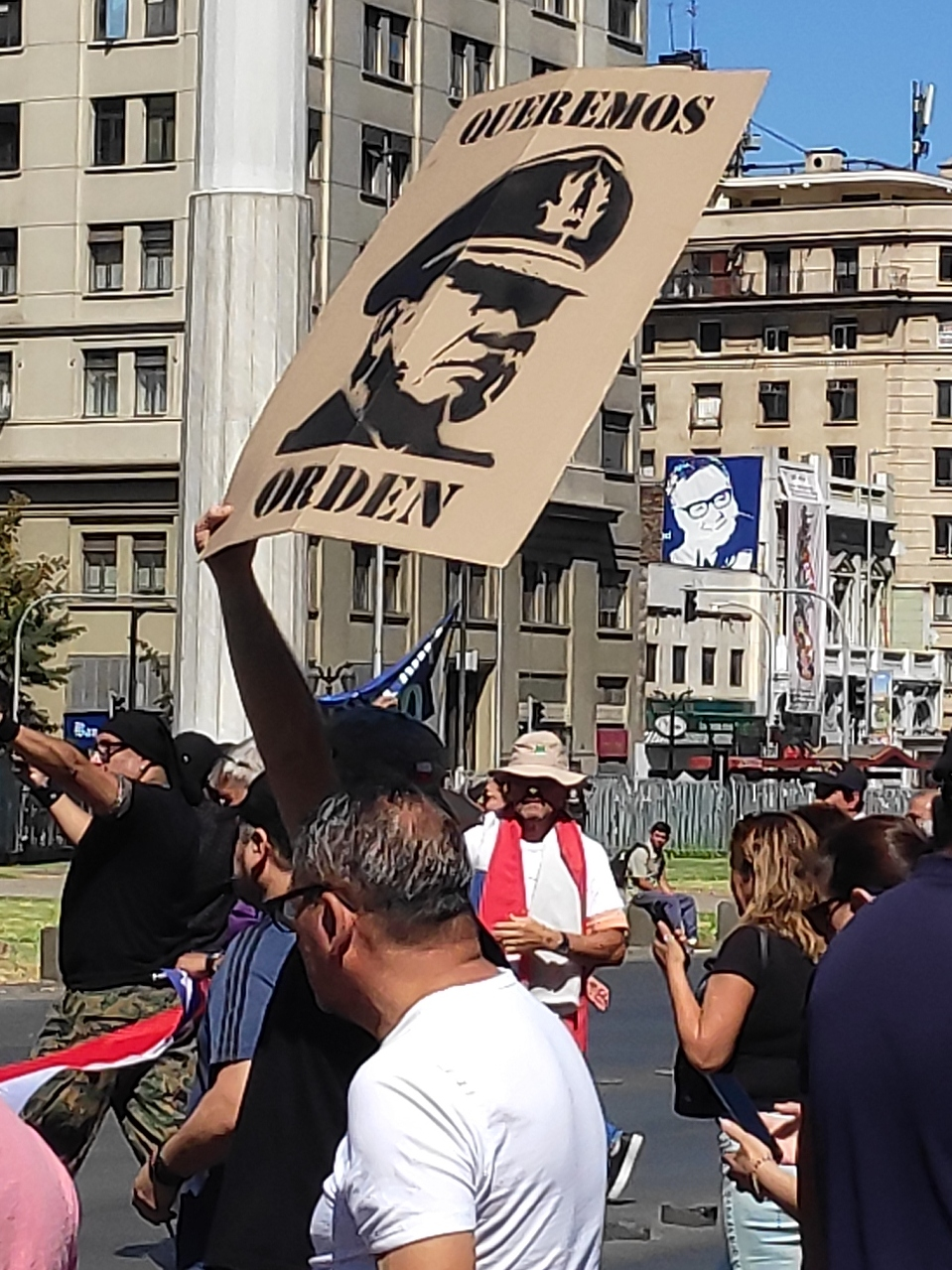
A supporter displays a Pinochet poster during political demonstrations in 2023.

In the 21st century, Pinochetism has experienced a resurgence through new political vehicles, most notably José Antonio Kast's Republican Party. Founded in 2019, the party represents what scholars have termed "organic Pinochetism," combining the ideology's traditional elements with contemporary right-wing populism. This revival has occurred alongside increased public sympathy for the dictatorship, with one 2023 survey showing 36% of Chileans believing the military was justified in launching the 1973 coup, compared to 18% in 2013.

The international dimension of Pinochetism remains relevant, with figures like former Brazilian President Jair Bolsonaro openly expressing admiration for Pinochet's legacy.

== Political legacy and influence ==
Pinochetism has left a profound imprint on Chilean politics and society. Its economic model, despite controversy, established Chile as a regional exemplar of market-oriented reform. Politically, the ideology continues to influence Chilean right-wing politics through both institutional parties like UDI and newer movements like the Republican Party.

The ideology's persistence demonstrates the ongoing polarization surrounding Pinochet's legacy, with competing interpretations of the dictatorship as either a necessary defense against communism or an unacceptable violation of human rights. This division continues to shape Chilean political discourse and historical memory.

== See also ==
- Chicago Boys
- Francoist influence in Chile
- Gremialismo
- Miracle of Chile
- Negationism of the military dictatorship of Chile

=== Similar ideologies ===
- Bolsonarism
- Cartismo
- Dutertismo
- Francoism
- Fujimorism
- Orbanism
- Peronism
- Thatcherism
- Trumpism

== Bibliography ==
- Valdes, Juan Gabriel (17 August 1995). Pinochet's Economists: The Chicago School of Economics in Chile. Cambridge University Press. ISBN 978-0-521-45146-8.
