= Quintus of Phrygia =

Saint Quintus of Phrygia
- Born: Phrygia (modern-day Turkey)
- Died: ~285 AD
- Venerated in: Roman Catholic Church
- Feast: 2 March

Quintus (Cointus) the Wonder-Worker (Greek: Κόϊντος Ομολογητής και Θαυματουργός, Kóïntos Omologêtếs kai Taumatourgós) (died ca. 285) is a saint and thaumaturge of the Eastern Orthodox Church. His feast day is 2 March. He is considered a martyr for the tortures he endured, though he did not die from them. A native of Phrygia, he was born to a Christian family. He worked with the poor at Aeolia. At Cyme, the governor, Rufus, ordered Quintus to sacrifice to the Roman gods, in accordance with the decree of Aurelian. However, Quintus freed Rufus when the latter was possessed by demons. An earthquake also pulled down the statues and temple of the pagan idols. Quintus was thus released.

However, after forty days, he was arrested again by the magistrate Clearchus. Quintus was tortured but recovered from his wounds and continued his ministry for many years after.
