= Saint Acestes =

Catholic saint

- Died: 1st century Rome, Italy
- Feast: 2 July

Saint Acestes was one of three soldiers who escorted Paul the Apostle to his death, who was later venerated by the pre-congregation.

== History ==
Not much is known about Acestes, but he is known to have been one of the three soldiers who escorted Paul to Rome, where he was martyred. The three soldiers who escorted Paul were also converted by him.

After witnessing Paul being martyred, the three soldiers declared their faith to the crowd. Consequently, they were beheaded.

== See also ==
- Pre-Congregation of the Catholic Church
