= Quemados case =

1986 attack on protestors in Chile

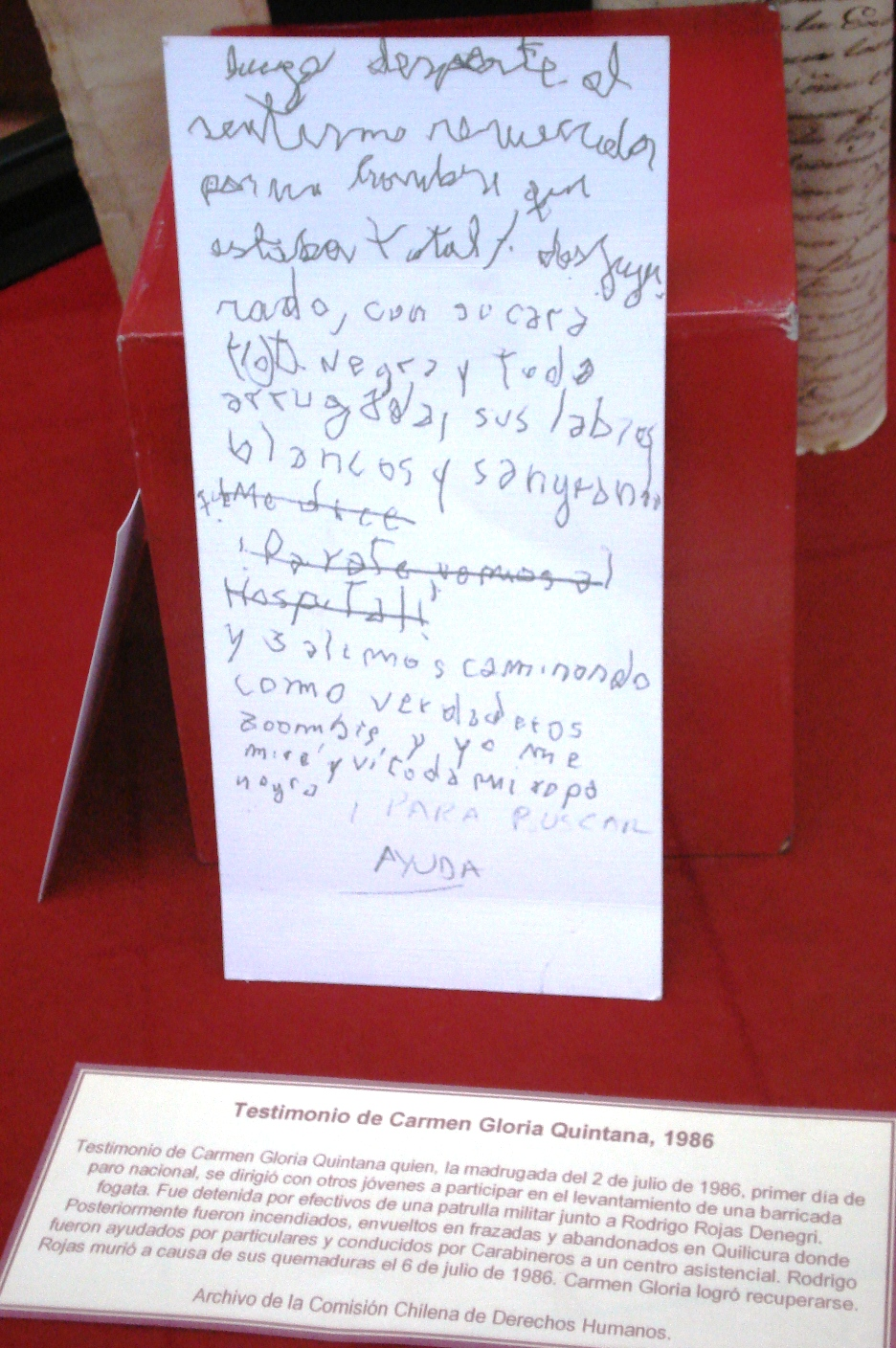
- Location: Santiago, Chile
- Date: 2 July 1986
- Attack type: Attack with fire
- Weapons: Tires and gasoline
- Deaths: Rodrigo Rojas de Negri
- Injuries: Carmen Gloria Quintana
- Perpetrator: Pedro Fernández Dittus

Quemados case (Spanish: Caso Quemados) is the name given to the attack against two protesters by an army patrol on 2 July 1986 in Santiago, Chile during manifestations against the military dictatorship of Augusto Pinochet.

A group of soldiers led by Pedro Fernández Dittus, that was patrolling the streets during the Days of National Protest stopped, hit and after wetting them with a flammable liquid, lit on fire two young people: Carmen Gloria Quintana and the photographer Rodrigo Rojas de Negri. After the attack, the victims were transferred to a remote site in the Quilicura commune on the outskirts of the city. Rojas died of his burns while Carmen survived, but with heavy burns. Due to the cruelty of the crime and the absurd judicial process associated with it the event received widespread attention and provoked protests in Chile and on an international level.

== The events ==
The opposition to Augusto Pinochet had great hopes that 1986 would be "The Year of Victory" and scheduled a series of Days of National Protest (Jornadas de Protesta Nacional) that were to be combined with a national strike on 2 and 3 July. In almost every town, opposition political groups prepared themselves. The government's response was to send the military to patrol the streets.

In the neighborhood of Los Nogales, in the commune of Estación Central of Santiago, a small group of people was setting up barricades in a strategic sector, during the morning of 2 July. Photographer Rodrigo Rojas de Negri, who provided services for an international agency that covered the strike, was following the group. At 8 in the morning the group of the protestors were intercepted on the corner of the General Velásquez Avenue and Germán Yungue Street by a military patrol under the command of Pedro Fernández Dittus and made up of 3 civilians, 5 non-commissioned officers and 17 soldiers. Most of the young protestors managed to escape, except Quintana and Rojas de Negri.

The soldiers doused the detainees with gasoline and set them on fire. With both youths on fire and unconscious, they were wrapped them in blankets, and loaded them into a military vehicle which took them to an isolated road, about 20 kilometers from the capital. Once there, they threw them into an irrigation ditch, assuming they would die. Later they were found by agricultural workers and taken to the Central Post Office for treatment.

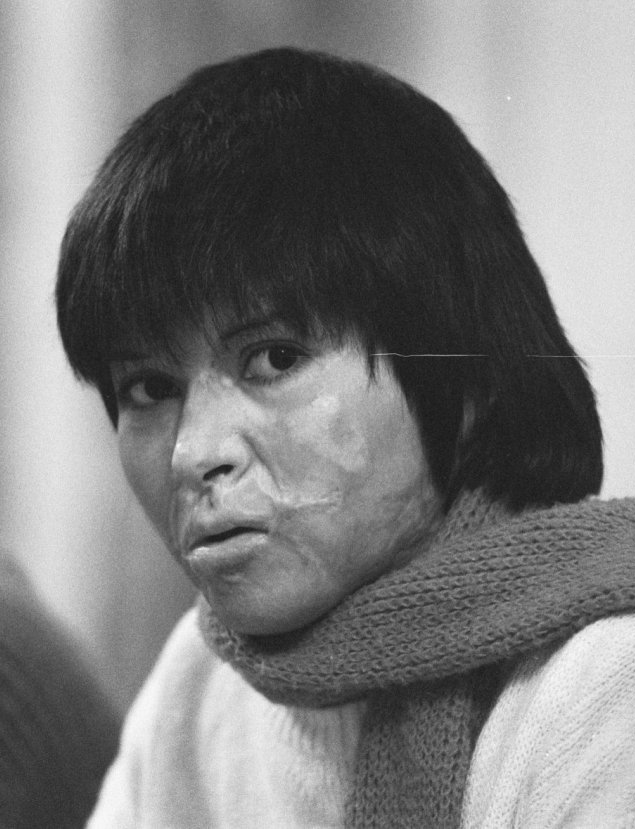
Carmen Gloria Quintana on 10 November 1987.

Rojas de Negri died four days later due to his injuries but Quintana was transferred to the Workers' Hospital on 6 July. Despite the second and third degree burns she suffered on 62% of her body, with many broken teeth (transiting between life and death for weeks), she ultimately survived. She then underwent extensive medical treatment in Chile and Canada, but she still retains a partially disfigured face as a result of her burns and scars.

== Judicial process ==
Although the official press and government pressure firstly tried to deny the crime, the claims from foreign governments and human rights organizations lead to the judicial examination of the case with judge Alberto Echavarría Lorca being appointed to investigate. On the 23rd day of the trial the facts who on the 23rd ruled: a) that Rodrigo Rojas de Negri and Carmen Quintana Arancibia were detained on the 2nd of this month by a military patrol that ensured the free movement of vehicles, temporarily holding them at the place of their arrest, one next to the other and close to easily flammable elements. Combustion occurred due to a movement of the young woman and the fall and breakage of the container of one of those elements, causing serious burns to both of them and subsequently causing the death of the first; and b) that no provision was made for the immediate medical attention of those affected, but rather that they were released after a few moments in a place and in conditions not conducive to obtaining such care. As a result, the judge decided to release the soldiers involved. According to Amnesty International's report that year, witnesses and victims' lawyers received death threats (three witnesses had to leave the country).

In the face of criticism and pressure, a military court on 3 January 1991 only found officer Fernández Dittus guilty of negligence for denying Rojas medical assistance, but exonerated him of any responsibility in the incineration of Quintana.

It would only be in 1993, when the Supreme Court sentenced Fernández Dittus to 600 days in prison for his responsibility in the death from burns of Rojas de Negri and the serious burns received by Quintana. In October 2000, a court ordered that the Chilean State pay 251.7 million pesos to Carmen Gloria Quintana (about US$500,000) in compensation.

=== Reopening of the case in 2015 ===
In July 2015, Minister Mario Carroza issued seven arrest warrants against military officials involved in the case. The appearance of Fernando Guzmán Espíndola, as a key witness, who was one of the conscripts of the military patrol, provided the key background to advance in the resolution of the case, indicating that it was Lieutenant Julio Castañer González who gave the order for the crime. The witness acknowledged that, at that time, he had been pressured to give a false statement to the military justice system.

In March 2019, Minister Carroza convicted eleven retired military personnel for the crimes of qualified homicide, for the case of Rodrigo Rojas de Negri, and qualified homicide in the degree of frustration, for the case of Carmen Gloria Quintana. The sentence convicted Julio Ernesto Castañer González, Iván Humberto Figueroa Canobra and Nelson Fidel Medina Gálvez as perpetrators to ten years and one day in prison. While Luis Alberto Zúñiga González, Jorge Osvaldo Astorga Espinoza, Francisco Fernando Vásquez Vergara, Leonardo Antonio Riquelme Alarcón, Walter Ronny Lara Gutiérrez, Juan Ramón González Carrasco, Pedro Patricio Franco Rivas and Sergio Hernández Ávila were sentenced as accomplices to a three-year sentence and a day in prison, with the benefit of supervised release.

In March 2022, the Court of Appeals of Santiago modified the sentence to increase the sentences imposed on those convicted. In relation to the perpetrators of the crimes, the sentences were modified to twenty years in prison. Meanwhile, the Court rejected the exception of res judicata that had acquitted Pedro Fernández Dittus in the first instance, who was also convicted as the author. The sentence also acquitted Luis Zúñiga González, Jorge Astorga Espinoza and Sergio Hernández Ávila.
