= Carmen Gloria Quintana =

Chilean democracy activist (born 1967)

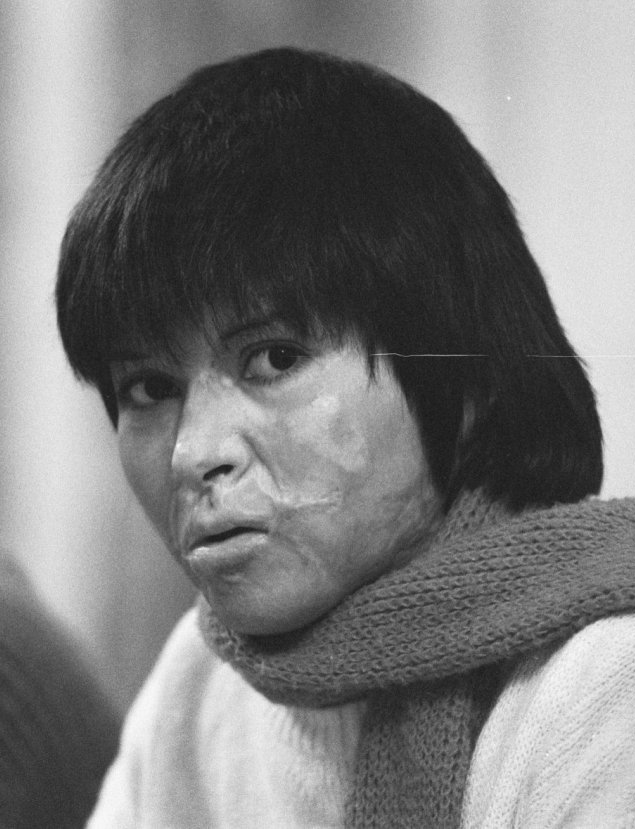
- Quintana in 1987
- Born: October 3, 1967 (age 59); Santiago, Chile

Carmen Gloria Quintana Arancibia (born 3 October 1967) is a Chilean woman who suffered severe burns in an incident where she and other young people were detained by an army patrol during a street demonstration against the dictatorship of Augusto Pinochet. She survived, and thereafter became a symbol of hope for democracy in Chile to many, receiving an embrace and encouragement from Pope John Paul II.

== Events ==
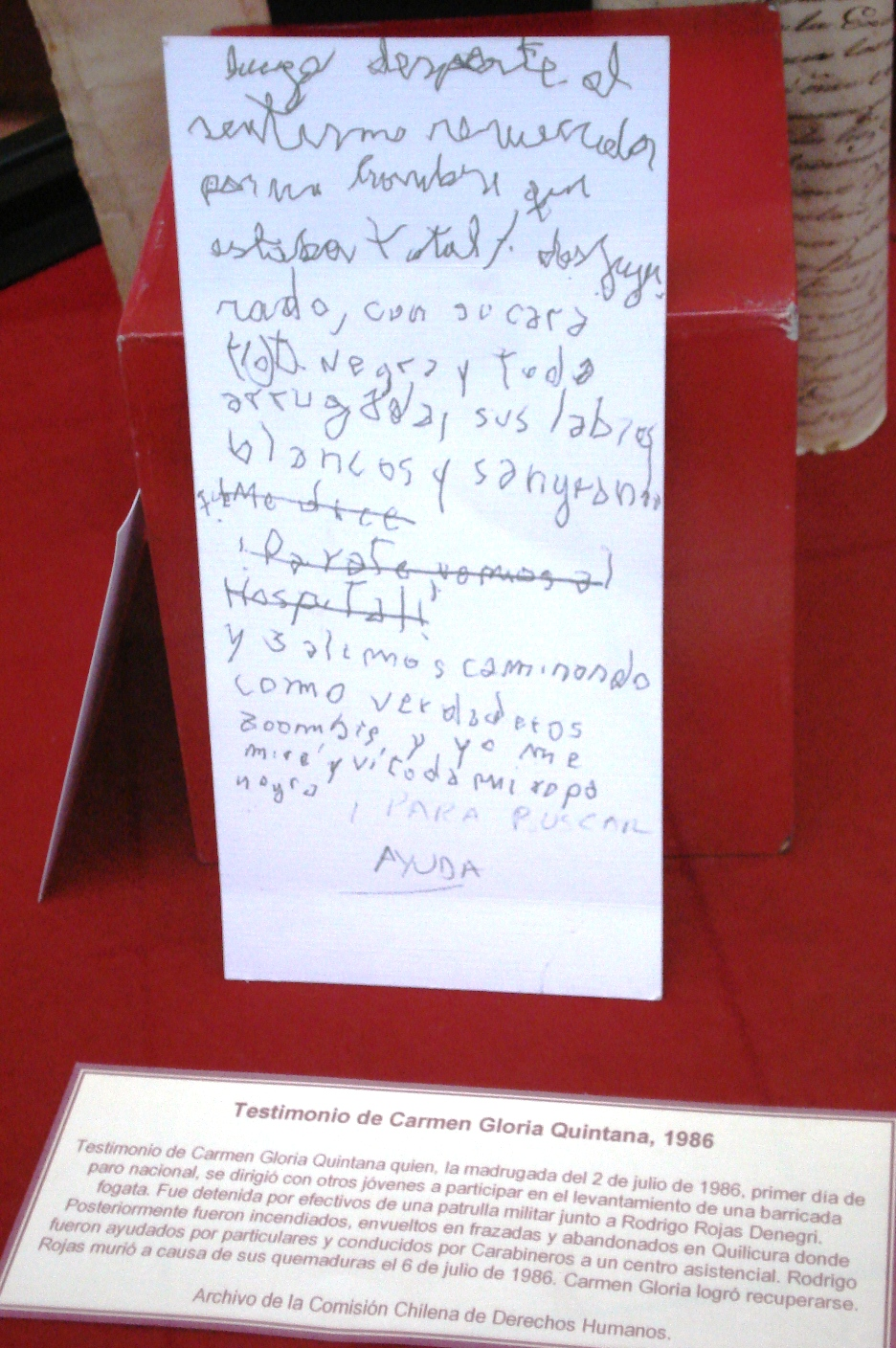
First testimony of Carmen Gloria Quintana. Collection of the National Archives of Chile.

On 2 July 1986, at 8 a.m., she was part of a small group of people preparing a barricade in Los Nogales, part of the district of Estación Central in Santiago. That day a national protest was taking place against the military dictatorship of General Pinochet. The group were carrying five used car tires and kerosene to create a barricade. They were intercepted by a military patrol that was engaged in demolishing barricades in the area of Avenida General Velásquez. All of the group managed to escape except Quintana and Rodrigo Rojas De Negri, a young photographer. The patrol, under the command of Lieutenant Pedro Fernández Dittus, was composed of three officers, five non-commissioned officers, and 17 soldiers.

Rojas was severely beaten by military personnel, while Quintana was searched. The military personnel used the kerosene the protestors had been carrying, soaked them with it, and then set on fire. Afterwards, the patrol members wrapped them in blankets, loaded them into a military vehicle and drove them to an isolated road in the outskirts of Santiago, over 20 kilometers away. There, in a dry irrigation ditch, they were dumped and left to die. However, Rojas De Negri and Quintana had regained consciousness and walked to a nearby highway to get help. Once at the highway, they unsuccessfully tried to hitchhike. Eventually a police patrol stopped, but both victims hesitated to let them know the military had attacked them for fear of being killed. After some time, the police took them to a public hospital.

Quintana and Rojas were later transferred to another hospital, but Rojas died from his injuries four days later. Despite the second and third degree burns that Quintana suffered on 62% of her body, with many teeth broken – she was in a critical condition for several weeks – she survived. She was given extensive medical treatment in Chile and in Canada, but still bears disfiguring scars as a result of her burns.

== Aftermath ==
In 1987, Pope John Paul II visited Chile, and Carmen Gloria Quintana met him while he was in Santiago.

On 3 January 1991, a military tribunal passed judgement on the case. The military patrol claimed that, as Quintana and Rojas were arrested, some of the Molotov cocktails they were carrying broke, setting them on fire accidentally. The military accepted this version and found Fernández Dittus guilty of negligence for having failed to get medical help for Rojas, but he was cleared of any responsibility for the burning of Quintana. In 1993 the Supreme Court of Chile sentenced Fernández Dittus to 600 days in prison for his responsibility in the burning death of Rojas De Negri and the serious burns sustained by Quintana.

In July 2015, an ex-soldier of the Chilean army came forward and testified there was a pact of silence in the Chilean military to cover up the immolation of Quintana and Rojas. As a result, a homicide investigation was opened against seven retired members of the Chilean military, all of whom were detained.

In November 2017, Quintana's family sued the state for 1,950 million Chilean pesos (approx. 3,000,000 USD) as compensatory damages.

In March 2019, three retired soldiers were found guilty of murder and attempted murder and sentenced to ten years imprisonment. Eight other former soldiers received three-year sentences for acting as accomplices in the attack.

== Current life ==
Quintana worked on the teaching staff of the School of Psychology of the Andres Bello University in Viña del Mar. Her teaching post deals specifically with the treatment of children and adolescents. She worked for many years at the Gustavo Fricke Hospital in Valparaíso and works with SENAME, the national Chilean organisation for the protection of the rights of minors and adolescents. In 2010, she emigrated to Canada to pursue a doctorate (PhD) in psychology at the University of Montreal and serves as scientific attaché at the Embassy of Chile in Canada.

== See also ==
- Chile under Pinochet
- Chilean political scandals
