= Monegundis =

Christian saint (died 570 AD)

Saint Monegundis
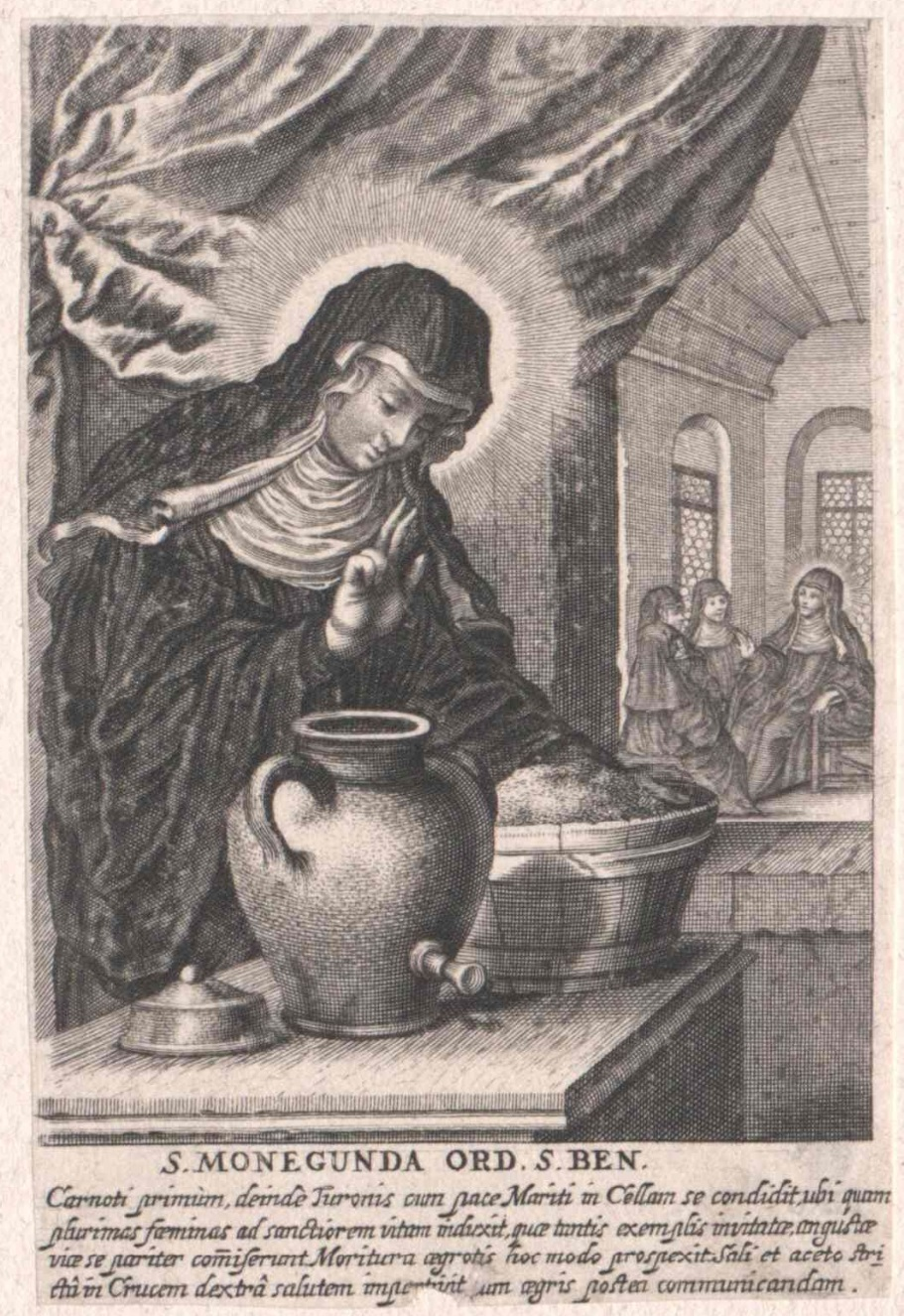
- Monegundis blessing oil and salt (18th c.)

Anchorite, Abbess
- Born: Chartres, France
- Died: 570 AD 2 July
- Venerated in: Roman Catholic Church; Eastern Orthodox Church
- Feast: 2 July (dies natalis)

Monegundis (also Monegund, Mongon, Molmadund, died 570 AD) was a Frankish hermit and saint. She has been called "a holy recluse". She married and had two daughters, who both died in childhood. Deeply depressed and overcome with grief, she left her husband and became an anchorite in a small cell, living off bread and water. Her fame grew as she performed miracles and became "a leader of a local community of worshippers and attracted those who needed assistance through her gifts of physical healing". She moved to Tours "with her husband's permission", near the shrine and basilica of St. Martin of Tours. Over time, her fame grew there as well, and other women joined her to also become anchorites; eventually, they built a convent there, called St. Pierre-le-Puellier. Her biography was written by hagiographer Gregory of Tours, who was acquainted with her personally, in his De Vita Patrum (The Life of the Fathers, 570). Monegundis allegedly performed many miracles during her lifetime and after her death. She died in about 570. Her feast day is 2 July.

== Life ==
Monegundis was a native of Chartres, France, and married, "as her parents wished". She had two daughters, who both died in childhood from a fever. She became deeply depressed and overcome with grief; as Mongundis' biographer, bishop and hagiographer Gregory of Tours, put it, "no one, not even her husband or friends, could console her". She left her husband and became a hermit; Gregory portrays her "as an exemplary type of the married woman who, with her husband's support, turned the bitter disappointment of her children's death into a source of spiritual nourishment for others". While some sources state that she became an anchorite with her husband's consent and with his permission, McNamara states that "her husband had enough to support her in a life of service with a handful of followers" and that "turning with contempt from the world and spurning the company of her husband, she devoted all her time to God alone, placing all her faith in Him, pouring out prayers for her own sins and those of the people".

According to McNamara, Monegundis became a leader of a local community of worshippers, attracting people seeking miraculous physical healings. She moved into a small cell, becoming an anchorite and a spiritual director to those who visited her. She lived on bread and water, provided by a hired maid, and slept on a small mat laid over a bench or on the floor. The bread she ate was made from barley flour that she prepared herself, in order to revive herself after fasting, and she gave the rest of the food in her house to the poor. At one point, her servant left her to starve. Gregory reports in his vita that the servant quit working for her without informing anyone, so no one brought Montgundis food or water for five days. After praying, she was able to get water from the snow outside her cell to drink and make her bread loaves.

Monegundis' fame grew, so she moved to Tours several years later. She was worried that "she might fall into vainglory" from the praise of her neighbors for her miracles, so she left her husband, her household, and her friends and family, and lived at the basilica of St. Martin of Tours. According to hagiographer Agnes Dunbar, her husband brought her back to Chartres, but she persuaded him to allow her to return to Tours. She and her followers built a hermitage near the tomb and basilica of Martin of Tours. Over time, her fame grew there as well, and other women joined her to also become anchorites; eventually, they built a convent there, called St. Pierre-le-Puellier. She was "untroubled" at the basilica, "for her husband asked nothing further from her". She ate only barley bread and drank a little wine on feast days.

Monegundis' biography was written by Gregory, who was acquainted with her personally, in his De Vita Patrum (The Life of the Fathers), written about 570. Her biography, according to McNamara, suggests that Martin of Tours' shrine "was a powerful magnet for the spiritual ambitious of the age". McNamara also states that Gregory's biographies of Monegundis and other local saints and devotees of Martin might have been part of Gregory's intention to emphasize their devotion to the local ecclesiastical authority and to Martin, thus fulfilling "Gregory's plan to secure the adhesion of local saints to the main body of the church". Historian Barbara H. Rosenwein notes that although Gregory titles his vita The Life of the Fathers, he features one woman, Monegundis, in it. Rosenwein states that he does this because of Monegundis' devotion to Martin, who was the patron saint of Gregory's diocese in Tours, and to present her as a model for other bishops. She also states, "Like a mirror reflecting a mirror, Monegundis became the focus of a cult, while she in turn was a pilgrim to Martin's tomb and a devotee of his relics".

Monegundis died of natural causes around 570. She was buried in the small cell where she lived. On her deathbed, the nuns with her wept, and when they asked who would heal the sick who came there for healing, she blessed oil and salt for them to use. Gregory reports that many were healed in this way. Monegundis' feast day is 2 July.

== Attributed miracles ==
Monegundis allegedly performed many miracles, at both Chartres and Tours, during her lifetime and after her death. Gregory reports that a woman, who was working on the roof overlooking the garden next to Montgundis' cell, "spied rudely" on her and became blind. After the woman confessed to her what had happened, Monegundis regretted that she was the reason the woman had gone blind, prayed, laid her hands on the woman, made the sign of the cross, and the woman was immediately healed. A man, who had lost his hearing, came to her for healing; she prostrated herself on the ground, and his hearing was restored. On her way to Tours, she entered a village named Esvres, where the relics of Médardus were kept. She prayed at the saint's vigil that evening. During Mass, a girl with a tumor lay at Monegundis' feet, begging her to heal her. Monegundis prostrated herself in prayer and then approached the girl, making the sign of the cross on the tumor; the wound burst open, the pus ran out, and the girl was healed.

According to Gregory, Monegundis "spent her time in daily prayer, fasting and vigils", and that "her miraculous power did not lack fame" in Tours. He also stated, "Nor was there any delay in the cures of all those whom the saint permitted to come to her". A widow's daughter, who had paralyzed hands, came to Monegundis and, after making the sign of the cross on them, massaged her hands, and they were healed. A woman brought her daughter, who was covered with sores and pus. Monegundis prayed, anointed the sores with her own saliva, and healed the girl. A neighborhood boy had been poisoned and was in great pain and could not eat or drink; despite her insistence that she could not heal him, his parents persisted, so she found the source of the pain on his belly, smeared a green leaf from a vine with her saliva, and put it on him with the sign of the cross. It eased his pain, and he was able to sleep; when he woke up, he was healed and left singing and thanking Monegundis. A paralyzed boy was brought to her, asking for healing. She prostrated herself in prayer, and getting up, took the boy's hand, raised him up, and sent him away healed. A blind woman was led to Monegundis and asked her to heal her. At first, Monegundis refused, directing the people to request that Martin heal the woman; they talked her into laying her hands on the woman, and the cataracts fell from the woman's eyes. Monegundis healed many people possessed by demons by laying her hands on them.

A deacon suffered from a swollen foot that prevented him from walking. He was brought to Monegundis' shrine; the oil she had blessed was put on his foot, and he was healed. A blind man who was led to her tomb prostrated himself in prayer there. He grew tired, fell asleep, and had a vision of her directing him to go to Martin's shrine for healing. When he woke up, one of his eyes had healed; he went to the shrine, and his other eye healed as well. A mute man prostrated himself before Monegundis' shrine, wept, and was healed when he stood up. Another mute man prostrated himself at her shrine and verbally requested that she heal him; the oil and salt she had blessed were poured into his mouth, and after blood and pus erupted from his mouth, he regained his ability to speak. A man with a fever came to her tomb and touched the cloth covering her body; his fever was abated, and he was cured. A paralyzed man named Marcus was carried to her shrine, where he prayed for a long time; after nine hours, he stood up and went home. A boy named Leodinus was sick for four months with a fever; he lost the ability to walk and to eat. He was carried to her shrine, was cured, and walked home. Gregory states, "Whoever was brought to the blessed woman's cell and crossed the holy threshold was restored to wholeness of mind", including those suffering from fevers and those possessed by demons.

== Works cited ==
- Dunbar, Agnes B.C. (1901). A Dictionary of Saintly Women. Vol. 2. London: George Bell & Sons. pp. 95–96.
- Gregory of Tours (1996). "Monegund, a Widow and Recluse of Tours in Gaul". In McNamara, Jo Ann; Halborg, John E.; Whatley, E. Gordon (eds.). Sainted Women of the Dark Ages. Translated by McNamara, Jo Ann. Duke University Press. pp. 51–59. ISBN 0-8223-1200-X.
- McNamara, Jo Ann (1996). "Monegund, Widow and Recluse of Tours (d. 570)". In McNamara, Jo Ann; Halborg, John E.; Whatley, E. Gordon (eds.). Sainted Women of the Dark Ages. Duke University Press. pp. 51–53. ISBN 0-8223-1200-X.
