= Rodrigo Rojas de Negri =

Chilean photographer; burned alive during anti-Pinochet demonstrations in 1986

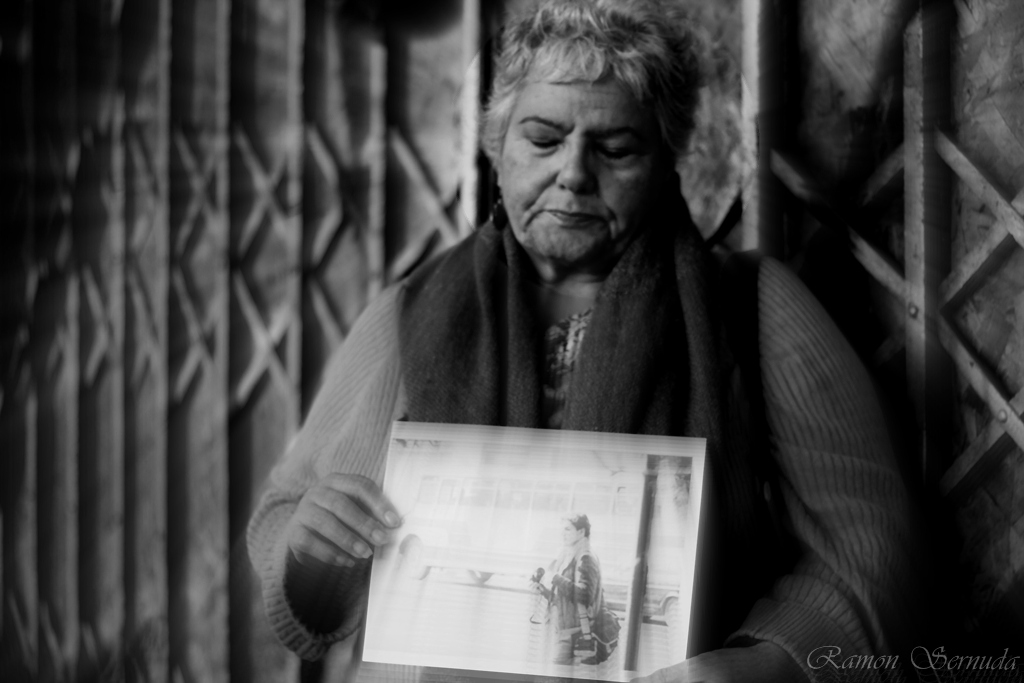
Verónica de Negri holding a photograph of her son Rodrigo

Rodrigo Andrés Rojas de Negri (7 March 1967 – 6 July 1986), known as Rodrigo Rojas, was a young photographer who was burned alive during a street demonstration against the dictatorship of General Augusto Pinochet in Chile.

== Background ==
Rodrigo Rojas was born in the port of Valparaíso, the son of Verónica de Negri, a communist party activist. In 1976 at the age of 10, and after the Chilean coup of 1973, he was sent to live with relatives in Canada. Soon thereafter, his mother was arrested for political activities against the government of General Augusto Pinochet and later exiled. They were reunited and settled in the Washington, D.C. area of the United States. There he attended Woodrow Wilson High School, and later studied photography. In 1986, Rojas, by then a young American photographer, decided to visit Chile for the first time since he had left for the exile.

== Events of the case ==
During this time Chile was experiencing widespread political instability and human rights abuses. A national protest was organized for 2–3 July 1986. Rojas, who had been in the country for only six weeks, decided to try to participate and document the barricades that were going up in different areas of Santiago.

At 8:00 am on 2 July 1986, he was among a small group of people that were setting up a barricade in the Los Nogales neighborhood, in the municipality of Estacion Central. According to the official report, endorsed and quoted at a speech by General Pinochet himself, the group was carrying five old tires, a molotov cocktail and a gallon of gasoline. They were intercepted by an army patrol that was clearing barricades in the area of General Velázquez Avenue. All escaped except for Rojas and Carmen Quintana, an engineering student at the University of Santiago. The patrol, under the command of Lieutenant Pedro Fernández Dittus, was composed of three officers, five noncommissioned officers, and 17 soldiers.

There are two versions of the succeeding events: the first, which was officially endorsed and quoted by Pinochet at a speech, states that as Quintana and Rojas were arrested by a military patrol, some of the molotov cocktails they were carrying broke, setting them on fire accidentally. The opposing version (of Quintana, the only survivor) alleges that both were severely beaten by military personnel, and later soaked with gasoline and set on fire.

After both were aflame and unconscious, patrol members wrapped them in blankets, loaded them into a military vehicle and drove them to an isolated road in the outskirts of Santiago, over 20 kilometers away. There, in an irrigation ditch, they were dumped and left to die. Some agricultural workers found them and notified the police, who then took them to a public hospital. Rojas' burns were fatal. He had second- and third-degree burns that covered 90% of his body, a broken mandible and broken ribs, and a collapsed lung. He lingered for four days after the incident, and died on 6 July 1986.

== Aftermath ==
The US ambassador to Chile at the time was unsuccessful at securing the transport of the severely injured Rojas to a better hospital before his death, which happened four days after the attack. His funeral in Santiago was attended by thousands, including the ambassador, and ended with the Chilean military tear-gassing the mourners. On 3 January 1991 a military court found Pedro Fernández Dittus guilty of negligence for failing to get medical attention for Rojas, but absolved him of any responsibility in the Quintana burning. Two years later, the Supreme Court sentenced Fernández Dittus to 600 days in prison for his responsibility in the burning death of Rojas de Negri and the serious burns sustained by Quintana. In October 2000 a court ordered the government to pay Quintana 251.7 million pesos (about US$500,000) in compensatory damages. In March 2019, three retired soldiers were found guilty of murder and attempted murder and sentenced to ten years imprisonment. Eight other former soldiers received three-year sentences for acting as accomplices in the attack.

On their 1987 album Remembrance Days, English alternative pop band The Dream Academy included the song "In Exile (For Rodrigo Rojas)" in honor of Rojas' death.

== See also ==
- Chile under Pinochet
- Chilean political scandals

== Sources ==
- Dreifus, Claudia. "Rodrigo's Last Trip Home.", Mother Jones (1987).
