= Patronato =

Patronato may refer to:

- Club Atlético Patronato, an Argentine football club
- Patronato real, an arrangement between the Vatican and the Kingdom of Spain
- Barrio Patronato, a barrio (district) in Santiago, Chile
- Patronato metro station of Santiago Metro
  - Patronato, Santa Maria, a district in Santa Maria, Rio Grande do Sul, Brazil
