= Demographics of Chile =

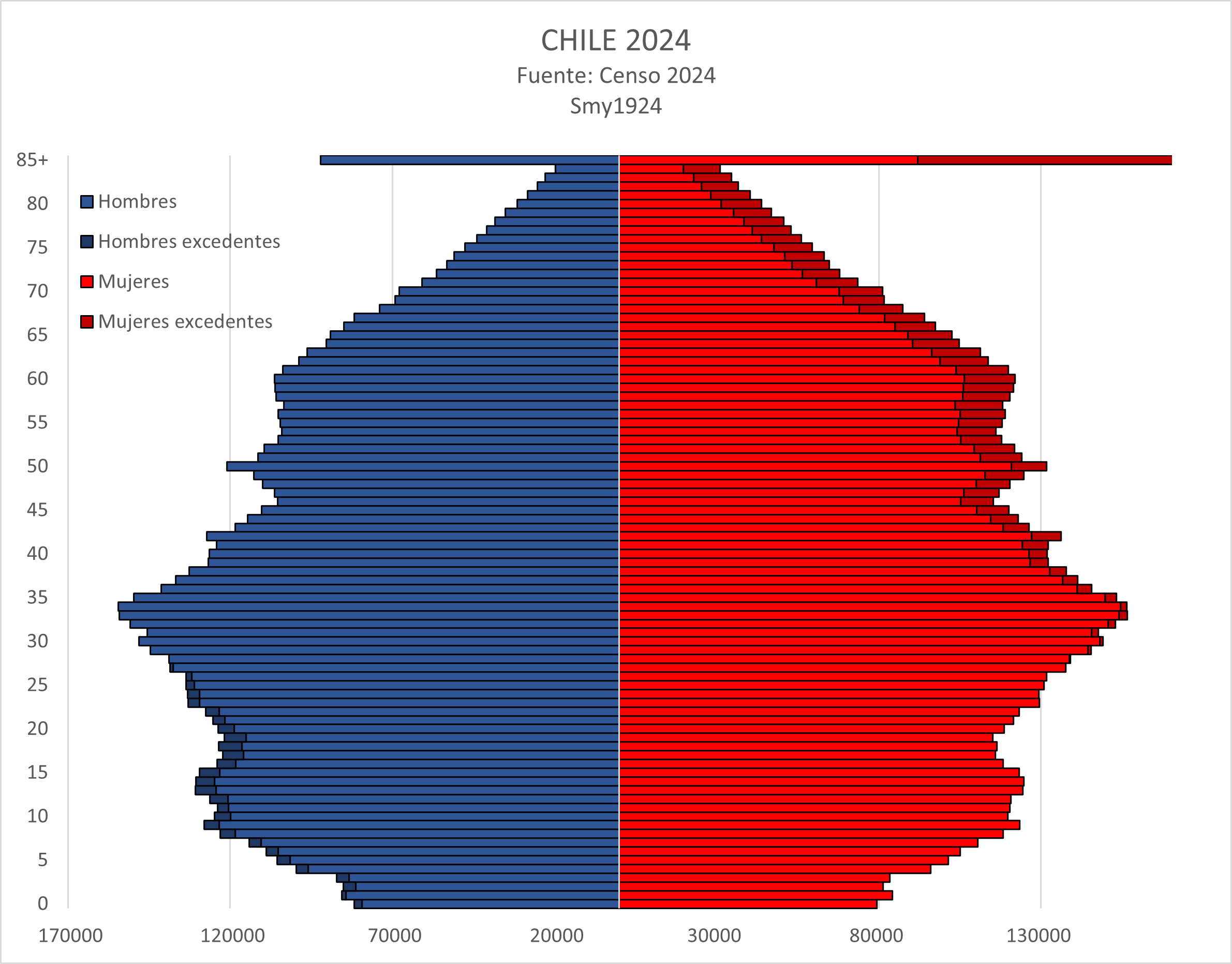
- Chile population pyramid in 2024
- Population: 19,493,184
- Growth rate: 0.61% (2024 est.)
- Birth rate: 12.4 births/1,000 population (2024 est.)
- Death rate: 6.6 deaths/1,000 population (2023 est.)
- Life expectancy: 80.3 years (2024 est.)
  - male: 77.3 years (2024 est.)
  - female: 83.3 years (2024 est.)
- Fertility rate: 0.99 children born/woman (2025)
- Infant mortality: 6.3 deaths/1,000 live births (2024 est.)
- Net migration rate: 0.3 migrant(s)/1,000 population (2024 est.)
- Immigrant share: 7.8% (2024)

Age structure
- 0–14 years: 19.2% (male 1,829,801/female 1,758,137) (2024 est.)
- 15–64 years: 67.3% (male 6,259,566/female 6,273,074) (2024 est.)
- 65 and over: 13.6% (male 1,024,692/female 1,404,187) (2024 est.)

Sex ratio
- Total: 0.97 male(s)/female (2024 est.)
- At birth: 1.04 male(s)/female (2024 est.)
- Under 15: 1.04 male(s)/female (2024 est.)
- 15–64 years: 1 male(s)/female (2024 est.)
- 65 and over: 0.73 male(s)/female (2024 est.)

Nationality
- Nationality: Chilean
- Major ethnic: White (N/D); Spanish (N/D); French (N/D); Arab (N/D); English (N/D); German (N/D); Others (N/D); Multiracial (N/D)
- Minor ethnic: Native (11.40%); Mapuche (8.78%); Aymara (0.97%); Diaguita (0.83%); Others (0.82%); Black (0.94%); Haitian (N/D); Others (N/D); East Asian (N/D); Chinese (N/D); Others (N/D)

Language
- Official: Spanish (de facto)
- Spoken: Languages of Chile

Chile's 2017 census reported a population of 17,574,003 people. Its rate of population growth has been decreasing since 1990, due to a declining birth rate. By 2050 the population is expected to reach approximately 20.2 million people, at which point it is projected to either stagnate or begin declining. About 85% of the country's population lives in urban areas, with 40% living in Greater Santiago alone. The largest agglomerations according to the 2002 census are Greater Santiago with 5.6 million people, Greater Concepción with 861,000 and Greater Valparaíso with 824,000.

According to the 2024 Census, the population of Chile was 18,480,432, meaning a growth of 5.2% since the 2017 Census, however, since the 2024 was a de jure census, growth between 2017 and 2024 can differ, according to the Chilean National Institute of Statistics, comparing both census by de jure results, the population growth between both censuses was 6.7%.

== Population size and structure ==
Census population
Year	Pop.	±% p.a.
1835	1,103,036	—
1843	1,083,701	−0.22%
1854	1,446,031	+2.66%
1865	1,819,223	+2.11%
1875	2,075,971	+1.33%
1885	2,527,320	+1.99%
1895	2,687,985	+0.62%
1907	3,249,279	+1.59%
1920	3,753,799	+1.12%
1930	4,287,445	+1.34%
1940	5,023,539	+1.60%
1952	5,932,995	+1.40%
1960	7,374,115	+2.76%
1970	8,884,768	+1.88%
1982	11,329,736	+2.05%
1992	13,348,401	+1.65%
2002	15,116,435	+1.25%
2012	16,634,603	+0.96%
2017	17,574,003	+1.10%
2024	18,480,432	+0.72%

According to the 2022 revision of the World Population Prospects the total population was 19,493,184 in 2021, compared to only 6,143,000 in 1950. The proportion of children below the age of 15 in 2015 was 20.1%, 69.0% was between 15 and 65 years of age, while 10.9% was 65 years or older.

Year	Total population ( × 1000)	Population percentage in age bracket		
Year	Total population ( × 1000)	0–14	15–64	65+
1950	6 143	36.7%	59.0%	4.3%
1955	6 862	38.1%	57.4%	4.5%
1960	7 696	39.4%	55.8%	4.8%
1965	8 612	40.4%	54.5%	5.0%
1970	9 562	39.6%	55.2%	5.2%
1975	10 421	36.9%	57.7%	5.4%
1980	11 234	33.0%	61.4%	5.7%
1985	12 109	30.6%	63.2%	6.2%
1990	13 141	29.3%	64.2%	6.5%
1995	14 194	28.2%	64.8%	7.0%
2000	15 170	26.5%	65.8%	7.7%
2005	16 097	24.0%	67.5%	8.5%
2010	17 015	21.9%	68.5%	9.6%
2015	17 948	20.1%	69.0%	10.9%
2020	19 116	19.2%	68.5%	12.2%

View source data.
View source data.
View source data.
View source data.

=== Structure of the population ===
Population Estimates by Sex and Age Group (01.VII.2013):

Age group	Male	Female	Total	%
Total	8 688 067	8 868 748	17 556 815	100
0–4	639 270	615 764	1 255 034	7.15
5–9	633 287	610 458	1 243 745	7.08
10–14	648 484	625 765	1 274 249	7.26
15–19	707 959	684 424	1 392 383	7.93
20–24	749 460	727,530	1 476 990	8.41
25–29	710 354	693 723	1 404 077	8.00
30–34	634 056	624 375	1 258 431	7.17
35–39	598 029	595 813	1 193 842	6.80
40–44	612 898	617 259	1 230 157	7.01
45–49	610 366	621 300	1 231 666	7.02
50–54	574 320	592 349	1 166 669	6.65
55–59	468 437	492 763	961 200	5.47
60–64	359 065	390 681	749 746	4.27
65–69	276 510	317 107	593 617	3.38
70–74	200 585	247 698	448 283	2.55
75–79	133 715	183 899	317 614	1.81
80+	131 272	227 840	359 112	2.05
Age group	Male	Female	Total	Percent
0–14	1 921 041	1 851 987	3 773 028	21.49
15–64	6 024 944	6 040 217	12 065 161	68.72
65+	742 082	976 544	1 718 626	9.79

Population Estimates by Sex and Age Group (30.VI.2021) (Post-censal estimates.):

Age group	Male	Female	Total	%
Total	9 708 512	9 969 851	19 678 363	100
0–4	600 632	578 263	1 178 895	5.99
5–9	651 336	627 814	1 279 150	6.50
10–14	655 232	632 388	1 287 620	6.54
15–19	631 851	610 954	1 242 805	6.32
20–24	719 079	697 050	1 416 129	7.20
25–29	827 115	802 756	1 629 871	8.28
30–34	842 111	817 367	1 659 478	8.43
35–39	738 934	722 171	1 461 105	7.42
40–44	683 807	678 365	1 362 172	6.92
45–49	644 339	651 942	1 296 281	6.59
50–54	602 079	622 931	1 225 010	6.23
55–59	566 471	601 133	1 167 604	5.93
60–64	483 184	530 360	1 013 544	5.15
65-69	393 552	450 783	844 335	4.29
70-74	278 885	336 455	615 340	3.13
75-79	184 713	246 241	430 954	2.19
80-84	113 029	174 032	287 061	1.46
85-89	59 048	109 156	168 204	0.85
90-94	26 017	57 951	83 968	0.43
95-99	6 154	17 742	23 896	0.12
100+	944	3 997	4 941	0.03
Age group	Male	Female	Total	Percent
0–14	1 907 200	1 838 465	3 745 665	19.03
15–64	6 738 970	6 735 029	13 473 999	68.47
65+	1 062 342	1 396 357	2 458 699	12.49

== Vital statistics ==
=== Official statistics ===
	Average population	Live births	Deaths	Natural change	Crude birth rate (per 1000)	Crude death rate (per 1000)	Natural change (per 1000)	Crude migration change (per 1000)	Total fertility rate
1932		149,459	119,664	29,795					
1933		147,733	118,432	29,301					
1934		130,362	119,078	11,284					
1935		153,151	112,364	40,787					
1936		156,917	114,392	42,525					
1937		153,354	109,795	43,559					
1938		154,927	113,719	41,208					
1939		163,589	114,141	49,448					
1940		166,593	107,771	58,822					
1941		165,004	100,091	64,913					
1942		170,222	104,122	66,100					
1943		172,095	103,235	68,860					
1944		174,864	103,054	71,810					
1945		178,292	107,064	71,228					
1946		175,685	93,547	82,138					
1947		186,784	92,481	94,303					
1948		189,236	97,670	91,566					
1949		189,719	103,384	86,335					
1950	6,081,000	206,582	91,180	115,402	34.0	15.0	19.0		
1951	6,218,000	209,794	92,728	117,066	33.7	14.9	18.8	3.2	
1952	6,354,000	225,758	81,966	143,792	35.5	12.9	22.6	-1.2	
1953	6,491,000	222,956	80,068	142,888	34.3	12.4	21.9	-0.8	
1954	6,627,000	220,968	84,519	136,449	33.3	12.8	20.5	0	
1955	6,764,000	237,213	87,843	149,370	35.1	13.0	22.1	-1.8	
1956	6,940,000	249,756	84,199	165,557	36.0	12.1	23.9	1.5	
1957	7,116,000	262,746	91,506	171,240	36.9	12.9	24.0	0.7	
1958	7,291,000	263,418	88,930	174,488	36.1	12.2	23.9	0.1	
1959	7,467,000	267,657	94,491	173,166	35.8	12.7	23.1	0.5	
1960	7,643,000	282,681	95,486	187,195	37.0	12.5	24.5	-1.5	
1961	7,843,000	290,412	91,348	199,064	37.0	11.6	25.4	0.1	
1962	8,044,000	304,930	94,874	210,056	37.9	11.8	26.1	-1.1	
1963	8,245,000	309,908	98,293	211,615	37.6	11.9	25.7	-1.3	
1964	8,445,000	306,050	94,058	211,992	36.2	11.1	25.1	-1.4	
1965	8,646,000	308,014	91,648	216,366	35.6	10.6	25.0	-1.8	
1966	8,831,000	295,761	95,450	200,311	33.5	10.8	22.7	-1.8	
1967	9,015,000	277,009	86,840	190,169	30.7	9.6	21.1	-0.7	
1968	9,200,000	273.296	84.433	188.863	29.7	9.2	20.5	-0.4	
1969	9,385,000	268.807	84.336	184.471	28.6	9	19.6	0.1	
1970	9,569,000	261,609	83,014	178,595	27.3	8.7	18.6	0.6	
1971	9,738,000	273,518	83,456	190,062	28.1	8.6	19.5	-2.2	
1972	9,907,000	277,891	87,429	190,462	28.0	8.8	19.2	-2.2	
1973	10,076,000	276,650	80,994	195,656	27.5	8.0	19.5	-2.7	
1974	10,244,000	267,977	78,493	189,484	26.2	7.7	18.5	-2.1	
1975	10,413,000	256,543	74,481	182,062	24.6	7.2	17.4	-1.3	
1976	10,565,000	247,722	80,537	167,185	23.4	7.6	15.8	-1.5	
1977	10,717,000	240,463	73,446	167,017	22.4	6.8	15.6	-1.4	
1978	10,869,000	236,780	72,436	164,344	21.8	6.7	15.1	-1.2	
1979	11,021,000	241,077	74,528	166,549	21.9	6.8	15.1	-1.3	
1980	11,174,000	247,013	74,109	172,904	22.1	6.6	15.5	-1.8	
1981	11,359,000	264,809	69,971	194,838	23.3	6.2	17.1	-0.9	
1982	11,545,000	270,003	69,887	200,116	23.4	6.1	17.3	-1.2	
1983	11,731,000	256,539	74,296	182,243	21.9	6.3	15.6	0.3	
1984	11,916,000	265,016	74,669	190,347	22.2	6.3	15.9	-0.5	
1985	12,047,000	261,978	73,534	188,444	21.7	6.1	15.6	-4.8	
1986	12,248,000	272,997	72,209	200,788	22.3	5.9	16.4	0	
1987	12,454,000	279,762	70,559	209,203	22.5	5.7	16.8	-0.3	
1988	12,667,000	296,581	74,435	222,146	23.4	5.9	17.5	-0.7	
1989	12,883,000	303,798	75,453	228,345	23.6	5.9	17.7	-1.0	
1990	13,179,000	307,522	78,434	229,118	23.3	6.0	17.3	5.2	
1991	13,422,000	299,456	74,862	224,594	22.3	5.6	16.7	1.4	
1992	13,665,000	293,787	74,090	219,697	21.5	5.4	16.1	1.7	2.54
1993	13,908,000	290,438	76,261	214,177	20.9	5.5	15.4	2,1	2.48
1994	14,152,000	288,175	75,445	212,730	20.4	5.3	15.1	2,2	2.36
1995	14,395,000	279,928	78,517	201,411	19.4	5.5	13.9	2.9	2.28
1996	14,596,000	278,729	79,123	199,606	19.1	5.4	13.7	0.1	2.26
1997	14,796,000	273,641	78,472	195,169	18.5	5.3	13.2	0.3	2.21
1998	14,997,000	270,637	80,257	190,380	18.0	5.4	12.6	0.7	2.17
1999	15,197,000	263,867	81,984	181,883	17.4	5.4	12.0	1.2	2.11
2000	15,398,000	261,993	78,814	183,179	17.0	5.1	11.9	1.2	2.09
2001	15,572,000	259,069	81,871	177,198	16.6	5.3	11.3	-0.2	2.05
2002	15,746,000	251,559	81,080	170,479	16.0	5.1	10.9	0.2	1.99
2003	15,919,000	246,827	83,672	163,155	15.5	5.3	10.2	0.6	1.94
2004	16,093,000	242,476	86,138	156,338	15.1	5.4	9.7	1.1	1.90
2005	16,267,000	242,980	86,102	156,878	14.9	5.3	9.6	1.1	1.89
2006	16,433,000	243,561	85,639	157,922	14.8	5.2	9.6	0.5	1.88
2007	16,598,000	242,054	93,000	149,054	14.6	5.6	9.0	1.0	1.94
2008	16,763,000	248,366	90,168	158,198	14.8	5.4	9.4	0.4	1.97
2009	16,929,000	253,584	91,965	161,619	15.0	5.4	9.6	0.3	2.00
2010	17,094,000	251,199	97,930	153,269	14.7	5.7	9.0	0.7	1.97
2011	17,248,000^{1}	247,358	94,985	152,373	14.4	5.5	8.9	0.1	1.94
2012	17,445,000	243,635	98,711	144,924	14.0	5.7	8.3	3.0	1.90
2013	17,612,000	242,862	99,770	143,092	13.8	5.7	8.1	1.4	1.85
2014	17,787,000	252,194	101,960	150,234	14.2	5.7	8.5	1.4	1.91
2015	17,971,000	245,406	103,327	142,079	13.6	5.7	7.9	2.4	1.86
2016	18,167,000	232,616	104,026	128,590	12.8	5.7	7.1	3.8	1.75
2017	18,419,192	219,494	106,388	113,106	11.9	5.8	6.1	7.7	1.65
2018	18,751,405	221,724	106,786	114,938	11.8	5.7	6.1	11.8	1.62
2019	19,040,037	210,188	109,658	100,530	11.0	5.7	5.3	13.5	1.50
2020	19,235,540	194,978	126,169	68,809	10.0	6.5	3.5	14.8	1.30
2021	19,391,613	177,273	137,629	39,644	9.0	6.9	2.1	9.3	1.17
2022	19,581,575	189,310	136,958	52,352	9.6	6.8	2.8	5.0	1.32
2023	19,756,365	173,920	121,270	52,650	8.7	6.0	2.7	4.1	1.16
2024	19,904,328	154,441	126,883	27,558	7.7	6.3	1.4		1.03
2025	20,036,669	146,446	126,428	20,018	7.1	6.2	0.9		0.99

^{1}This estimate and those of previous years were made before the 2012 census results were known.

(p) = preliminary figures.| 2020^{1}

=== Current vital statistics ===
The Ine publishes monthly the vital statistics report. The final number of births and deaths tend to be revised up by the Chilean office of statistics.

Period	Live births	Deaths	Natural increase
January—August 2025	97,837	84,673	+13,164
January—August 2026	98,851	85,064	+13,787
Difference	▲ +1,014 (+1.04%)	▲ +391 (+0.46%)	▲ +623

=== Total fertility rate ===
==== By region ====
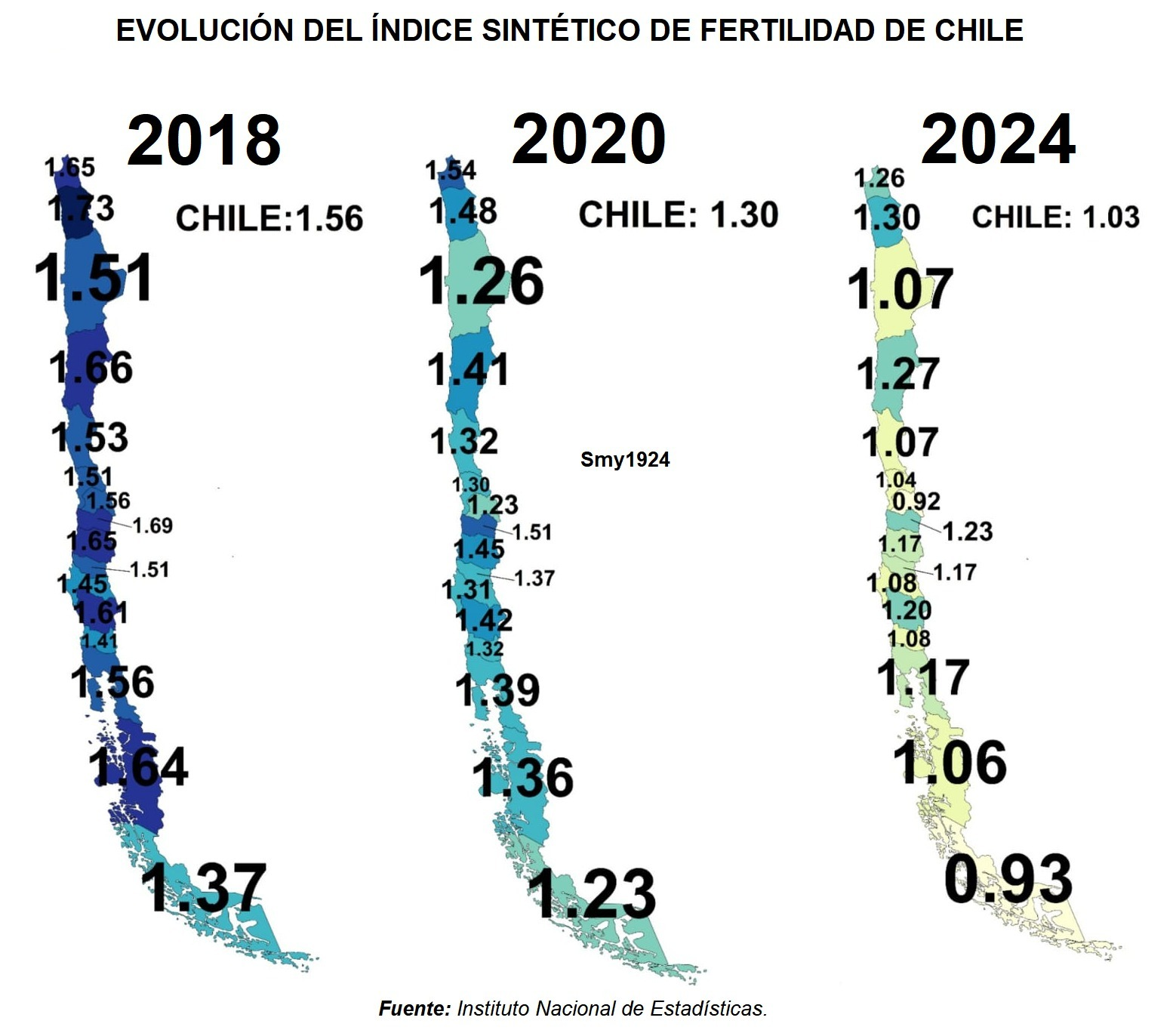
2018; 2020; 2024.

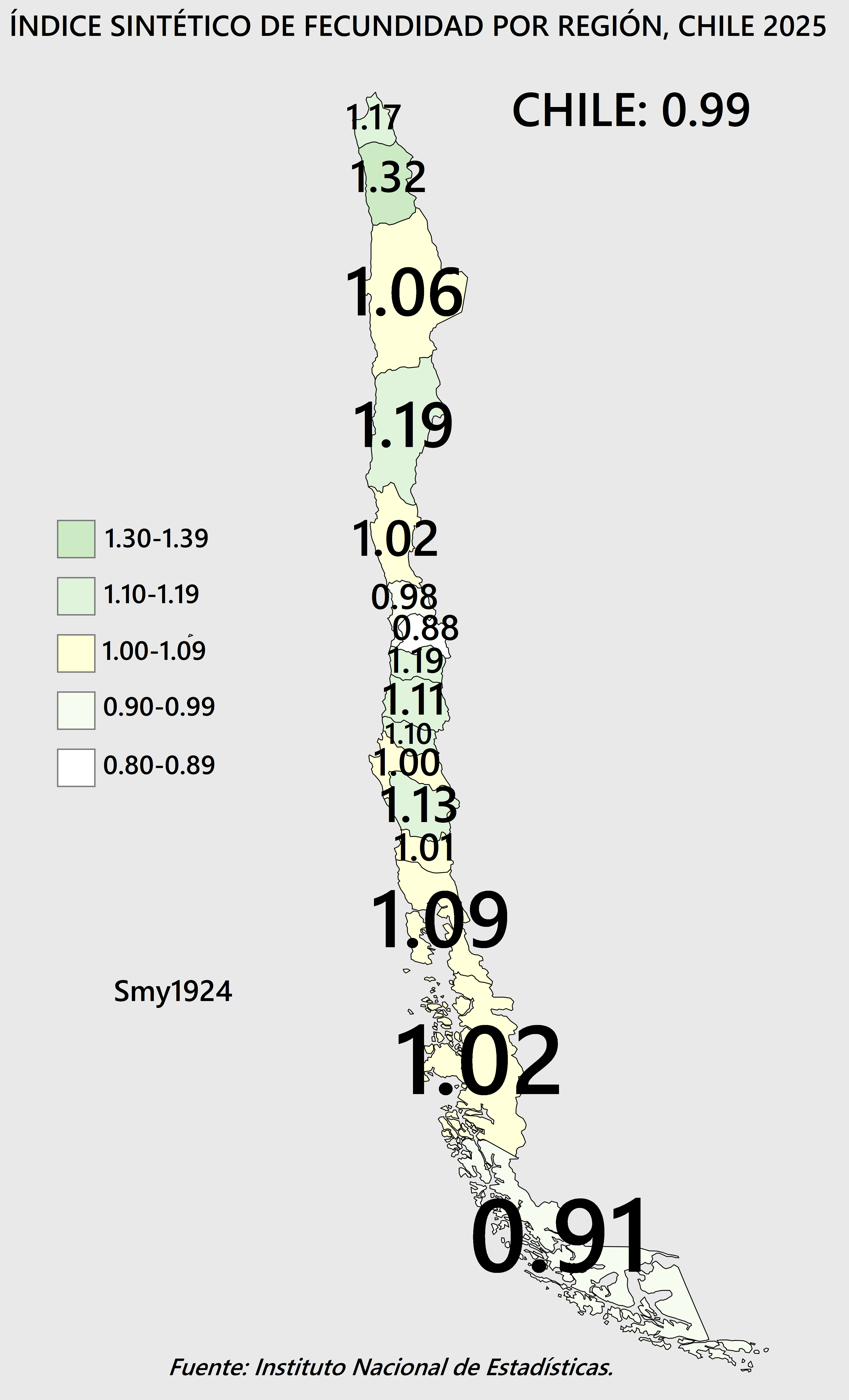
2025.

2025pr
Region	TFR
Tarapacá	1.32
Atacama	1.19
O'Higgins	1.19
Arica and Parinacota	1.17
Araucanía	1.13
Maule	1.11
Ñuble	1.10
Los Lagos	1.09
Antofagasta	1.06
Coquimbo	1.02
Aysén	1.02
Los Ríos	1.01
Biobío	1.00
Chile	0.99
Valparaíso	0.98
Magallanes	0.91
Metropolitan	0.88

==== Before 1950 ====
Years	1900	1901	1902	1903	1904	1905	1906	1907	1908	1909
Total Fertility Rate in Chile	5.11	5.72	6.34	6.30	6.25	6.21	6.17	6.12	6.13	6.14

Years	1910	1911	1912	1913	1914	1915	1916	1917	1918	1919
Total Fertility Rate in Chile	6.15	6.16	6.16	6.08	6.00	5.92	5.84	5.76	5.75	5.73

Years	1920	1921	1922	1923	1924	1925	1926	1927	1928	1929
Total Fertility Rate in Chile	5.71	5.70	5.68	5.67	5.65	5.64	5.63	5.61	5.58	5.54

Years	1930	1931	1932	1933	1934	1935	1936	1937	1938	1939
Total Fertility Rate in Chile	5.50	5.46	5.43	5.32	5.22	5.11	5.01	4.90	4.90	4.89

Years	1940	1941	1942	1943	1944	1945	1946	1947	1948	1949
Total Fertility Rate in Chile	4.89	4.88	4.88	4.86	4.84	4.82	4.80	4.78	4.73	4.67

=== United Nations estimates ===
The Population Department of the United Nations prepared the following estimates.

Period	Live births per year	Deaths per year	Natural change per year	CBR*	CDR*	NC*	TFR*	IMR*	Life expectancy		
Period	Live births per year	Deaths per year	Natural change per year	CBR*	CDR*	NC*	TFR*	IMR*	total	males	females
1950–1955	244,000	94,000	150,000	37.5	14.5	23.0	5.15	120	54.9	52.9	56.8
1955–1960	268,000	95,000	173,000	36.8	13.1	23.7	5.18	118	56.2	53.8	58.7
1960–1965	285,000	95,000	190,000	35.0	11.6	23.4	4.96	109	58.1	55.3	61.0
1965–1970	291,000	93,000	198,000	32.1	10.2	21.9	4.46	89	60.8	57.7	63.9
1970–1975	271,000	88,000	183,000	27.1	8.8	18.3	3.57	69	63.7	60.6	67.0
1975–1980	257,000	84,000	173,000	23.8	7.8	16.0	2.93	45	67.4	64.0	70.8
1980–1985	265,000	82,000	183,000	22.7	7.1	15.6	2.66	24	70.9	67.4	74.4
1985–1990	286,000	81,000	205,000	22.7	6.4	16.3	2.60	18	72.8	69.6	76.0
1990–1995	278,000	80,000	198,000	20.4	5.9	14.5	2.38	14	74.5	71.5	77.4
1995–2000	261,000	80,000	181,000	17.8	5.5	12.3	2.16	12	75.9	72.8	78.9
2000–2005	248,000	82,000	166,000	15.9	5.2	10.7	2.00	8	77.9	74.8	80.9
2005–2010	240,000	85,000	155,000	14.5	5.1	9.4	1.88	7	78.6	75.5	81.7
2010–2015	235,000	89,000	146,000	13.5	5.1	8.4	1.78	6	79.8	77.0	82.6
2015–2020	233,000	96,000	137,000	13.3	5.2	7.5	1.73	5	81.0	78.3	83.6
* CBR = crude birth rate (per 1000); CDR = crude death rate (per 1000); NC = natural change (per 1000); IMR = infant mortality rate per 1000 births; TFR = total fertility rate (number of children per woman)

Share of births to foreign born mothers

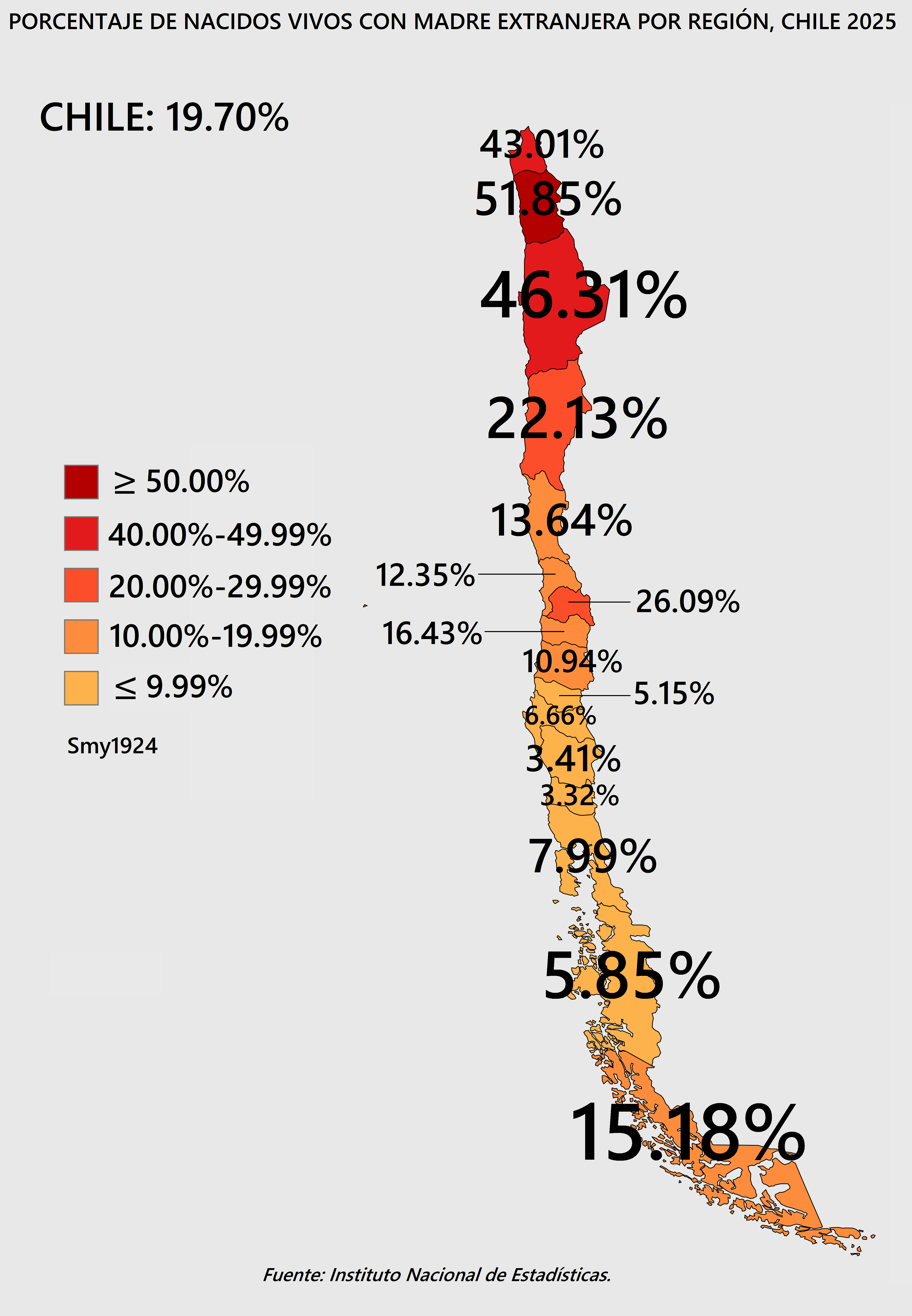
2025

== Ethnic groups ==
Racial groups in Chile (2024 census)
1. Undeclared (87.7%)
2. Indigenous (11.4%)
3. Blacks (0.94%)

Chile is a diverse society, home to individuals with varied ethnic backgrounds. Studies on the ethnic makeup of Chile differ significantly from one another.

According to censuses from the colonial period, the white population exceeded 70% of the population of Chile (approximately 79% in 1810). 102

Studies estimates the white population at between 20%, to over 60% of the Chilean population. According to genetic research by the University of Brasília, Chilean genetic admixture consists of 51.6% European, 42.1% Amerindian, and 6.3% African ancestry. According to an autosomal genetic study of 2014 carried out among soldiers in the city of Arica, Northern Chile, the European admixture goes from 56.8% in soldiers born in Magallanes to 41.2% for the ones who were born in Tarapacá. According to a study from 2013, conducted by the Candela Project in Northern Chile as well, the genetic admixture of Chile is 52% European, 44% Native American, and 4% African.

A 2007 public health book from the University of Chile states that 65% of the population are Mestizos with predominantly White admixture, with 30% being of Caucasoid origin and Amerindians comprising the remaining 5%. National Autonomous University of Mexico (UNAM) professor of Latin American studies, Francisco Lizcano, estimates that 52.7% of the Chilean population can be classified as culturally European, with 39.3% being Mestizo and the remaining 8% belonging to Amerindian cultures. Other social studies put the total number of Whites at over 60%. According to a study performed in 2014, 37.9% of Chileans self-identified as white, and subsequent DNA tests showed that the average self-identifying white was genetically 54% European.

According to a 2012 estimate by the US Central Intelligence Agency World Factbook, the population consists of 88.9% of "White and non-Indigenous", with the remaining percentages being Amerindians, except for a 0.3% "unspecified".

The 2011 Latinobarómetro survey asked respondents in Chile to identify their race, with the majority (67%) selecting "white," followed by "mestizo" (25%), and "indigenous" (8%). In a 2002 national poll, the majority of Chileans reported having "some" (43.4%) or "much" (8.3%) indigenous ancestry, while 40.3% claimed to have none.

As of 2002, according to Encyclopedia Britannica, 89% of Chileans were white or mestizo, and 11% were Indigenous. A 2002 national census classified the population as indigenous and non-indigenous rather than as White or Mestizo.

=== Indigenous communities ===
Distribution of the pre-Hispanic people of Chile, north is to the right

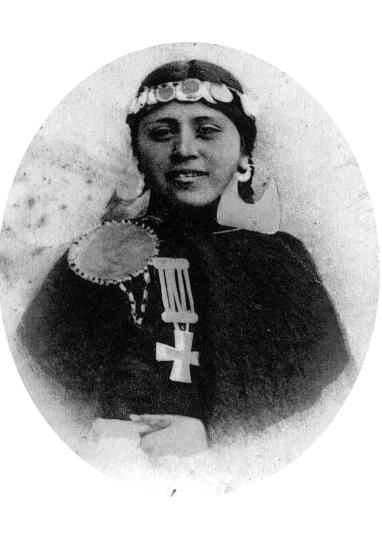
1902 photograph of a Mapuche girl from Concepción in southern Chile

The 1907 census reported 101,118 Indians, or 3.1% of the total country population. Only those that practiced their native culture or spoke their native language were considered, irrespective of their "racial purity."

According to the 2002 census, only indigenous people that still practiced a native culture or spoke a native language were surveyed, and 4.6% of the population (692,192 people) fit that description. Of that 4.6%, 87.3% declared themselves Mapuche. Most of the indigenous population show varying degrees of mixed ancestry.

Chile is one of the twenty-two countries to have signed and ratified the only binding international law concerning indigenous peoples, Indigenous and Tribal Peoples Convention, 1989. It was adopted in 1989 as the International Labour Organization (ILO) Convention 169. Chile ratified the convention in 2008. In November 2009, a court decision in Chile, considered to be a landmark ruling in indigenous rights concerns, made use of the ILO convention 169. The Supreme Court decision on Aymara water rights upholds rulings by both the Pozo Almonte tribunal and the Iquique Court of Appeals, and marks the first judicial application of ILO Convention 169 in Chile.

Chile administers Easter Island a territory 4,100 km (2,500 mi) west of the mainland. The Rapa Nui people are native to the island and are Polynesian in origin. About 3,500 live on the island, but around 10,000 came to the mainland in the 20th century.

Those belonging to recognised indigenous communities (2002)
Community	Population	Percentage
Alacaluf	2,622	0.02%
Mapuche	604,349	4.00%
Atacameño	21,015	0.14%
Quechua	6,175	0.04%
Aymara	48,501	0.32%
Rapanui	4,647	0.03%
Colla	3,198	0.02%
Yaghan	1,685	0.01%

=== European immigration ===
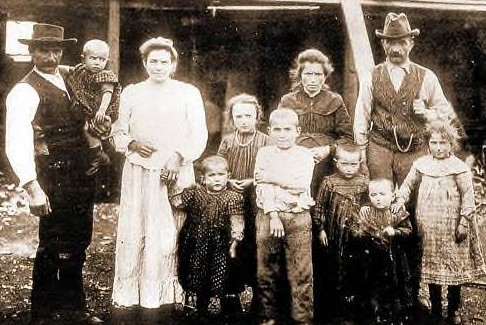
Italian (Emilian) immigrants to Capitán Pastene in southern Chile.

Chile – located far from Europe and difficult to reach – was never an attractive place for migrants from Europe, a situation recognized in the census of 1907, the census which recorded the highest percentage of Europeans versus the total population of Chile (2.2%).

The observed increase in 1885 is due in large part to the annexation of three provinces after the Pacific War and the final conquest of the Araucanía. Given that our country receives almost no foreign immigration, this increase is significant, when compared with that of more advanced countries in this regard. The comparative table that follows demonstrates this:

(...)

Except for those lucky countries that have seen in the last half century flocking to its beaches a huge influx of immigrants, a situation that unfortunately is not ours, the rate of increase of the population of Chile, figures honorably between the rate of the most prosperous countries on Earth.

— National Institute of Statistics (Instituto Nacional de Estadísticas)

European migration in the 19th century did not result in a remarkable change in the ethnic composition of Chile, except in the region of Magellan and the city of Concepcion in the BIO-BIO Region.

Spain and France was the largest source of European immigration to Chile during the 17th and 18th centuries, specially from the deep southern parts of Andalusia and Extremadura, which contributed to the Chilean ethnogenesis with thousands of peasants who migrated to the fertile lands of the Chilean Central Valley alongside the Basque merchants who started to arrive in the 18th century in great numbers.

The largest contingent of people to have arrived in post-independence Chile came from Spain and from the Basque country, a region divided between northern Spain and southern France. Estimates of the number of Chileans who have one or two surnames of Basque origin range from 10% (1,600,000) to as high as 20% (3,200,000). Note that this phenomenon occurs not only in Chile, but also in every Autonomous Community of Spain, as well as in other Latin American countries – one can see that a substantial portion of their populations have one or two surnames of Basque or Navarre origin, tending to be more common in the upper classes, and hence becoming more unusual in lower classes.

Chile's various waves of non-Spanish immigrants include Italians, Irish, French, Greeks, Germans, English, Scots, Croats, and Poles.

In 1848 an important and substantial German immigration took place, laying the foundation for the German-Chilean community. Sponsored by the Chilean government for the colonization of the southern region, the Germans (including German-speaking Swiss, Silesians, Alsatians and Austrians), strongly influenced the cultural and racial composition of the southern provinces of Chile. It is difficult to count the number of descendants of Germans in Chile, given the great amount of time since 1848. Because many areas of southern Chile were sparsely populated, the traces of German immigration there are quite noticeable. An independent estimate calculates that about 500,000 Chileans could descend from German immigrants.

Other historically significant immigrant groups included Croats, whose descendants today are estimated at 380,000 persons, or 2.4% of the Chilean population. Some authors claim that close to 4.6% of the Chilean population must have some Croatian ancestry. Over 700,000 Chileans (4.5% of the Chilean population) may have British (English, Scottish or Welsh) and Irish forebears. Chileans of Greek descent are estimated to number between 90,000 and 120,000; most live in or near either Santiago or Antofagasta, and Chile is one of the five countries in the world most populated with descendants of Greeks. The descendants of Swiss immigrants add 90,000, and estimates suggest that about 5% of the Chilean population has some French ancestry. 600,000 Chileans descend from Italian immigrants. Other groups of Europeans exist but are found in smaller numbers, such as the descendants of Austrians and Dutchmen (estimated at about 50,000).

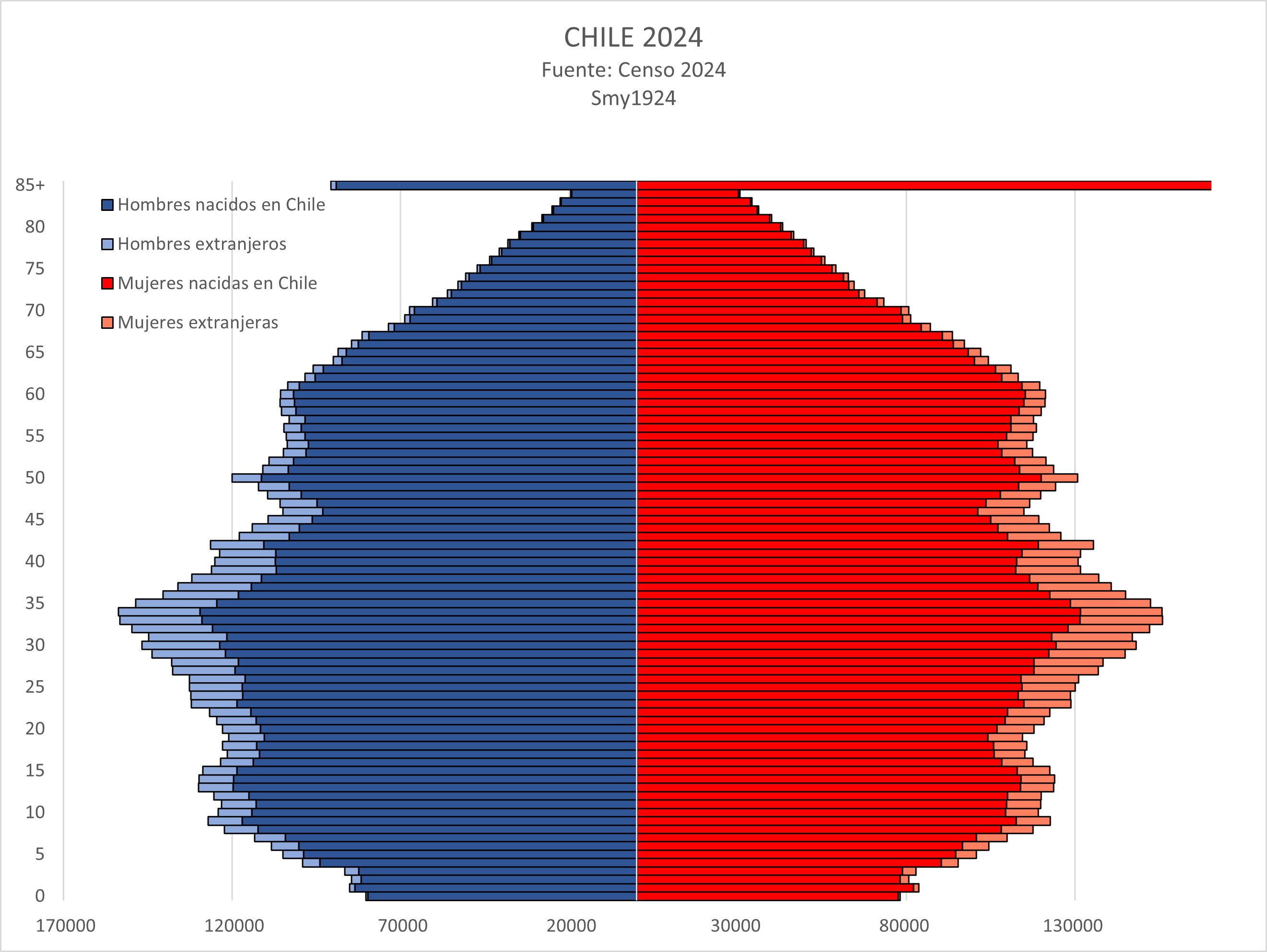
Population pyramid of Chilean-born people (darker color) and foreigners (lighter) 2024

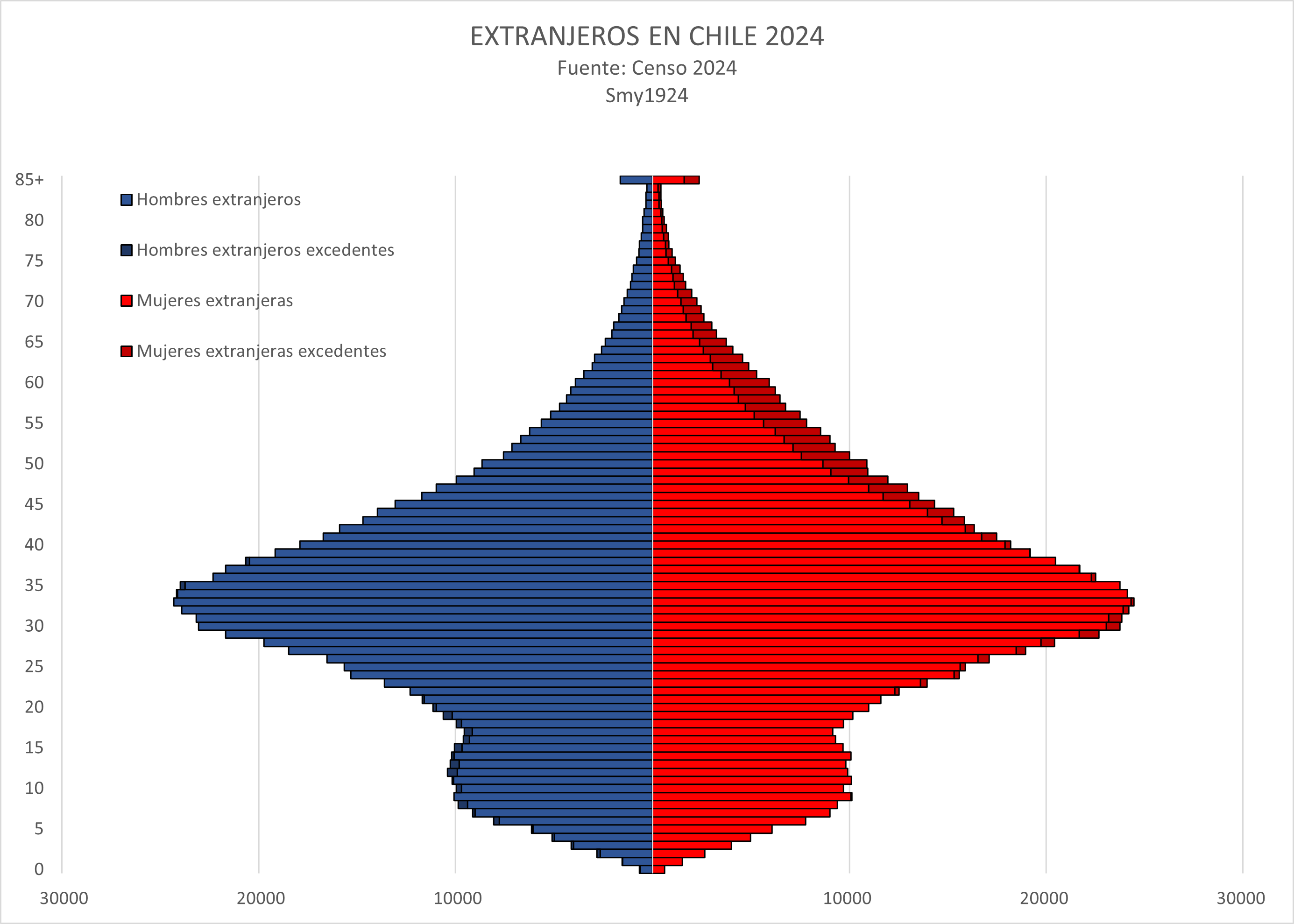
Population pyramid of foreigners in Chile, 2024.

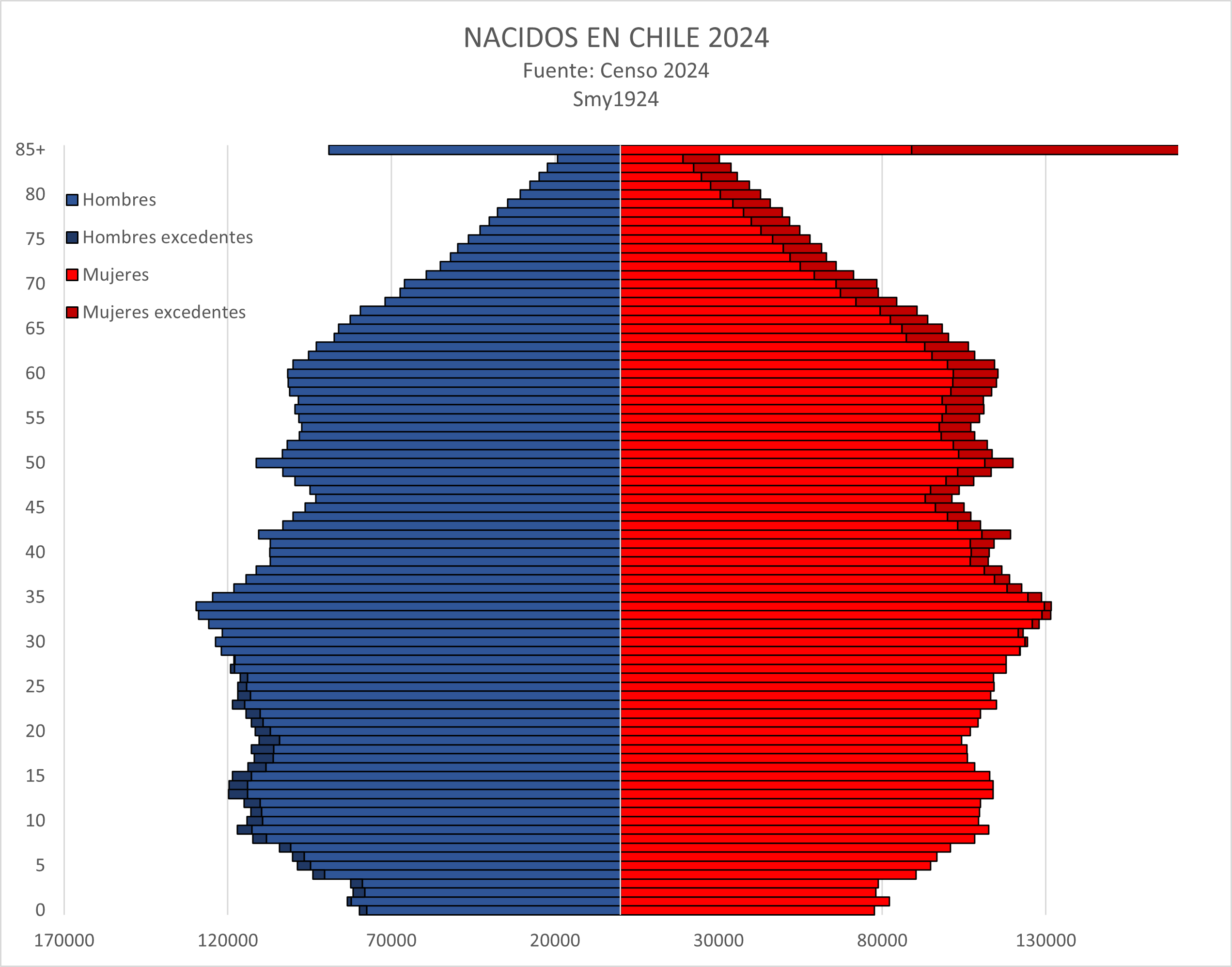
Population pyramid of Chilean-born people in Chile, 2024 census.

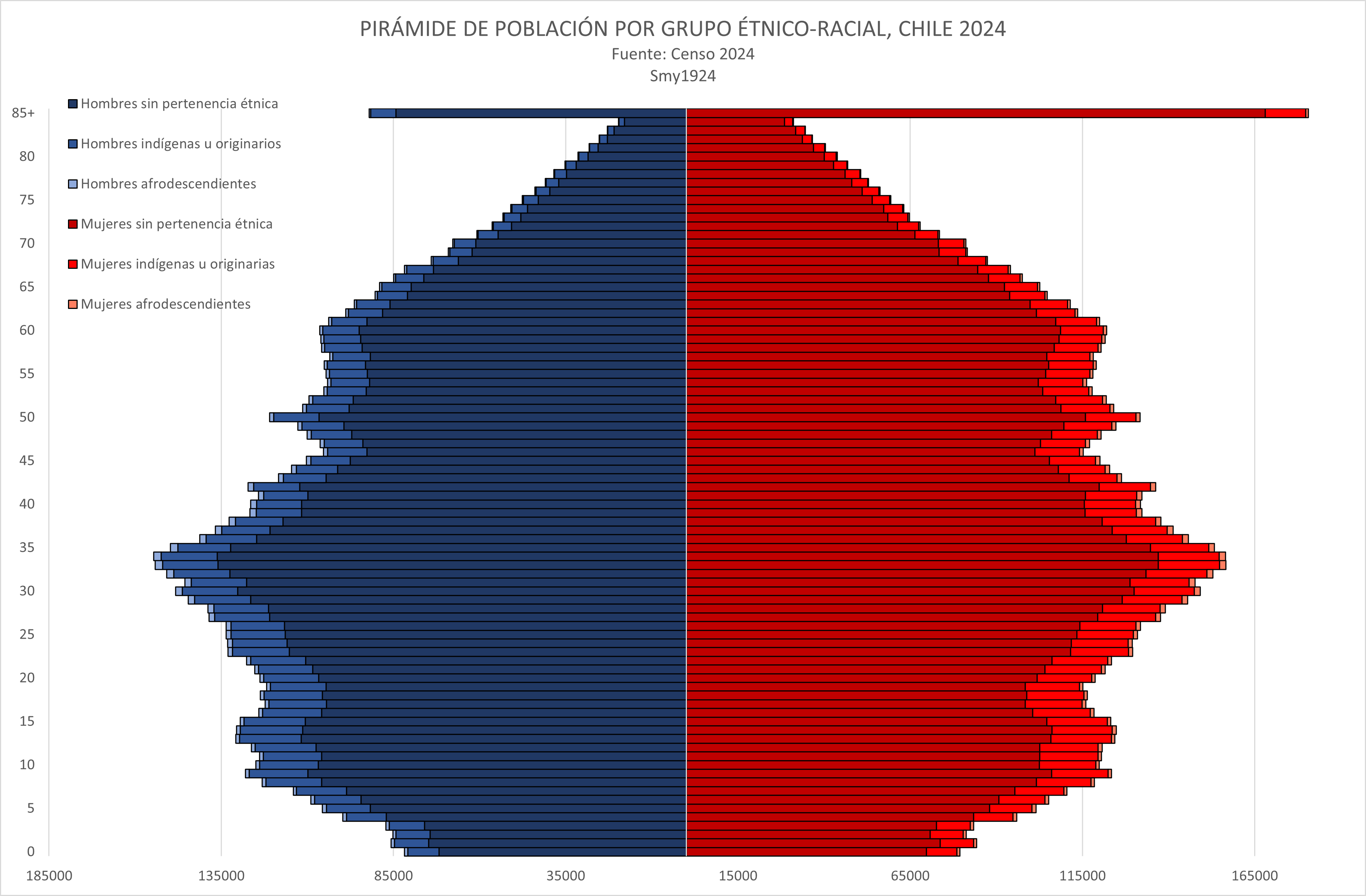
Population pyramid of Chile by ethnicity/race, 2024.

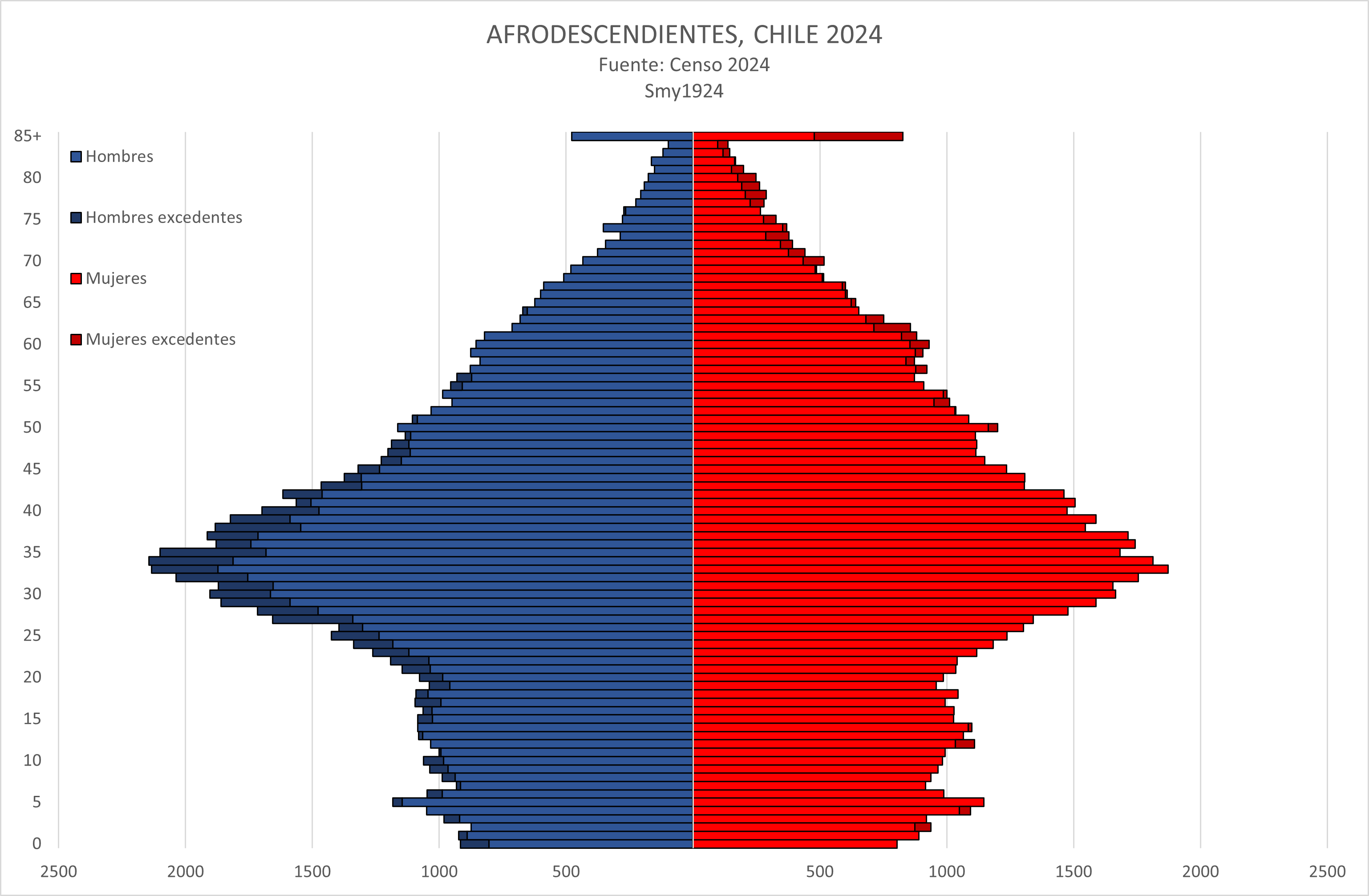
Afrodescendants' pyramid population of Chile, 2024

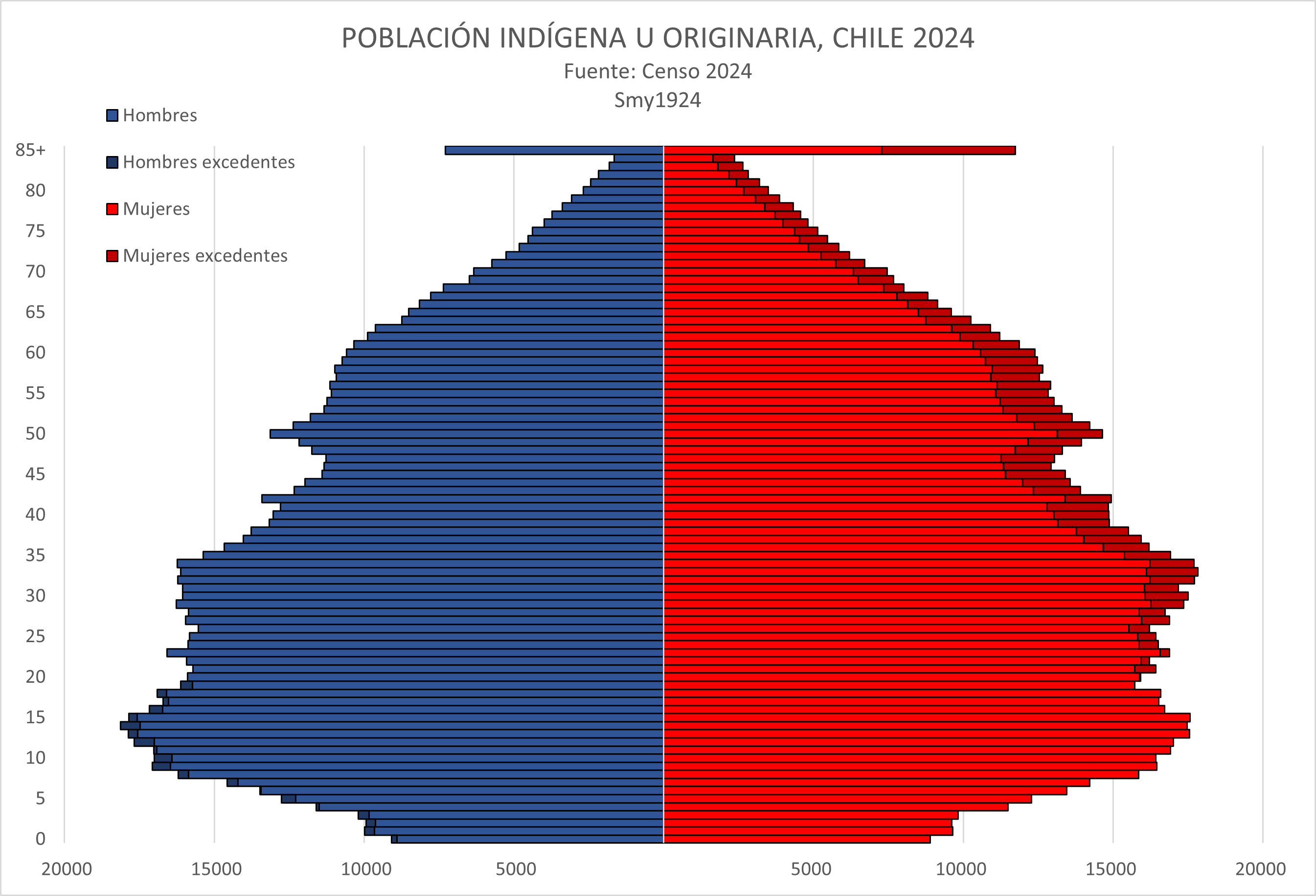
Indigenous pyramid population of Chile 2024.

=== Latin American immigrants ===
Since the reestablishment of democracy in Chile, the former tendency for emigrants from the country to outnumber immigrants to it has reversed. Chile now is one of the two countries in Latin America with a positive migration rate. Since 1990, with the opening of Chile to the world, through a free market system, and the consequent socioeconomic development of the country, has been noted the attraction of a significant number of immigrants from various Latin American countries, which represented in Census 2017, approximately 1,200,000 people, corresponding to 7% of the population residing in the Chilean territory, without counting their descendants born in Chile, due to the effects of the ius soli. Their main origins, corresponds to: 288,233 Venezuelans, 223,923 Peruvians, 179,338 Haitians, 146,582 Colombians, 107,346 Bolivians, 74,713 Argentines, 36,994 Ecuadorians, 18,185 Brazilians, 17,959 Dominicans, 15,837 Cubans and 8,975 Mexicans.

This has prompted a change in the physiognomy of certain communes in the country where its number is concentrated. In communes such as Santiago Centro and Independencia, 1/3 of residents is a Latin American immigrant (28% and 31% of the population of these communes, respectively). Other communes of Greater Santiago with high numbers of immigrants are Estación Central (17%) and Recoleta (16%). In the northern regions such as Antofagasta region, 17.3% of the population is a Latin American foreigner, with communes such as Ollagüe (31%), Mejillones (16%), Sierra Gorda (16%) and Antofagasta (11%), with high percentages of Latin American immigrants, mainly Bolivians, Colombians and Peruvians.

=== Other ethnic groups ===
It is estimated that about 5% of the population (800,000) is descendant of Asian immigrants, chiefly from the Middle East (i.e. Palestinians, Syrians and Lebanese, see Arab Chileans). Most of these are Christians from the Levant, of whom roughly 500,000 are Palestinian descendants, mostly Christians, are believed to reside in Chile. Additionally, about 18,000–25,000 Jews reside in Chile.

In recent years, Chile has had a growing East Asian population, mainly from China (see Chinese Chilean), but also from Japan (see Japanese Chilean) and South Korea (see Koreans in Chile). The earliest wave of East Asian immigration took place in the late 19th and early 20th centuries, mainly Chinese and Japanese contract laborers.

There is a sizable population of Romani people in Chile. They are widely and easily recognized, and continue to hold on to their traditions and language, and many continue to live semi-nomadic lifestyles traveling from city to city and living in small tented communities.

=== Population genetics ===
Genetics studies fluctuate between 57.8% and 67.9% European; between 32.1% and 44.3% Amerindian; and 2.5%—6.3% African ancestry percentages. A genetic study by the University of Chile found that the average Chilean's genetic makeup consists of 64% Caucasian and 35% Amerindian ancestry. In a 2014 study of Chilean soldiers stationed in Arica, researchers found that the average self-identifying white person (37.9%) was genetically only 54% European.

== Languages ==
Languages background in Chile (2012 est.)
Languages	Percent
Spanish	99.5%
English	10.2%
Indigenous (Mapudungun, Aymara, Quechua, Rapa Nui)	1%
Other	2.3%
Unspecified	0.2%

The Spanish spoken in Chile is distinctively accented and quite unlike that of neighbouring South American countries because final syllables and "s" sounds are dropped, and some consonants have a soft pronunciation. Accent varies only very slightly from north to south; more noticeable are the small differences in accent based on social class or whether one lives in the city or the country. That the Chilean population was largely formed in a small section at the center of the country and then migrated in modest numbers to the north and south helps explain this relative lack of differentiation, which was maintained by the national reach of radio, and now television, which also helps to diffuse and homogenize colloquial expressions.

There are several indigenous languages spoken in Chile: Mapudungun, Quechua, Aymara and Rapa Nui. After the Spanish invasion, Spanish took over as the lingua franca and the indigenous languages have become minority languages, with some now extinct or close to extinction.

German is spoken to a great extent in southern Chile, either in small countryside pockets or as a second language among the communities of larger cities.

Through initiatives such as the English Opens Doors program, the government made English mandatory for students in fifth-grade and above in public schools. Most private schools in Chile start teaching English from kindergarten. Common English words have been absorbed and appropriated into everyday Spanish speech. Since 2010, all students from 3rd grade in secondary school have been tested on listening and reading comprehension in English. The evaluation is compulsory and the instrument is Educational Testing Service's TOEIC Bridge.

== Religion ==
Religious background in Chile (2021 est.)
Religion	Percent
Roman Catholic	42%
None	37%
Evangelical	14%
Other	6%

Christianity is the most widely professed religion in Chile, with Catholicism being its largest denomination.

== Graphs and maps ==
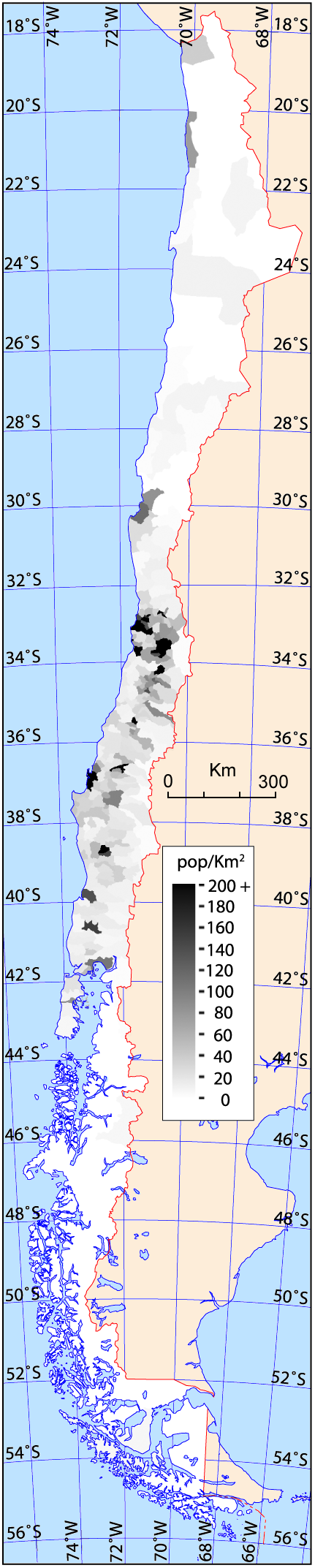
Chile. Population density by commune, based on 2002 census (2009)

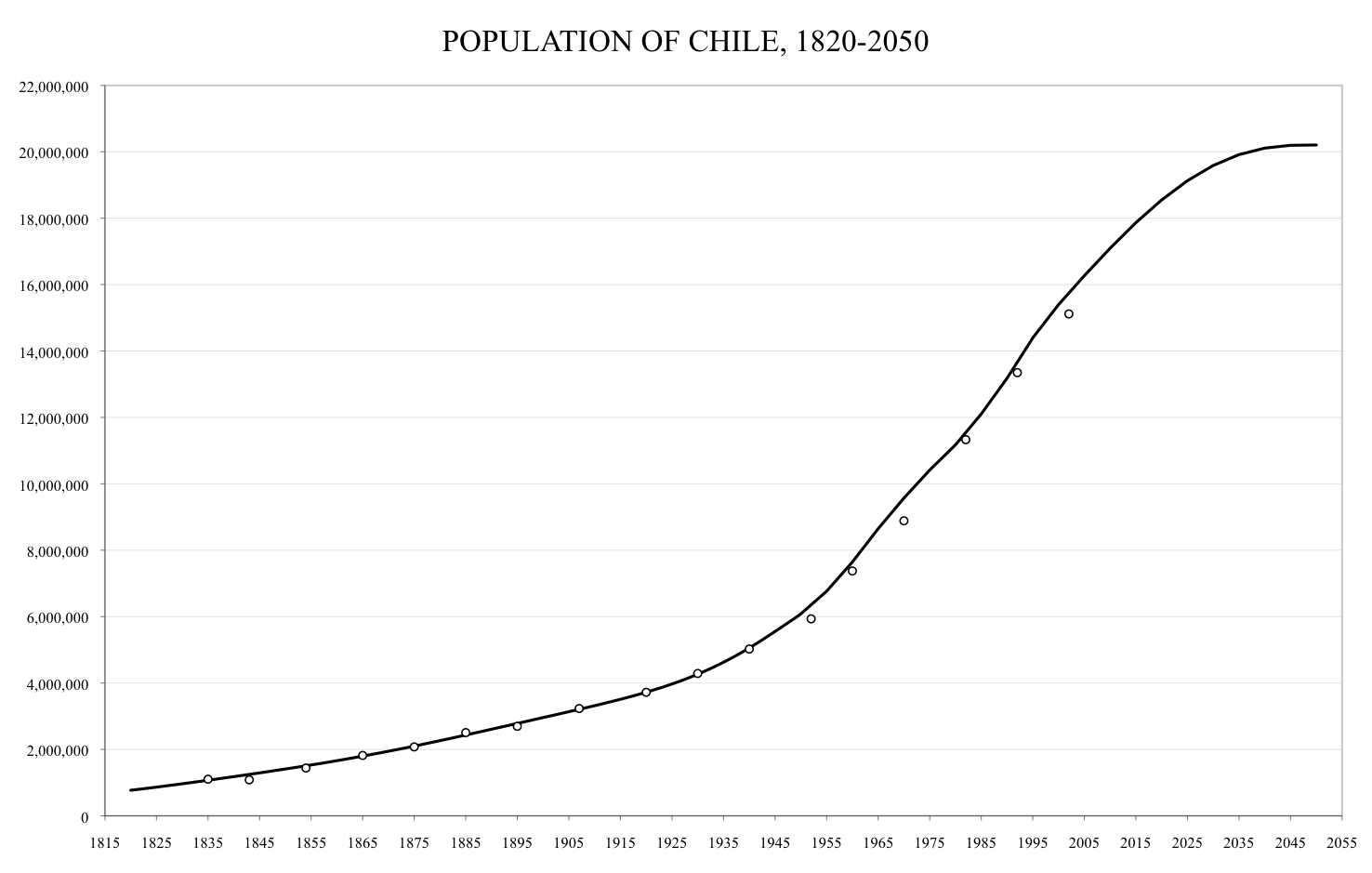
Population from 1820, projected up to 2050

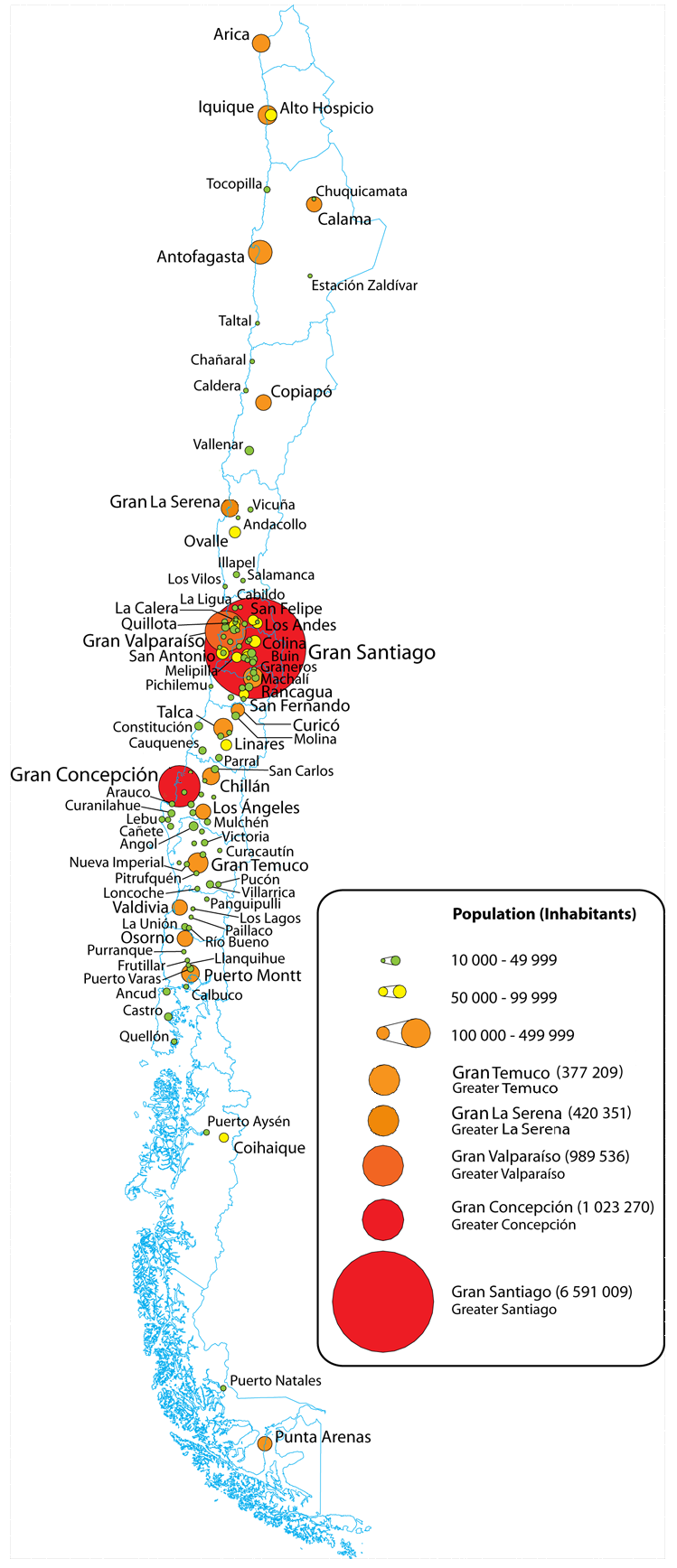
Agglomerations and cities above 10,000 inhabitants in 2005

Life expectancy in Chile since 1900

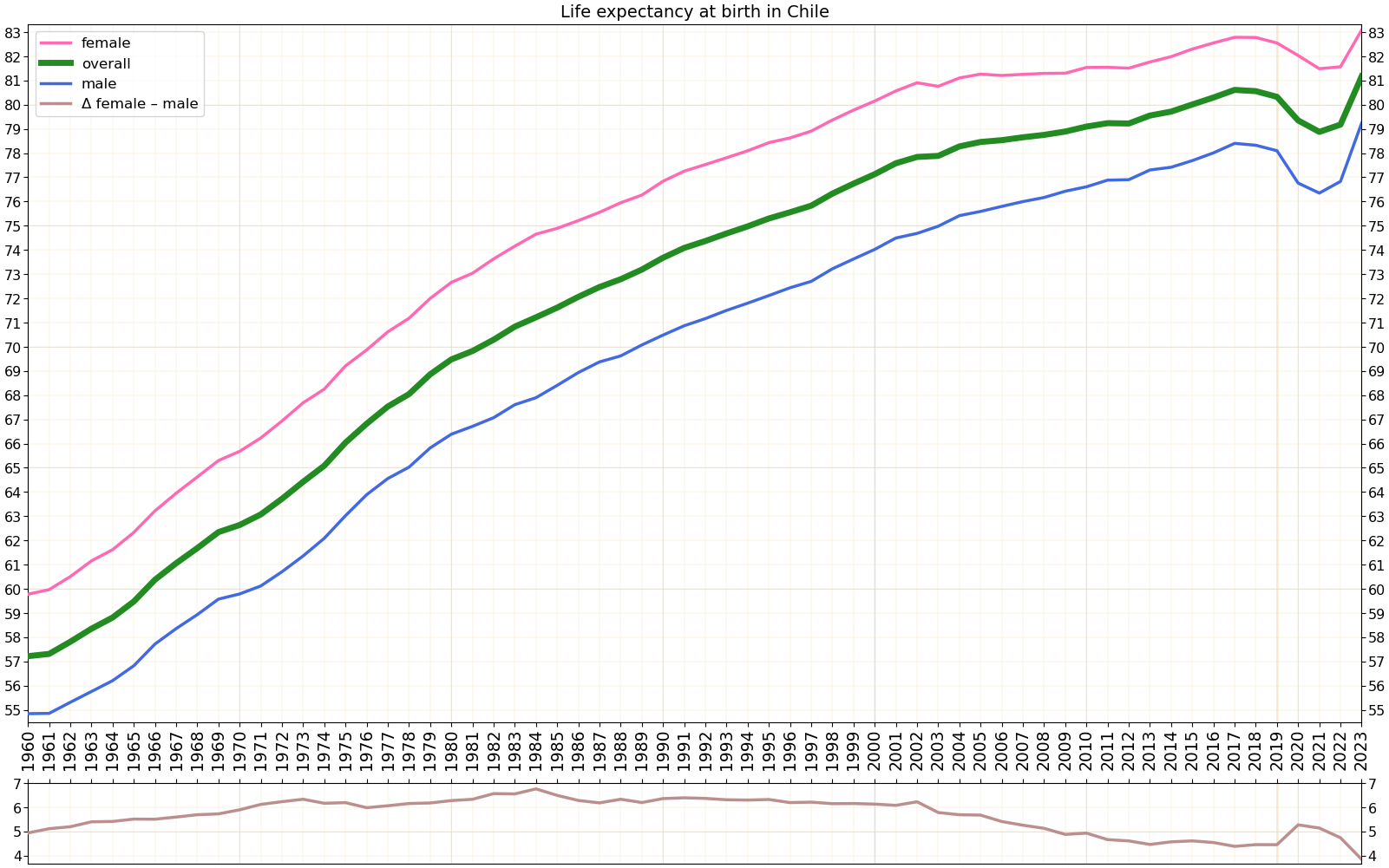
Life expectancy in Chile since 1960 by gender
