= Koreans in Chile =

Ethnic group

Koreans in Chile Coreanos en Chile
칠레 한국인

Total population
- 2,510 (2011, MOFAT)

Regions with significant populations
- Barrio Patronato in Santiago

Languages
- Spanish (Chilean Spanish), Korean

Religion
- Presbyterianism and Roman Catholicism

Related ethnic groups
- Korean diaspora

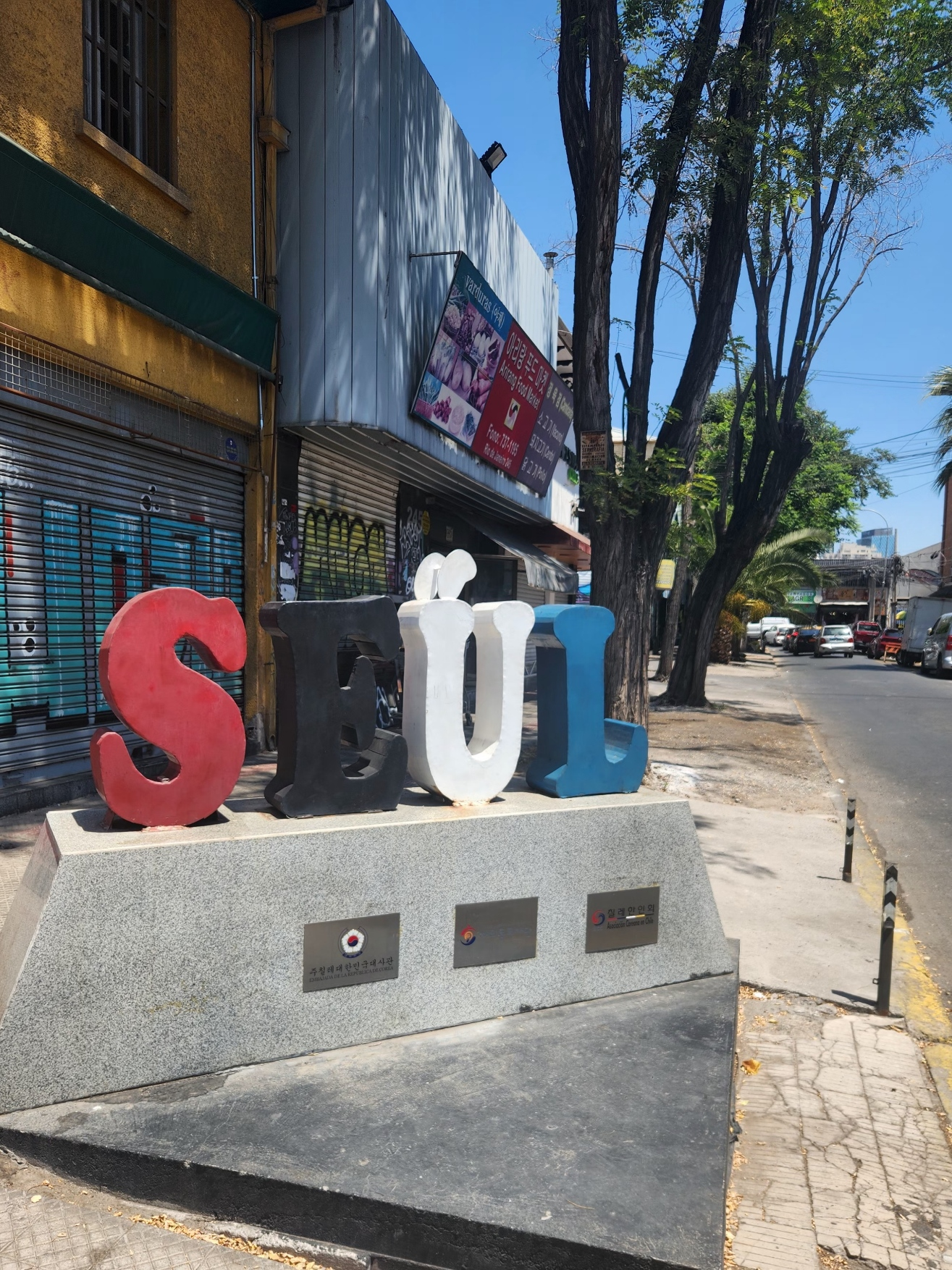
Homage to Seoul from the Korean diaspora in Chile, in the Patronato neighbourhood of Santiago

Koreans in Chile (Spanish: Coreanos en Chile) (Korean: 칠레 한국인) formed Latin America's sixth-largest Korean diaspora community as of 2011, according to the statistics of South Korea's Ministry of Foreign Affairs and Trade.

== Migration history ==
The earliest Korean migrants to Chile were soldiers of the North Korean army captured by United Nations forces, who declined repatriation after the signing of the Korean Armistice Agreement and came to Chile under the auspices of the Red Cross. They were resettled in the city of Temuco.

Immigration from South Korea to Chile would not begin until 1970, when five families came to work in the floriculture sector. Three more families came by way of Bolivia in 1975 and another ten in 1976. By 1978, the year of the founding of the Asociación Coreana de Chile, there were between twenty and thirty Korean families residing in Chile. In 1978, twenty Korean families founded a school, the Colegio Coreano, with the assistances of the Presbyterian Church to offer weekend courses in Korean language, culture and history to Korean children in Chile.

Most of the families immigrating in those days actually had Argentina as their final destination, and intended to reside in Chile only as long as it took them to obtain an Argentine visa, but as Argentina required prospective immigrants to have at least US$30,000 in capital, many found themselves unable to qualify; they instead settled in Chile, where the requirement was merely one-sixth that amount. Many settled in the Barrio Patronato, a traditionally immigrant-dominated neighbourhood then filled largely with Arabs. They started out in the textile manufacturing sector, but along with Chile's shift away from an import substitution-oriented economic model, they turned to opening shops and importing clothing and other products from their homeland instead.

Between 1997 and 2005, the Korean population of Chile grew by one-quarter, from 1,470 to 1,858 individuals, surpassing in size the community of Koreans in Peru. Afterwards, the population continued to grow, to 2,510 by 2011. South Korean governments showed a total of 48 ethnic Koreans with Chilean nationality, 2,366 with permanent residency, seven international students, and 119 with other types of visas.

== Inter-ethnic relations ==
Koreans in Chile are respected by Chileans of other backgrounds for their work ethic, but are perceived as a very closed community, especially with regards to interracial marriage. The Korean shops of Patronato are well known for their low prices and diverse products but some Chileans and competitors feel some envy towards the commercial success of Koreans in their country. At the same time, however, Chileans have respect for the rapid economic development undertaken by South Korea. On the other hand, Koreans in Chile often perceive Chileans as superficial in their friendships, lazy, irresponsible, and somewhat racist.

== Religion ==
Among the Korean community in Chile, Protestantism is the majority religion; Patronato has two Presbyterian churches and one Roman Catholic one. Many Korean migrants to Chile were not Christians at the time of their arrival, but became churchgoers in order to take part in the specifically Korean social life offered by the churches, which offered them comfort and reminders of home after the stressful experience of migration to a foreign country.

== See also ==
- Chile–South Korea relations
- Korean diaspora
- Ethnic groups in Chile
