= Recoleta, Chile =

Recoleta
- Commune
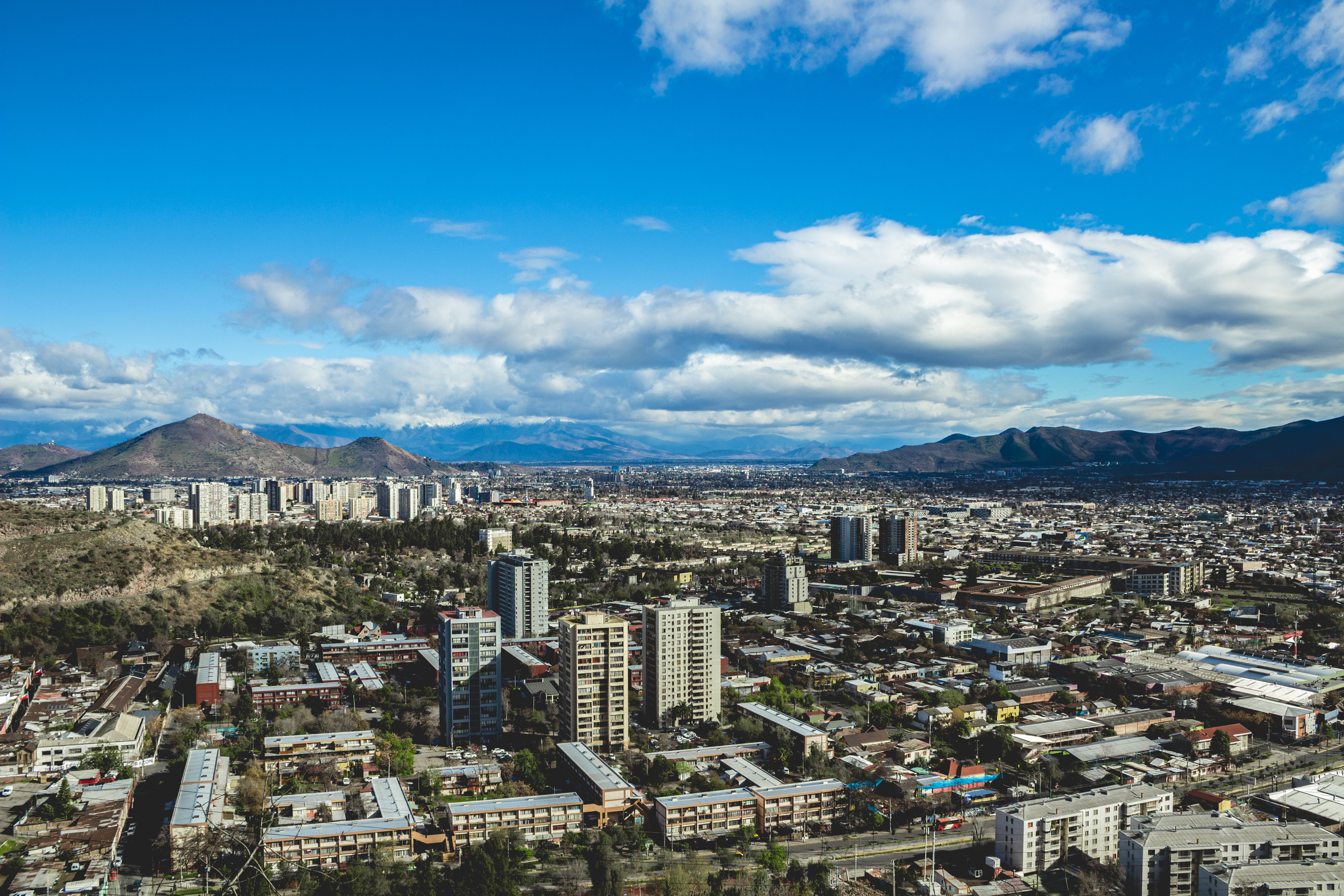
- View of Recoleta from San Cristóbal Hill.

- Coat of arms Map of Recoleta commune within Greater Santiago Location in Chile
- Coordinates (city): 33°24.5′S 70°38′W
- Country: Chile
- Region: Santiago Metropolitan Region
- Province: Santiago

Government
  - Type: Municipality
  - Alcalde: Fares Jadue (PC)

Area
  - Total: 16.2 km^{2} (6.3 sq mi)

Population (2024)
  - Total: 154,615
  - Density: 9,540/km^{2} (24,700/sq mi)
  - Urban: 154,615
  - Rural: 0
- Time zone: UTC-4 (CLT)
  - Summer (DST): UTC-3 (CLST)
- Area code: 56 +
- Website: Municipality of Recoleta

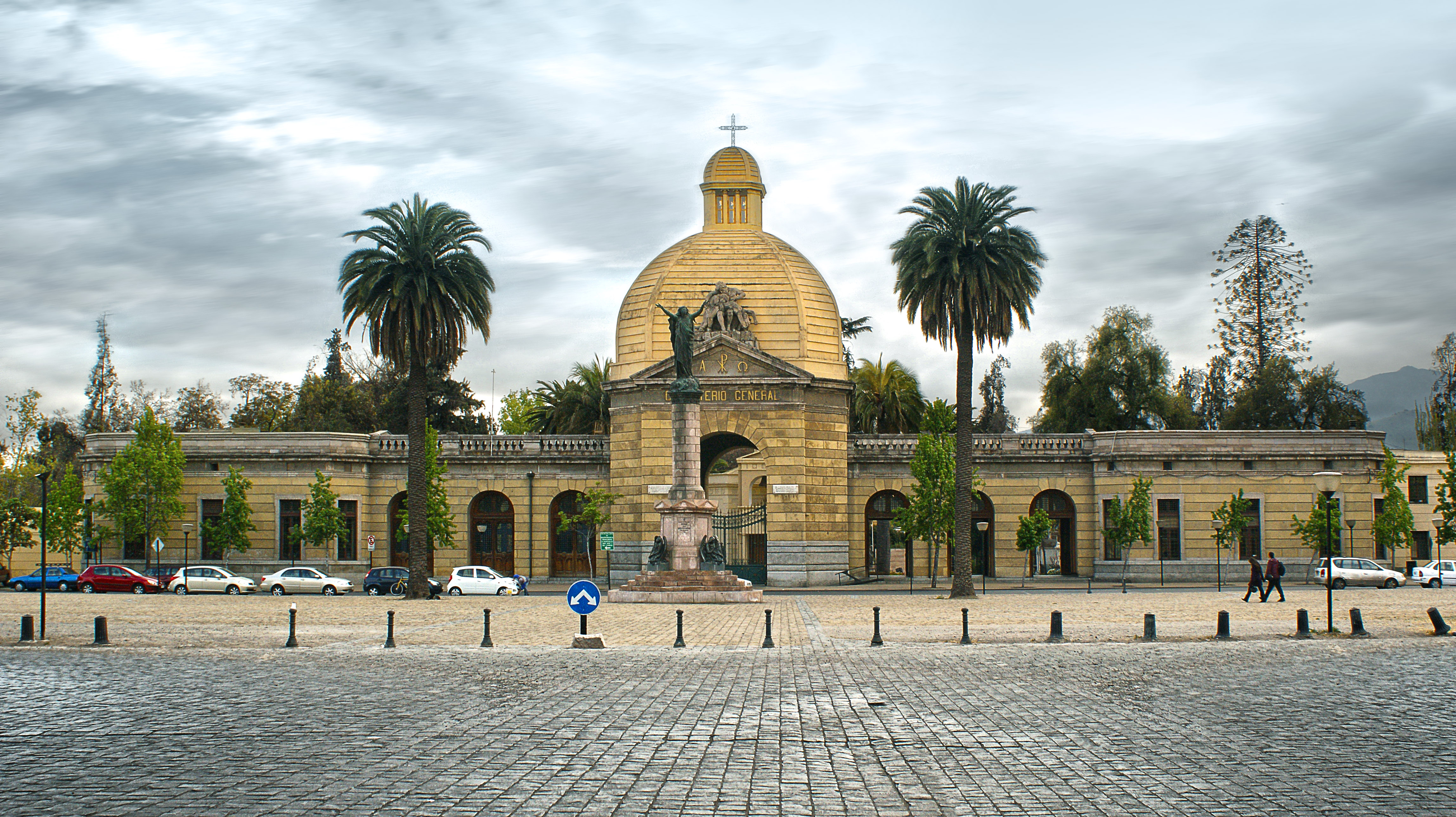
Santiago General Cemetery

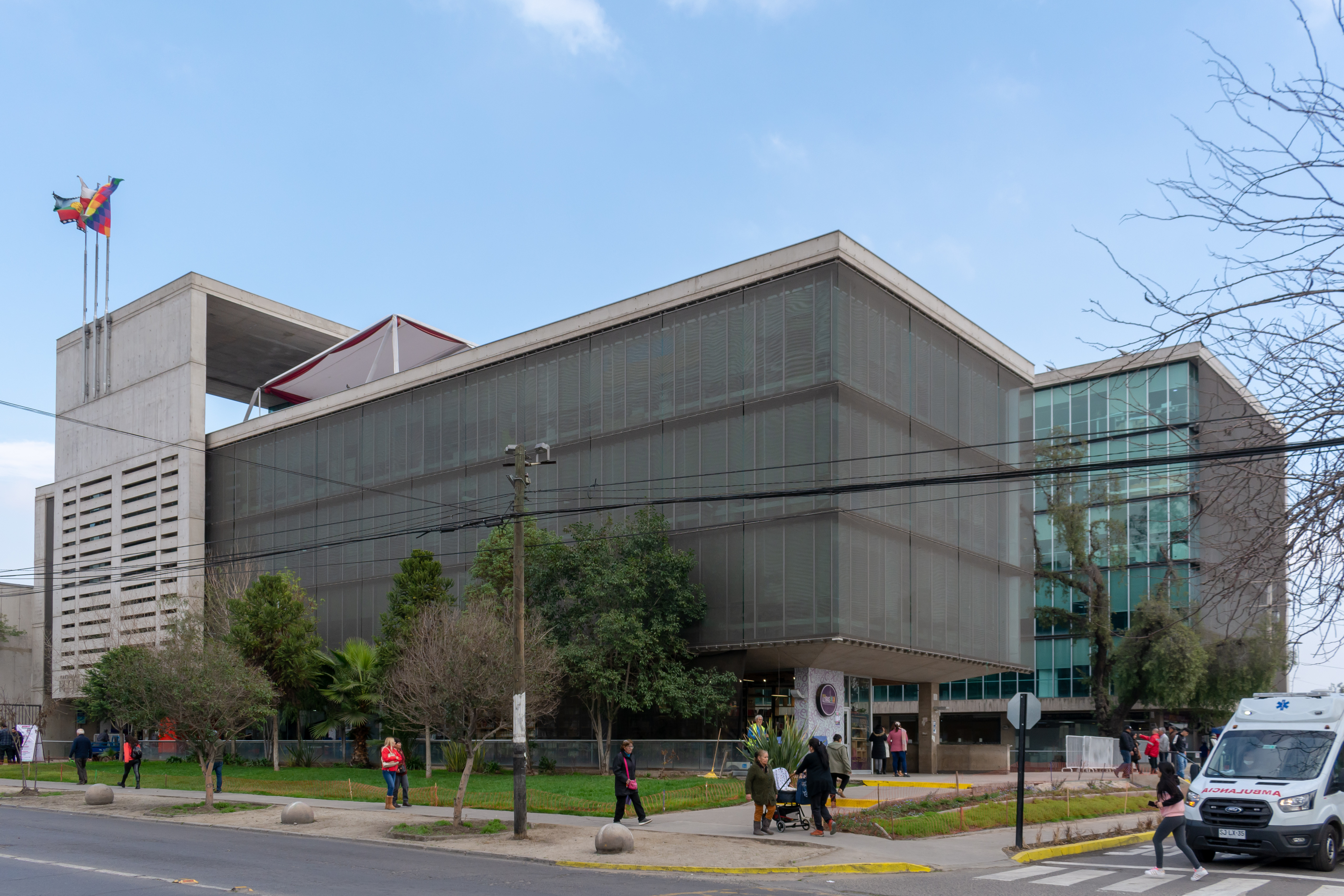
City Hall

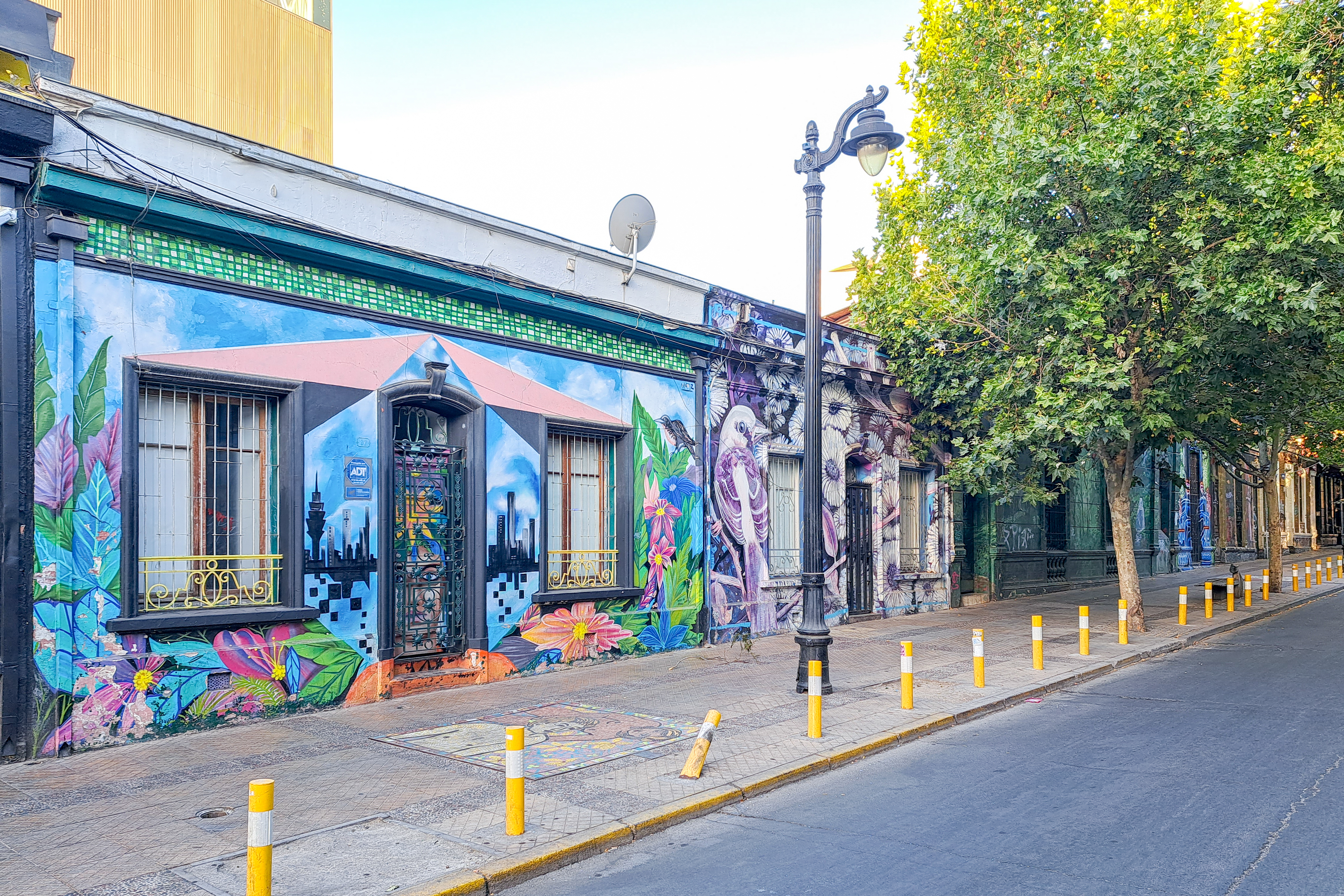
Barrio Bellavista

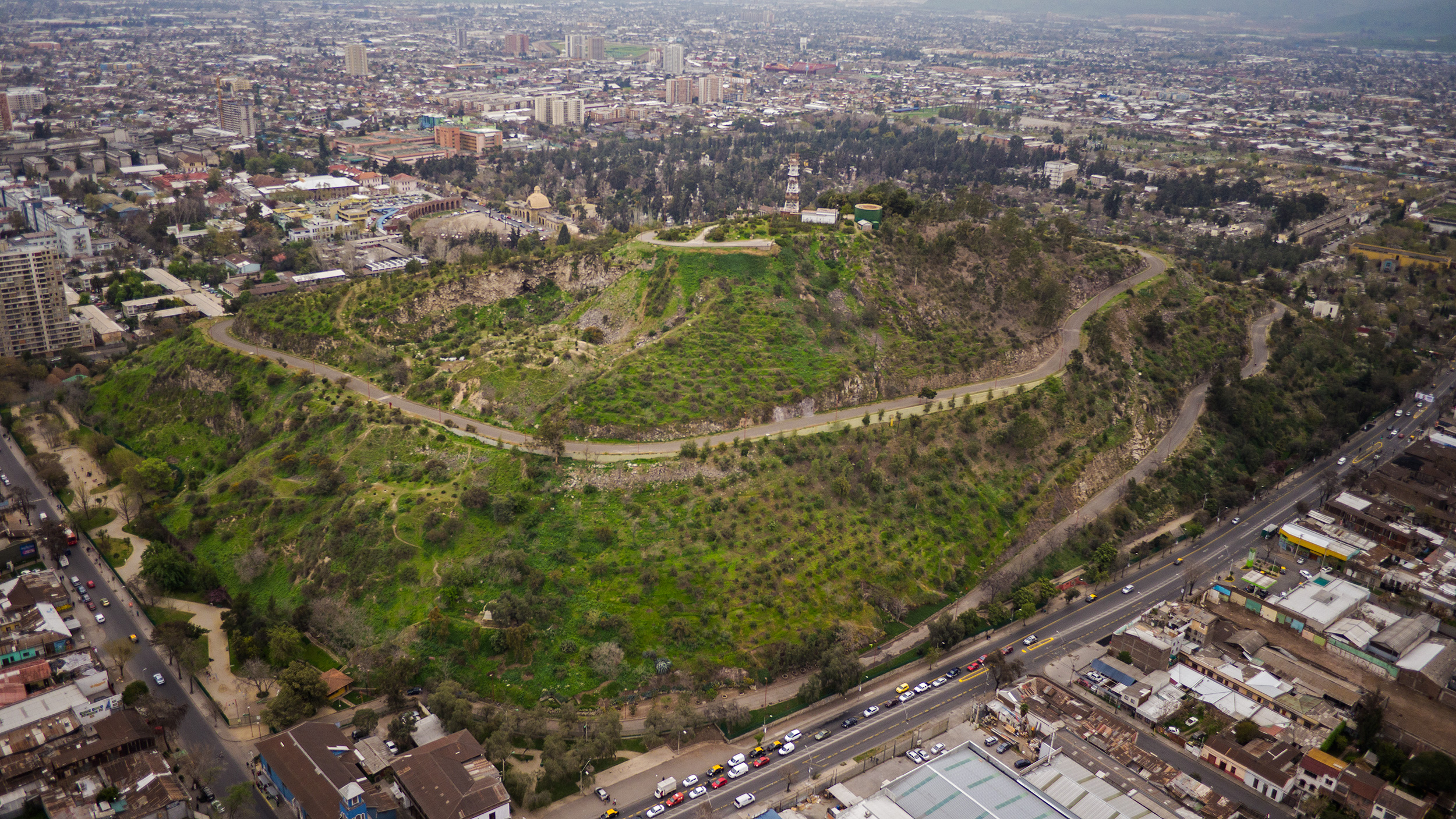
Cerro Blanco

Recoleta is a commune in the Province of Santiago in the Santiago Metropolitan Region in Chile. It has 154,615 inhabitants.

It is located north of the city center directly across the Mapocho River. The commune also bordered by Independencia and Conchalí to its west, Huechuraba to its north and Providencia and Vitacura to its east where the San Cristóbal Hill forms a natural barrier.

== Demographics ==
As of the 2024 census, the population is 154,615, of which 49.2% are male and 50.8% are female. People under 15 years old make up 16.5% of the population, and people over 65 years old make up 14.6%. 100% of the population is urban.

Historical population
Year	Pop.	±% p.a.
1970	141,694	—
1982	164,292	+1.24%
1992	164,767	+0.03%
2002	148,220	−1.05%
2017	157,851	+0.42%
2024	154,615	−0.30%
Source: INE, Memoria Chilena

- Average annual household income: US$4,551 (PPP, 2006)
- Population below poverty line: 12.4% (2006)
- Regional quality of life index: 89.77, high, 4 out of 52 (2005)
- Human Development Index: 0.797, 11 out of 341 (2003)

=== Immigration ===
As of the 2024 census, immigrants make up 22.0% of the population - 19.8% are from South America, 1.8% from North America, 0.1% from Europe, 0.3% from Asia, 0.01% from Africa, and 0.01% from Oceania.

== Administration ==
As a commune, Recoleta is a third-level administrative division of Chile administered by a municipal council, headed by an alcalde that is directly elected every four years. The alcalde for the 2024-2028 term is Fares Jadue Leiva (PC). The communal council has the following members:

- Marta Valera Aranda (REP)
- Silvana Flores Cruz (DEM)
- Marcel Rosse Venegas (RN)
- Alejandra Muñoz Díaz (UDI)
- Karen Garrido Ganga (PC)
- Joceline Parra Delgadillo (PC)
- Cristian Weibel Avendaño (PC)
- Camila Henríquez Lara (PS)

Within the electoral divisions of Chile, Recoleta is part of electoral district No. 9. On the other hand, the commune belongs to the VII Senatorial District that represents the entire Metropolitan Region of Santiago.

== Parks and open space ==
The territory of Recoleta includes the northwest portion of Santiago Metropolitan Park, the Cerro Blanco and the Santiago General Cemetery.

== Culture ==
The bohemian Barrio Bellavista straddles the border between Recoleta and Providencia. Barrio Patronato is a neighbourhood in Recoleta with a commercial district that initially grew with the arrival of Middle Eastern immigrants in the late 19th and early 20th centuries. The La Vega Central Market also lies in close proximity to the Patronato metro station.

Historical churches are located in Recoleta, including the Iglesia de la Recoleta Franciscana and the Iglesia de la Recoleta Dominica.
