= Einstein metro station =

Santiago metro station

Einstein
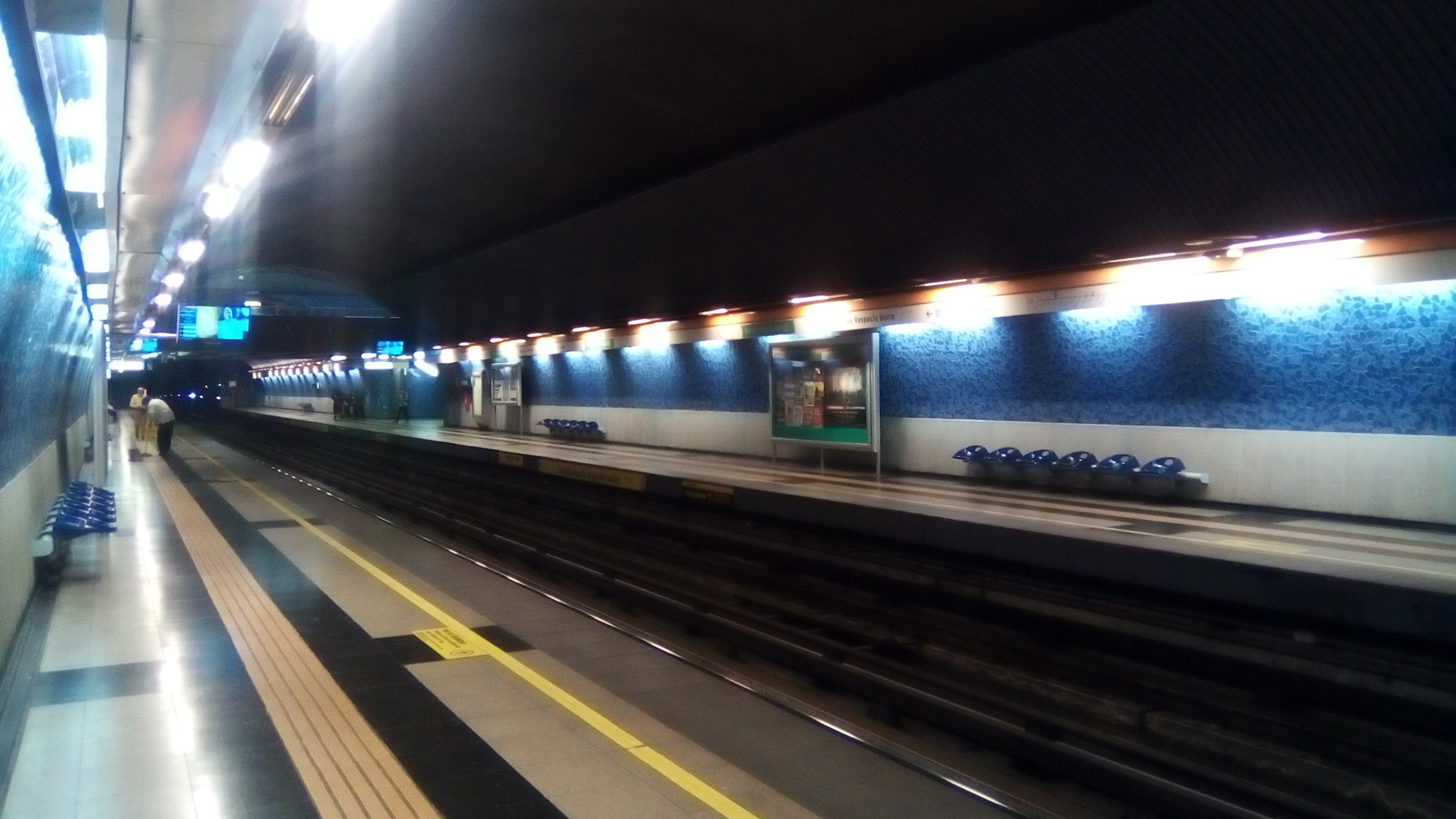
- Platform level

General information
- Location: Recoleta Avenue / Einstein Avenue
- Coordinates: 33°24′20.68″S 70°38′35.33″W
- System: Santiago rapid transit
- Line: Line 2
- Platforms: 2 side platforms
- Tracks: 2
- Connections: Transantiago buses

Construction
- Accessible: yes

History
- Opened: 25 November 2005

Services
Preceding station	Santiago Metro	Following station
Dorsal towards Vespucio Norte	Line 2	Cementerios towards Hospital El Pino
Location

Einstein is an underground metro station on the Line 2 of the Santiago Metro, in Santiago, Chile. This station is named for Einstein Avenue, which in turn was named after Albert Einstein. The station was opened on 25 November 2005 as the northern terminus of the extension of the line from Cerro Blanco. On 21 December 2006, the line was extended to Vespucio Norte.
