= Iglesia de la Recoleta Dominica =

National monument of Chile

Coordinates: 33.4239°S 70.6447°W

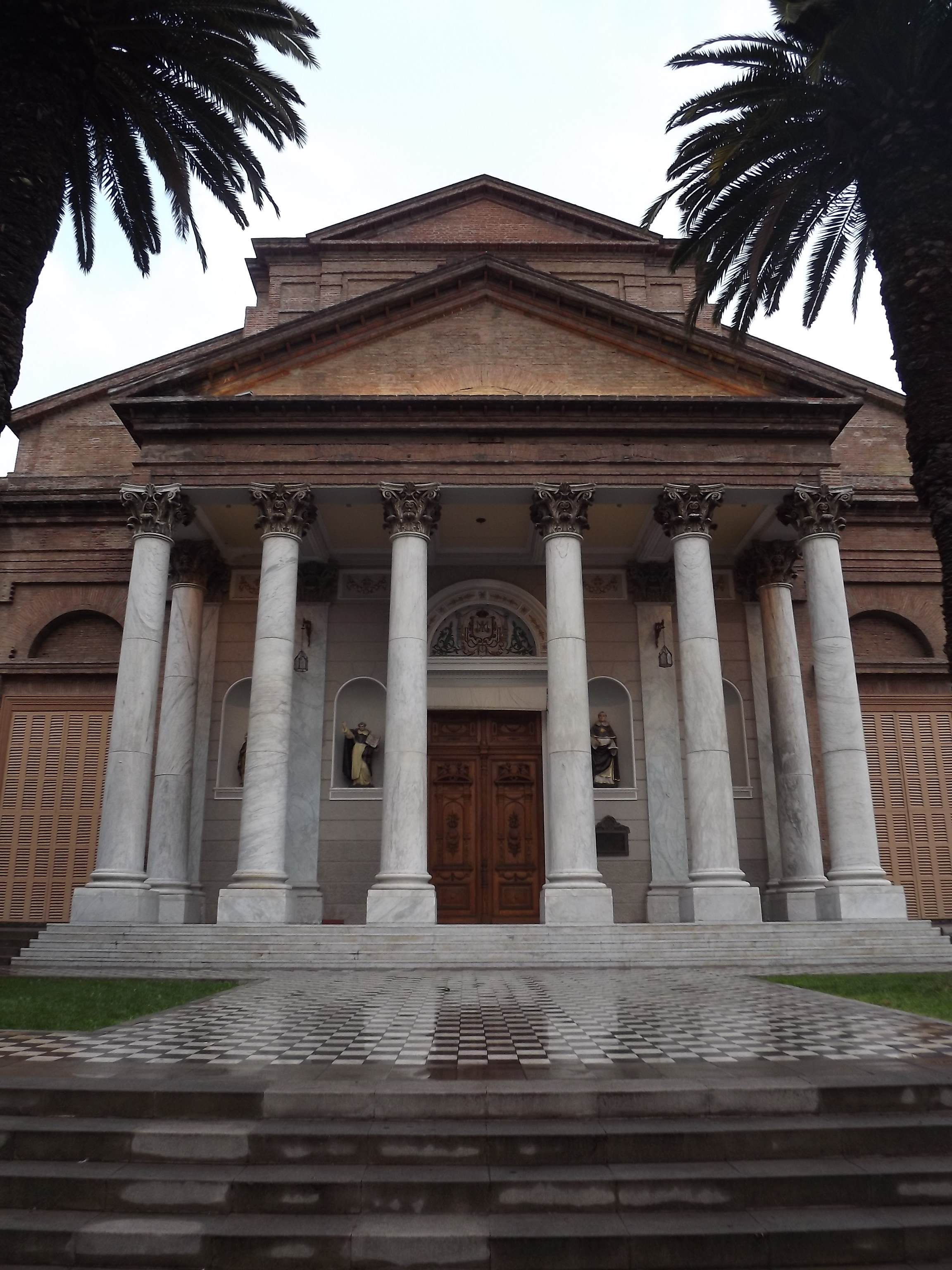
Facade

The Iglesia y convento de la Recoleta Dominica is a church and convent in Recoleta, Santiago de Chile. The church and convent were declared as a National Monument in 1974.

== History ==
The construction of the first church began in 1750, in La Chimba, a district that originally not considered part of the city of Santiago, located immediately north of the Mapocho River.

By the mid-1800s, the steady increase in parishioners motivated plans for an expansion of the church and improvements to its decor. A new main altar was designed by Eusebio Chelli, who, due to the high quality of his work, was commissioned to design a new church.

The church was opened in 1882.

== Architecture ==
The church was inspired by the design of the Basilica of Saint Paul Outside the Walls and boasts sixty Carrara marble columns.
