= Cerro Blanco metro station =

Santiago metro station

Cerro Blanco
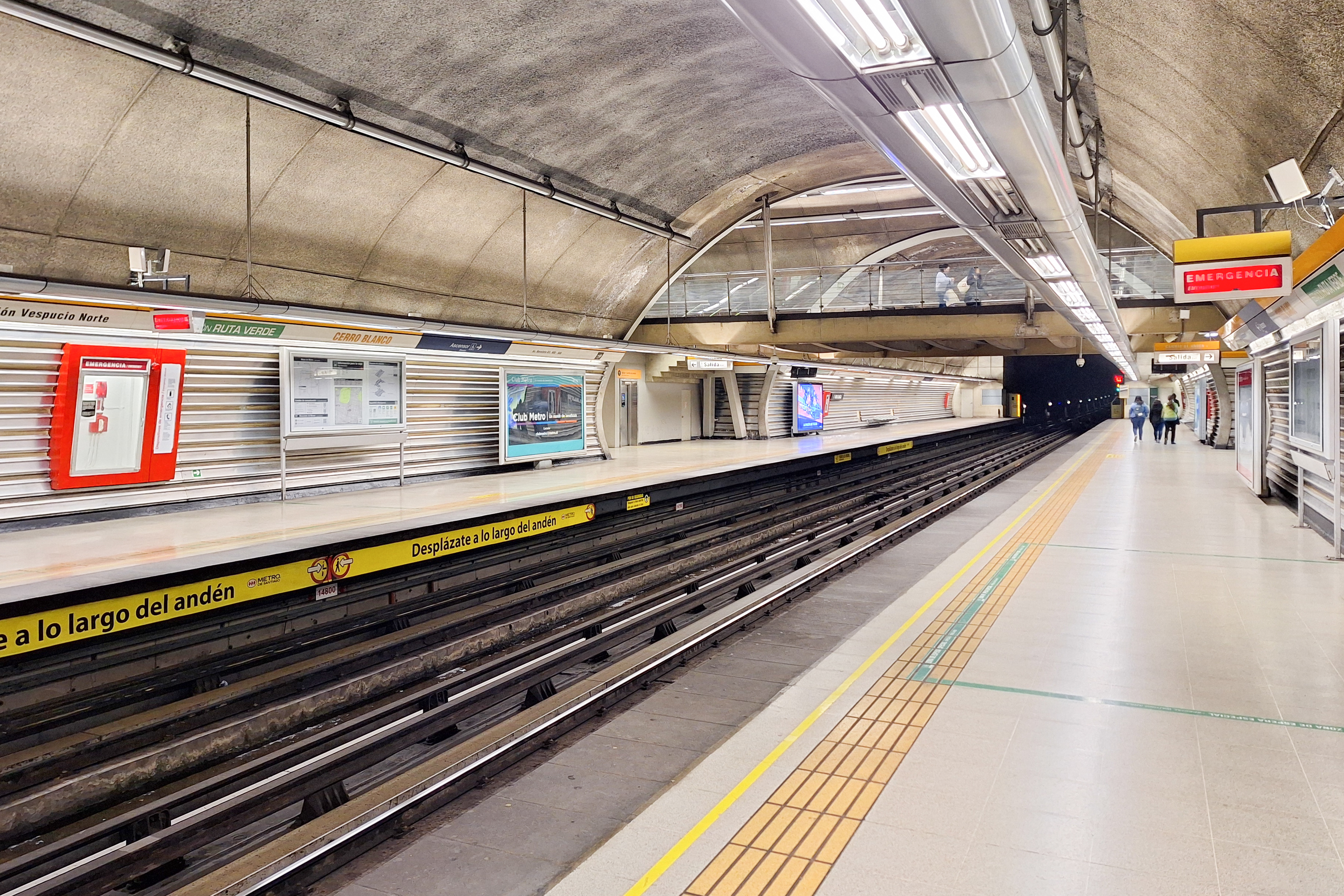

General information
- Coordinates: 33°25′19.26″S 70°38′41.43″W
- System: Santiago rapid transit
- Line: Line 2
- Platforms: 2 side platforms
- Tracks: 2
- Connections: Transantiago buses

Construction
- Accessible: yes

History
- Opened: September 8, 2004

Services
Preceding station	Santiago Metro	Following station
Cementerios towards Vespucio Norte	Line 2	Patronato towards Hospital El Pino
Location

Cerro Blanco is an underground metro station on the Line 2 of the Santiago Metro, in Santiago, Chile. The station takes its name from the nearby Cerro Blanco (White Hill). It was opened on 8 September 2004 as the northern terminus of the extension of the line from Puente Cal y Canto. On 25 November 2005 the line was extended further north to Einstein.
