= Iglesia de la Recoleta Franciscana =

National monument of Chile

Coordinates: 33°25′50″S 70°38′52″W

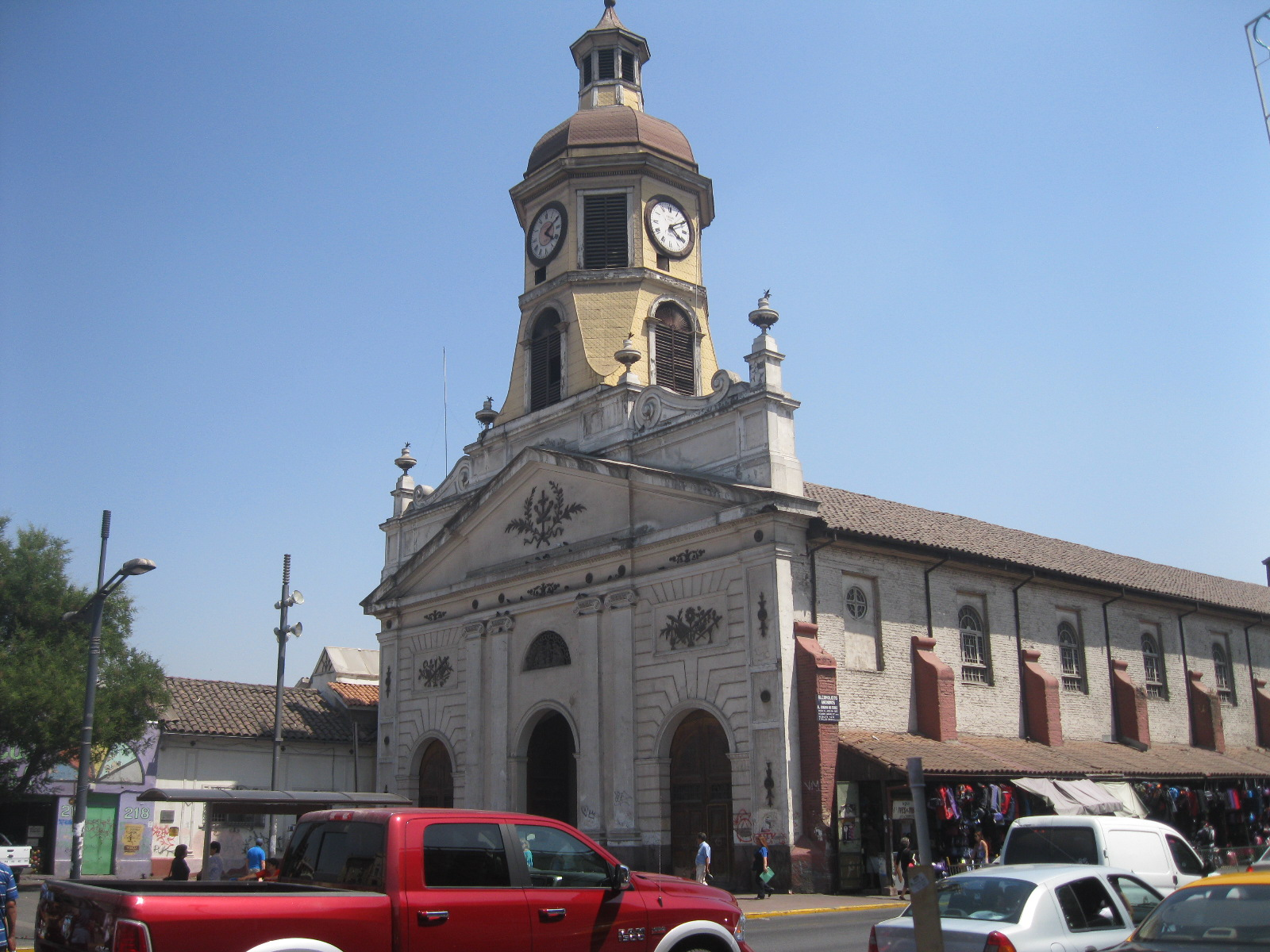
An oblique view

The Iglesia de la Recoleta Franciscana is a church in Recoleta, Santiago de Chile. The church was declared as a National Monument in 1973.

== History ==
A bronze fountain, which was the focal point of the Plaza de Armas until 1838, was installed for a period of time in front of the church.

The construction of the current church begin in 1843.

== Architecture ==
The church is built in the Neoclassical style with Tuscan influence. The main facade features three round arched entrances, one per each nave, and is decorated with Ionic pilasters on pedestal. The pilasters are topped by a triangular pediment, which in turn is topped by a volute ornamented parapet with cup-shaped finials.
