= Cementerios metro station =

Santiago metro station

Cementerios
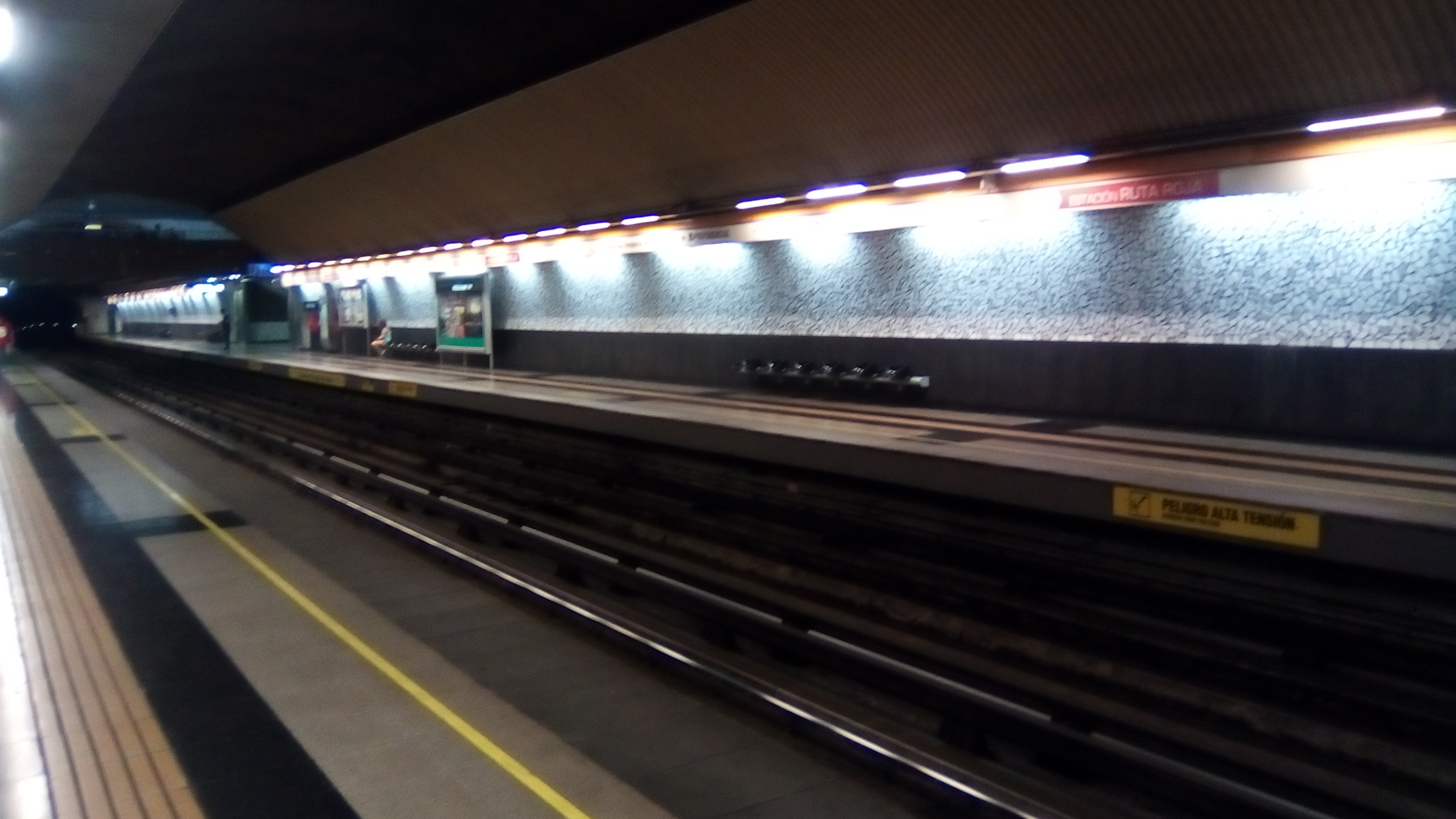

General information
- Coordinates: 33°24′50.53″S 70°38′36.91″W
- System: Santiago rapid transit
- Line: Line 2
- Platforms: 2 side platforms
- Tracks: 2
- Connections: Transantiago buses

Construction
- Accessible: yes

History
- Opened: November 25, 2005

Services
Preceding station	Santiago Metro	Following station
Einstein towards Vespucio Norte	Line 2	Cerro Blanco towards Hospital El Pino
Location

Cementerios is an underground metro station on Line 2 of the Santiago Metro, in Santiago, Chile. The word cementerios means "cemeteries" in English and the station is so named due to its surroundings of Recoleta Avenue that forms the borders of two cemeteries, the Santiago General Cemetery to the west and the smaller Catholic Cemetery to the east. The station was opened on November 25, 2005, as part of the extension of the line from Cerro Blanco to Einstein.
