= Cerro Blanco =

Mountain in Chile

Coordinates: 33°25′10.65″S 70°38′46.55″W

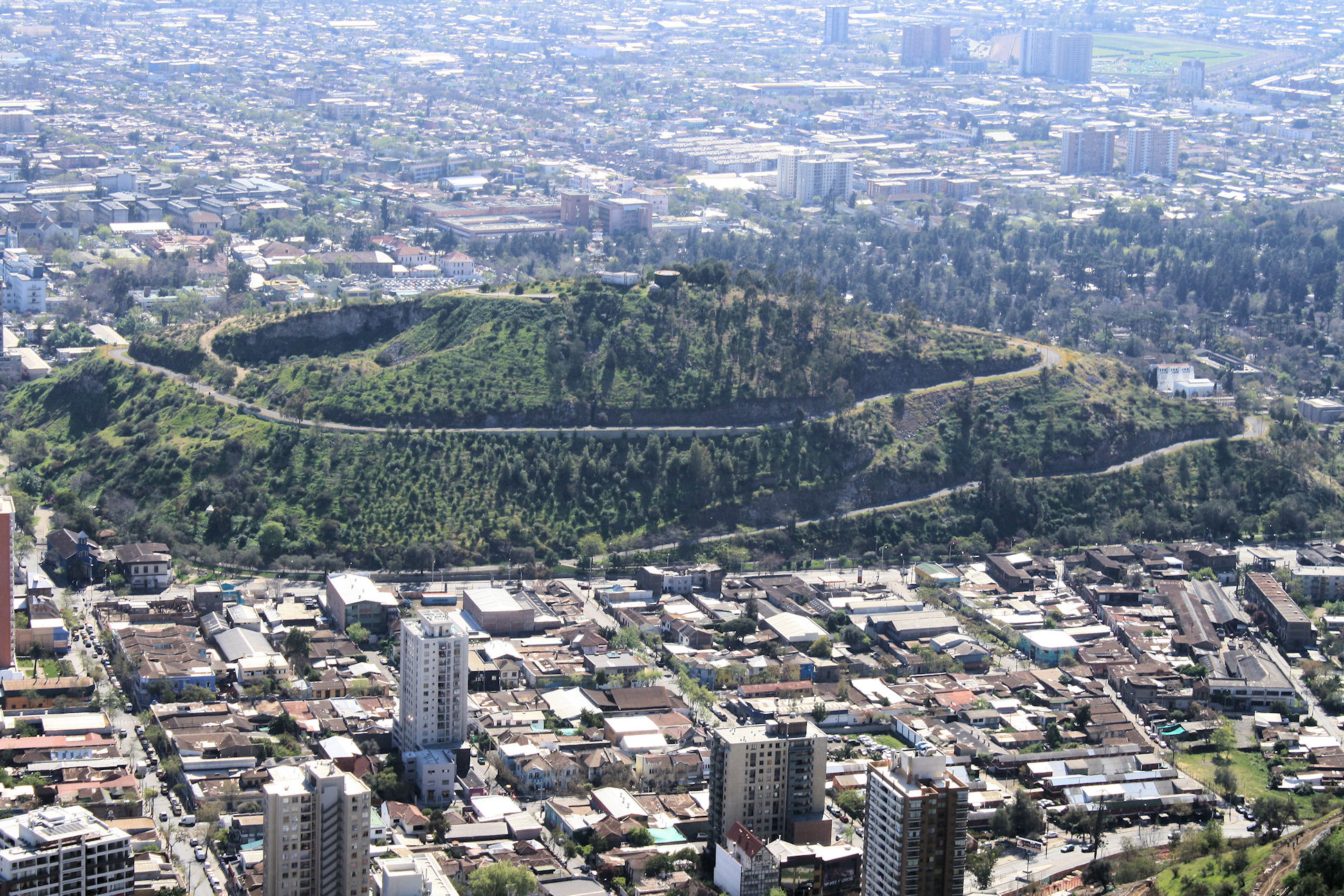
The hill as seen from San Cristóbal Hill

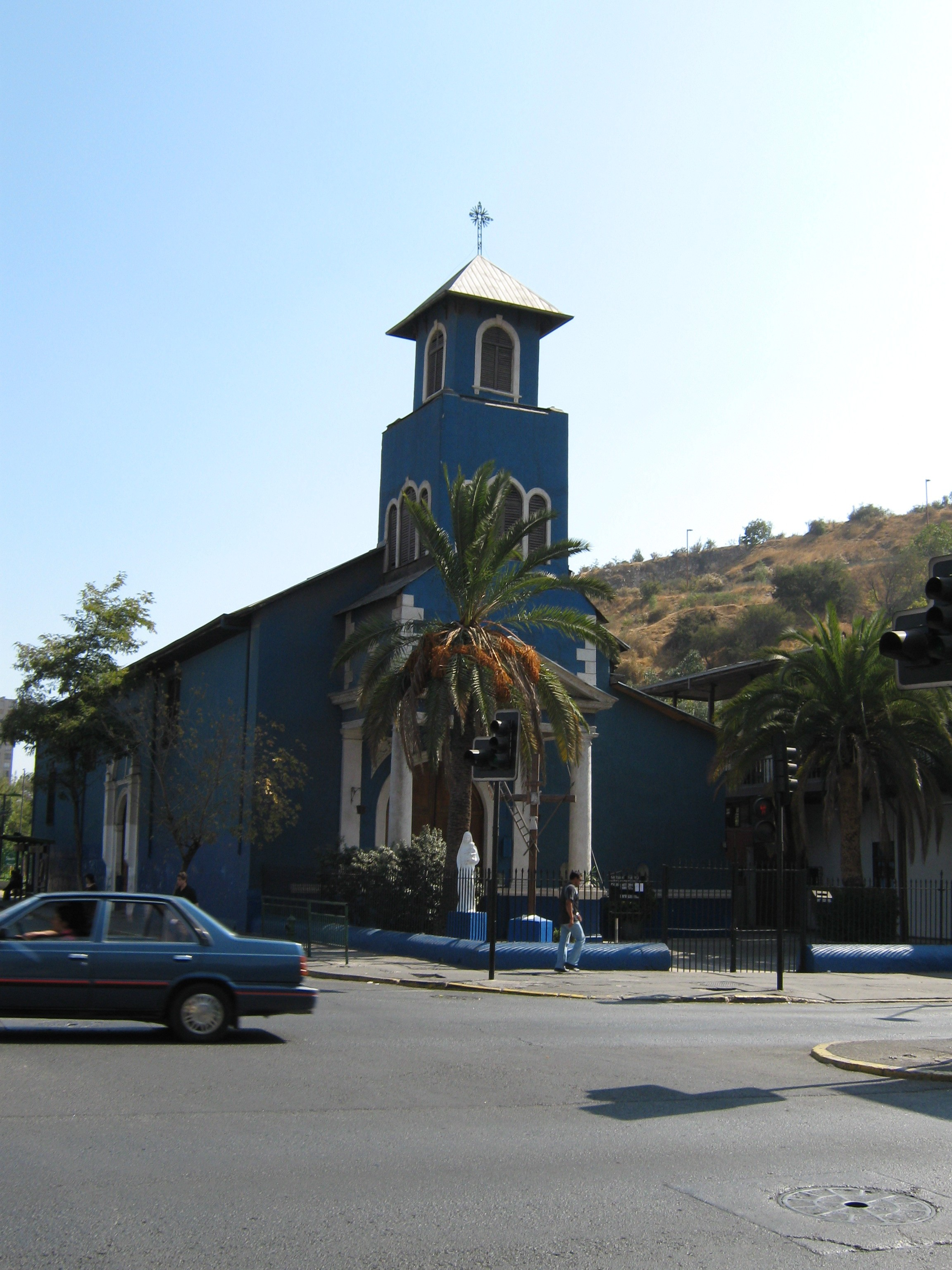
Iglesia de la Viñita

Cerro Blanco is a hill and historical landmark in the city of Santiago, Chile. This geographic feature rises 89 metres (292 ft) above the surrounding terrain and covers a surface area of 28 hectares (69 acres). It is bordered by Recoleta Avenue on the east, Santos Dumont Avenue on the south and La Unión Street on the north. The latter street separates the hill from the Cementerio General de Santiago. Cerro Blanco (Blanco is Spanish for white) is named so because the white habit used by the Dominicans who were owners of the land where the hill stands during the colonial period.

Completed in 1840, the Iglesia de la Viñita (Church of the Small Vineyard) is located at the lower southeast flank of Cerro Blanco, which is consecrated to Our Lady of Montserrat.

Stones extracted from a quarry on Cerro Blanco, were used in the construction of some historical buildings in Santiago, including the Santo Domingo Church.

Cerro Blanco metro station is named for the hill.
