= Barrio Patronato =

Coordinates: 33°25′48″S 70°38′40″W

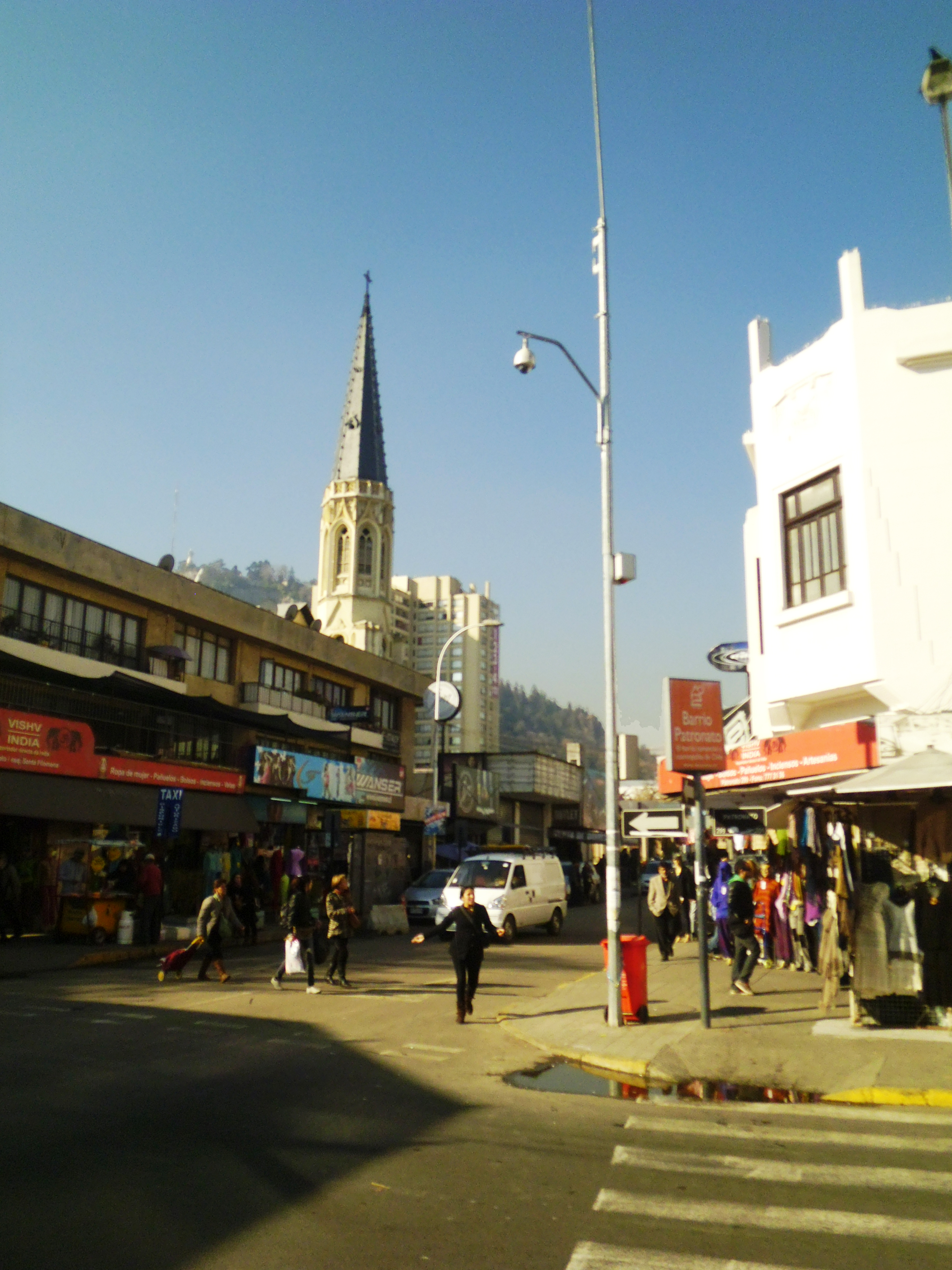
Patronato neighborhood.

Barrio Patronato (Patronato Neighborhood) is a traditional neighborhood in Recoleta, Santiago, Chile. It is bounded by Avenida Recoleta from the west, Bellavista Street from the south, Loreto Street from the east, and Dominica street from the north.

The area is served by its namesake Patronato metro station, which operates on Line 2 of the Santiago Metro system.

== History ==
The neighborhood developed into a prominent commercial district with the arrival of Middle Eastern (Arab, Palestinian, Syrian, Lebanese) immigrants from the late 19th century onwards. In early 20th century there was a massive influx of Christian Palestinians and Lebanese fleeing the Ottoman Empire due to religious persecution, and later prompted by deteriorating economic conditions and the outbreak of World War I. They were followed by Koreans, Chinese, Taiwanese, Peruvians and others from various other countries.

== Attractions ==
The neighborhood is known as a shopping area for affordable, trendy clothes. It is also home to La Vega Central Market, a large marketplace principally known for selling fresh fruits and vegetables originating from the Chilean Central Valley. The neighborhood hosts a number of Arabic restaurants. as well as South Korean and Vietnamese cuisine.

The neighborhood is also home to the historic church, Parroquia de Santa Filomena.
