= Patronato metro station =

Santiago metro station

Patronato
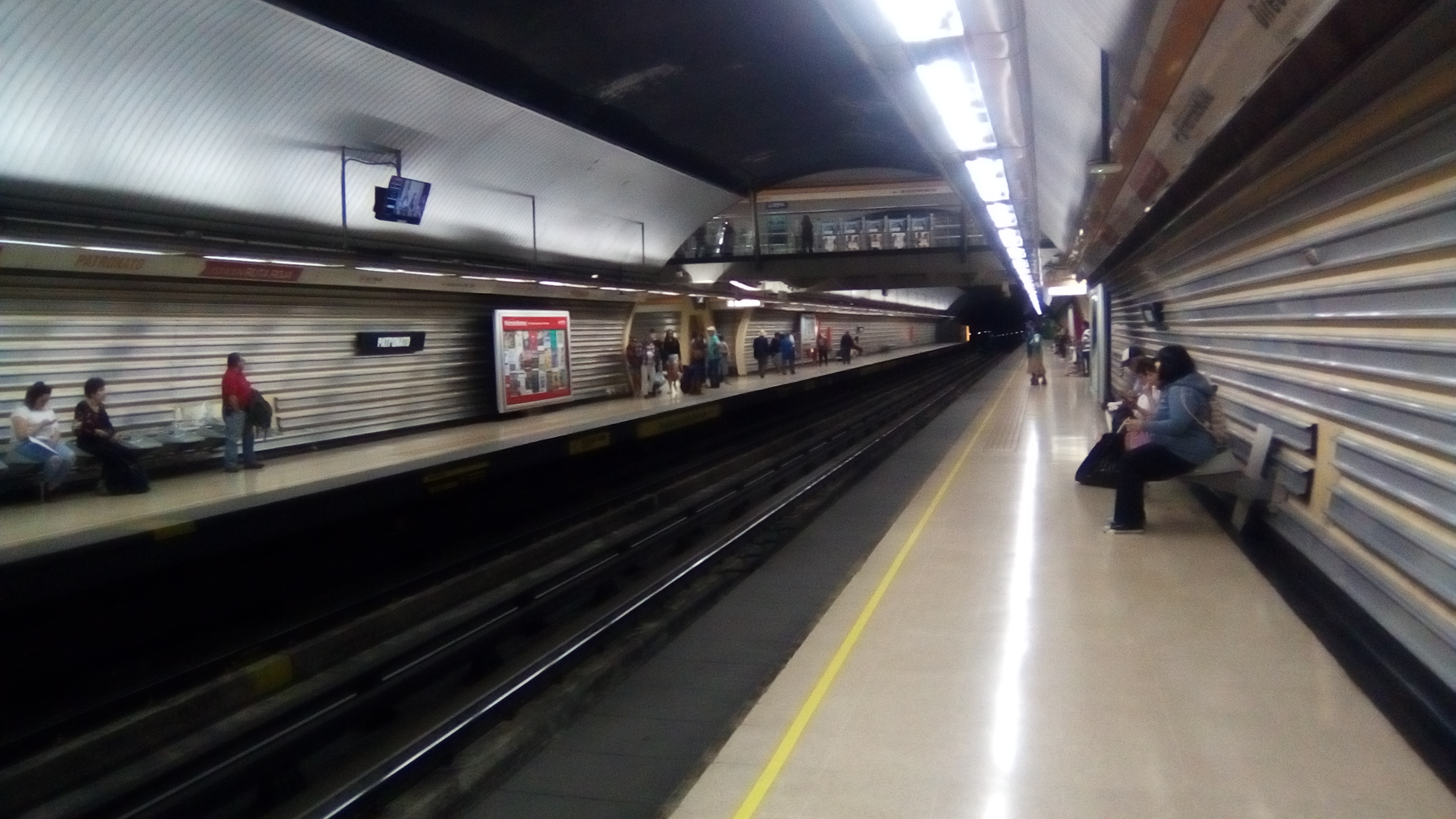

General information
- Coordinates: 33°25′46.57″S 70°38′49.65″W
- System: Santiago rapid transit
- Line: Line 2
- Platforms: 2 side platforms
- Tracks: 2
- Connections: Transantiago buses

Construction
- Accessible: yes

History
- Opened: September 8, 2004

Services
Preceding station	Santiago Metro	Following station
Cerro Blanco towards Vespucio Norte	Line 2	Puente Cal y Canto towards Hospital El Pino
Location

Patronato is an underground metro station on Line 2 of the Santiago Metro, in Santiago, Chile. The tunnel that connects the station with Puente Cal y Canto metro station passes under the Mapocho River. The station is named after the Patronato neighborhood, where it is located.

The station was opened on 8 September 2004 as part of the extension of the line from Puente Cal y Canto to Cerro Blanco.
