= Ominami =

Ominami, Ōminami or Oominami (written: 大南) is a Japanese surname. Notable people with the surname include:

- Carlos Ominami (born 1950), Chilean economist and politician
- Marco Enríquez-Ominami (born 1973), Chilean politician and adopted son of the former
- Hiromi Ominami (大南 博美, born 1975), Japanese long-distance runner
- Takami Ominami (大南 敬美, born 1975), Japanese long-distance runner
- Takuma Ominami (大南 拓磨, born 1997), Japanese footballer

== See also ==
- Marco Enríquez-Ominami, Chilean filmmaker and politician
