= Bautista van Schouwen =

Chilean politician (1943–1973)

- Born: Bautista van Schouwen Vasey; 3 April 1943; Tarapacá, Tarapacá Region, Chile
- Disappeared: 13 September 1973 (aged 30); Parroquia Capuchinos, Santiago, Chile
- Died: 23 December 1973 (aged 30); Villa Grimaldi, Peñalolén, Santiago, Chile
- Cause of death: Homicide
- Burial place: Patio 29
- Education: University of Concepción
- Occupations: Physician; politician
- Political party: Movement of the Revolutionary Left
- Spouses: Inés Enríquez Espinosa (m. 1968–1970) Astrid Haitmann (m. 1972)
- Children: 1
- Relatives: Edgardo Enríquez (ex father-in-law); Miguel Enríquez (ex brother-in-law)

Bautista van Schouwen Vasey (3 April 1943 – 13 December 1973) was a Chilean medical doctor and one of the founders of the Movement of the Revolutionary Left (MIR), a guerrilla organization that resisted the 1973 military coup led by Augusto Pinochet. At the time of the coup, he served on MIR's highest executive organs, the Comisión Política and the Secretariado, and had a bounty of 500,000 Escudos placed on him by the military government.

On 13 December 1973, van Schouwen was abducted at the Parroquia Capuchinos in Santiago after a priest sheltering him inadvertently revealed his location to military relatives. He and his lieutenant, Patricio Munita, were subsequently tortured and killed at the Villa Grimaldi detention center. For several years, the Pinochet regime concealed their assassinations, leaving van Schouwen's case labeled as desaparecido (disappeared) by human rights organizations.

== Biography ==
Bautista van Schouwen Vasey was the first son of Industrial Chemical Engineer Bautista van Schouwen Figueroa and Carlota María Valentina Vasey Crozier. He had two younger brothers named Carlos and Jorge. The family arrived in the Concepción region in 1953 and established first in a rural property in the nearby La Florida and then in Concepción. During the second half of his high-school studies he met Miguel Enriquez and Marcello Ferrada de Noli. These friends, together with an elder brother of Miguel Enríquez (Marco Antonio) and a new comrade they met at the first year of medical studies at the University of Concepcion (Jorge Gutiérrez Correa) started the secret group Movimiento Socialista Revolucionario in 1962. Other two members joined 1963–1964. The group first entered the socialist cell "Sierra Maestra" (also called "Espartaco", of the Socialist Party Youth in Concepción) led by Marcello Ferrada de Noli and who have according to their plans established earlier a "pie de terre" in the Socialist Party 1961. In fact, the group was from the beginning a fraction within the Socialist Party in Concepción. Historians have referred that this political group developed around their publication "Revolution" which first issue appeared in 1963.

Bautista van Schouwen Vasey married in the summer of 1968 to Inés Enríquez Espinosa, an English literature graduate and the only sister of Miguel Enríquez Espinosa, the best man of their wedding was their other old-time friend Marcello Ferrada de Noli. Bautista van Schouwen Vasey and Inés Enríquez Espinosa had one child named Pablo.

In October 1965 Bautista van Schouwen Vasey participated in the foundation of the MIR in Santiago and was elected at that opportunity member of MIR's Central Committee. Two years after was elected chairman of MIR's Regional Committee for Concepción, the largest in the MIR, nationwide. In 1966 he was President of the Medical Student Union of the University of Concepción and led with Nelson Gutierrez (President of the Sociology Students Union), Marcello Ferrada de Noli (President of the Philosophy Students Union) and Luis Moreno (President of the Engineer Students Union) a long, and at times bloody, struggle for a university reform at the conservative University of Concepción. Together with medical student Luciano Cruz (another notorious MIR leader, died 1971) and other students of prominent participation in such struggle – mainly from the Movimiento Universitario de Izquierda, MUI - they finally succeeded in 1968 obtaining a university reform which became model for the student movement in the country elsewhere. Years 1968-1969 the student-movement in Chile had scored notable victories but at the same time increased a confrontation with the authorities both at the universities and government. It was at that time when Bautista Van Schouwen Vasey and Miguel Enríquez Espinosa published the document De las luchas estudiantiles a las filas de la Revolución ("From the students' struggles to the ranks of the Revolution").

In 1969 the Christian Democratic government of Eduardo Frei declared MIR out-law and many MIR cadres had to pass to clandestine life. The government implemented a nationwide persecution of the thirteen most known leaders of the organization at that epoch (among those wanted were Miguel Enríquez, Luciano Cruz, Bautista Van Schouwen, Nelson Gutierrez, Marcello Ferrada de Noli, Anibal Matamala, Jose Bordas, José Goñi, Juan Saavedra Gorriategy, and others). Bautista Van Schouwen was however never captured. The cause against the MIR was eventually dismissed the year after by the new government of Salvador Allende through an amnesty decree. By then Bautista Van Schouwen had moved to Santiago and had taken the political leadership and the editor-in-chief post of El Rebelde, MIR's official newspaper.

Bautista van Schouwen Vasey graduated in 1968 from medical school with the second best marks of his promotion and he took afterwards an internship and postdoctoral training in neurology. He left those activities shortly thereafter for full-time dedication to the political and military activities of MIR, in preparation to resist the imminent 1973 Chilean coup d'état against the Salvador Allende government which finally took place on 11 September 1973. Some time before in 1972 Bautista Van Schouwen Vasey was married for the second time to Astrid Heitmman, a registered nurse at the university hospital.

== Ideological stance ==
The ideological stance among the early generation of youngsters from Concepción that founded MIR in 1965 correspond to a variety of political ideologies ranging from Social-liberalism to Marxist and Trotskyite positions. Although official declarations of the epoch, MIR had not a truly uniform ideological stand until the Congress of 1967 (see Movement of the Revolutionary Left) in which prevailed the Leninists positions represented by the new elected General Secretary Miguel Enriquez. Bautista Van Schouwen did follow his friend Miguel Enríquez in this regard. However, it has been put forward that van Schouwen would have been a closer follower to the doctrine of Rosa Luxemburg, favouring general strikes over cadre-organization political work as in Leninists traditions. Other authors of the epoch have placed Van Schouwen's earlier ideological positions in the line of socialist humanism and also sympathetic with social-anarchist positions. Contrary to what "official" versions have maintained, historians have established – based in interview testimonies of Marco Antonio Enríquez, a History Professor at Sorbonne ( also referred above as elder brother of Miguel Enríquez) - that Bautista Van Schouwen did not participate in the elaboration of the first historical document in the foundation of MIR, The "Insurrectional Thesis". Bautista Van Schouwen was nevertheless a prolific writer of political documents and he was trusted by his peers the political and ideological leadership of MIR's official newspaper "El Rebelde". The last known MIR-document in which Bautista Van Schouwen had personally participated was the situation-analysis of December 1973 authored by the Secretariado of MIR (the MIR executive committee, led by Miguel Enríquez).

== Demise and whereabouts ==
Bautista Van Schouwen was killed while in captivity by DINA late on the night of December 13, 1973, with a bullet to the head; his body was later abandoned under a tree, at a crossroads in the proximities of Villa Grimaldi, his body again perforated from the back with multiple bullets from a machine gun. Later on another military patrol discovered the corpses of Munita and Van Schouwen (with no identifications) and – unaware of the above facts – followed routine and took them to the forensic station in Santiago. There was an autopsy performed, and the victims' identities were also established, which was reported thereafter to the police. When this report reached DINA, their operatives confiscated the corpses and ordered a secret burial, at night, in Patio 29 at the "Cementerio General" of Santiago. On the 16 February 1974, again in a secret operation – this time presumably under the direct orders of Augusto Pinochet to General Ernesto Baeza, the Interior Minister- DINA arranged the exhumation and incineration of Bautista Van Schouwen's remains. The secret killing of Bautista Van Schouwen had remarkable consequences.

The MIR let it be known for many years that Van Schouwen was instead alive, under captivity by the military, but heavily wounded due to torture. MIR even published a picture of Van Schouwen depicting him with bandages, supposedly imprisoned in a military medical compound. On the other hand, the military gave contradictory information to the public; first the interior ministry informed, and echoed by the press (17 August 1974) that Bautista Van Schouwen had been captured on December 13, 1973, and that he was "in custody at an undisclosed location". Later that year the military retracted the information on that Van Schouwen was in custody in Chile and affirmed instead that he had "escaped to Cuba on the 2nd of February" 1974. Nevertheless, Amnesty International informed in their first report about the human-rights violations by the Chilean Junta that Van Schouwen was held prisoner and had been transported to a variety of detention sites by the military. The Chilean human-rights organizations, for their part, for years went on demanding clarity on the "disappearance" of Bautista Van Schouwen and his case was included in a variety of judicial processes that ensued around the missing ones in Chile (those whose whereabouts were unknown). As late as 1998 his friend and MIR co-founder Marcello Ferrada de Noli, then a university professor in Norway, filled in European courts a criminal case against Augusto Pinochet for the assassination or disappearance of Bautista Van Schouwen and Edgardo Enriquez. Pinochet was then under house arrest in London but was ultimately granted by the British government returning to Chile without processes in Europe.

In 2007 an Appeal Court in Santiago de Chile processed the former DINA commander, Army General (R) Marcelo Moren Brito, for the criminal killing of Bautista Van Schouwen and his lieutenant Patricio Munita.

In 2013 Bautista's son Pablo began legal proceedings against the Chilean state in a civil action. The court hearing with full witness testimonies began on January 31, 2017, in Santiago.
