= Schouwen (disambiguation) =

Schouwen is the name of a former island of the Dutch province of Zeeland.

Schouwen may also refer to:

== People ==
- Bautista van Schouwen (1943-1973), Chilian Movement of the Revolutionary founder

== Place ==
- Schouwen-Duiveland, Netherlands municipality
