= Santiago Temple =

Santiago Temple may refer to one of the religious temples in Santiago, Chile:

- The Santiago Bahá'í Temple is the Santiago Baháʼí House of Worship of the South American continent, the last continental House of Worship to be completed.
- Santiago Chile Temple, which is the 26th constructed and 24th operating temple of the Church of Jesus Christ of Latter-day Saints.
- Votive Temple of Maipú, a Catholic church located in the Chilean town of Maipú, in the Santiago metro area.

See also Category:Churches in Santiago, Chile, and the Memorial for the Disappeared.
