= Arnoldo Camú =

- Born: Arnoldo Camú Veloso; 1 June 1937; Santiago, Chile
- Died: 24 September 1973 (aged 36); Santiago, Chile
- Cause of death: Homicide
- Resting place: Patio 29 (1973–1996); Memorial for the Disappeared (1996–)
- Education: University of Chile
- Occupations: Lawyer; politician; legal advisor
- Political party: Socialist Party of Chile
- Spouse: Celsa Parrau Tejos (m. 1961)
- Children: 2

Arnoldo Camú Veloso (1937—September 24, 1973) was a Chilean lawyer, politician and legal advisor to the government of Salvador Allende. He was a member of the Political Bureau of the Socialist Party of Chile. Camú was killed in the street, allegedly by Chilean government agents shortly following the 1973 Chilean coup d'état. He had been hiding since 11 September and was 36 years old during the incident.

Responsibility for a 1989 bombing which damaged windows and injured a security guard at the US Embassy in Chile was claimed by a group calling itself the "Arnoldo Camú Command".
