= Camu =

Camu may refer to

- Camu (name)
- Camú River in the northern Dominican Republic
- Barraute-Camu, French commune
- Myrciaria dubia, a small tree from the Amazon rainforest, called camu camu
