= Carlos Ominami =

Chilean economist and politician (born 1950)

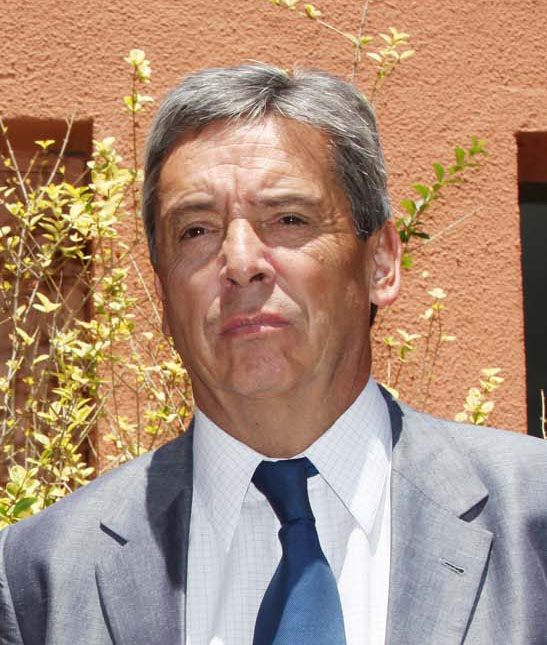
- Carlos Ominami in 2010

Member of the Senate
- In office 11 March 1994 – 11 March 2010
- Constituency: Circunscripción 5, Valparaíso Region

Minister of Economy
- In office 11 March 1990 – 28 September 1992
- President: Patricio Aylwin
- Preceded by: Pedro Larrondo

Personal details
- Born: Carlos Octavio Ominami Pascual; June 18, 1950 (age 75) Santiago, Chile
- Party: Socialist Party (1984–2009)
- Other political affiliations: Socialist Convergence (1978–1983); Revolutionary Left Movement (1968–1975)
- Spouse(s): Manuela Gumucio Rivas (divorced); Maïté Albagly Giroux
- Children: Marco Enríquez-Ominami (adoptive)
- Occupation: Economist; commercial engineer; politician
- Website: ominami2009.blogspot.com

Academic background
- Education: University of Chile; University of Paris-X

Carlos Octavio Ominami Pascual (born 18 June 1950) is a Chilean economist, commercial engineer, politician and former member of the Socialist Party of Chile.

== Early career and education ==
Carlos Octavio Ominami Pascual was born on 18 June 1950 in Santiago, Chile to Edith Pascual Pascual (1928–2022) and Carlos Segundo Ominami Daza (1932–1996). Ominami's mother was of French descent whilst his father was of Japanese descent. Ominami's grandfather, Carlos Ominami Maza, was a Japanese navy officer and hairdresser who immigrated to Iquique in 1914.

Ominami was educated at Instituto Nacional. In 1969, Ominami enrolled at Faculty of Economic and Administrative Sciences at the University of Chile and studied economics and commercial engineering. Ominami later graduated with a BS in economics.

In 1968, Ominami joined the Revolutionary Left Movement (MIR), remaining a member until 1975. Ominami was a member of the University Students Front (Spanish: Frente de Estudiantes Revolucionarios) until 1973.

== Exile ==
Following the 1973 Chilean coup d'état Ominami sought asylum at the Embassy of Belgium. In June 1974, Ominami went into exile in Brussels before resettling in Paris three months later. In Paris Ominami obtained a Ph.D. in economics from University of Paris-X (present-day, Paris Nanterre University).

Between 1975–1978, Ominami worked as a researcher at the Centre d'Études Prospectives d'Économie Mathématique Appliquées à la Planification, and as a research officer at the French National Centre for Scientific Research during 1978–1984. From 1981–1983, Ominami also worked as an adviser at the Research Institute for Development.

From 1978 to 1983 Ominami was active in Socialist Convergence (Spanish: Convergencia Socialista). (Note: Not to be confused with the Mexican Trotskyist group Socialist Convergence) Then he joined the Chilean Socialist Party (PSC), participating actively in its reconstruction.

== Return to Chile ==
He returned to Chile in 1984, working as adviser to the Latin American International Relations programme (RIAL), a branch of the United Nations Economic Commission for Latin America and the Caribbean (CEPAL) and between 1987 and 1989 he helped to set up the Latin American Centre for Economy and International Politics (CLEPI).

=== Role in the "Concertación" ===
After 1985, he began to emerge as one of the best-regarded left-wing economists, and in 1989 became assistant coordinator of the economic programme of the Concertación.

From March 1990 to September 1992 he served as Minister for the Economy under President Patricio Aylwin. In 1993 he supported the nomination for President by the Concertación of Ricardo Lagos, who was defeated by the Christian Democrat (DC) candidate Eduardo Frei.

The same year he was elected as Senator for Constituency No. 5, in the Valparaíso region, coming top of the poll with 33.31% of the votes. At the end of 2001 he was re-elected, ahead of his DC rival Ignacio Walker. As Senator he focussed on economic affairs and was chair of the standing committee on Business, and a member of the Public Works, Health, and other committees.

In June 2009 he announced that he was leaving the PSC in order to support his son's presidential ambitions. Standing as an Independent candidate, he was defeated in the parliamentary elections in December of that year.

In June 2011, Ominami was awarded the Japanese honour "The Order of the Rising Sun" by the Emperor Akihito in recognition of his contribution towards improving relations between Japan and Chile.

== Personal life ==
He was married to the journalist and sociologist Manuela Gumucio Rivas, daughter of the former parliamentarian Rafael Agustín Gumucio and ex-wife of the general secretary of the Revolutionary Left Movement (MIR), Miguel Enríquez (1944–1974). He is now in relationship with Maïté Albagly Giroux. His only (adoptive) child is Marco Enríquez-Ominami, the offspring of his ex wife from a previous relationship, whom he adopted as his own son from an early age.

== Published works ==
- Nationalisations et Internationalisation, with Ch. A. Michalet. La Découverte/Maspero, Paris, 1983. 163 p.
- Le Tiers Monde dans la Crise. La Découverte, París, 1984. 246 p.
- The third industrial revolution (La tercera revolución industrial). G.E.L., Buenos Aires, 1986. 482 p.
- To Change Life (Cambiar la Vida) (co-author). Editorial Melquíades, Santiago de Chile, 1988. 131 p.
- Ripostes a la Crise en Amerique Latine (co-author). L'Harmatan, París, 1988. 189 p.
- The Entry of Chile into international markets (La inserción de Chile en los mercados internacionales), with R. Madrid. Prospel-Cesoc, Santiago de Chile, 1989. 93 p.
- The Challenge of Uncertainty (El desafío de la incertidumbre) (co-author). Editorial Nueva Sociedad, Santiago de Chile, 1988. 206 p.
- Large Strategic Manoeuvres (Grandes maniobras estratégicas). Editorial Nueva Sociedad, Santiago de Chile, 1990. 210 p.
- Political Animals: father-son dialogues (Animales políticos: diálogos filiales), with Marco Enríquez-Ominami. Planeta, Santiago de Chile, 2004.
- The Silenced Debate (2009) (El debate silenciado: un testimonio). LOM, Santiago de Chile, 2009.
- Secrets of the Concertación (Secretos de la Concertación: recuerdos para el futuro). Planeta, Santiago de Chile, 2011. 355 p. Chilean National Congress Library catalogue
