= Swedish Doctors for Human Rights =

Swedish organization

Swedish Professors and Doctors for Human Rights
- Founded: Sept 2014
- Founder: Marcello Ferrada de Noli
- Location: Sweden
- Key people: Prof. Marcello Ferrada de Noli (Chairman) Prof. Anders Romelsjö (Vice chairman); Prof. Marita Troye-Blomberg; Dr. Alberto Gutierrez; Dr. Leif Elinder; Dr. Ove B. Johansson; Dr. Martin Gelin; Dr. Lena Oske The late Dr. Armando Popa
- Website: SWEDHR

Swedish Doctors for Human Rights (SWEDHR), (official name Swedish Professors and Doctors for Human Rights) is a Sweden-based non-governmental organization (NGO) that previously researched and published opinion pieces on international affairs and campaigned in support of doctors and anti-war activists persecuted or imprisoned on issues of civil liberties and freedom of expression. SWEDHR claimed to shed light on "health issues of war crimes & Human Rights abuses worldwide", and it acknowledged being an "alternative NGO" with regard to mainstream organizations. Ensuring the views presented in its publications tended to differ from, or contradict, those of Human Rights Watch, Amnesty International Sweden and other organizations. Up to mainly 2019, SWEDHR's primary focus has been the Julian Assange international case. During 2020 and onwards, the focus of the organization has been solely on issues around the COVID-19 pandemic.

== Organization ==
Swedish Doctors for Human Rights was founded in September 2014 by Marcello Ferrada de Noli, a Swedish professor emeritus and doctor of medicine from the Karolinska Institute. Ferrada de Noli and two other members of the foundation board, Professor Anders Romelsjö and pediatrician doctor Leif Elinder were active in the mainstream media debate of Sweden since before the foundation of SWEDHR. The majority of the organization’s members being medical doctors, but it also included professors and doctors from diverse medical-related disciplines. The organization published a magazine online called The Indicter, which became independent from Swedhr in 2017. The organization ended its activities in January 2020. It explained that after Sweden dropped the legal case against Assange in 2019, and the international focus on the case moved from Sweden to the UK following the extradition requested by the US, Swedhr began to participate in activities of a new international group of doctors called Doctors For Assange, based in London. In December 2019, Doctors For Assange thanked SWEDHR “for taking us to over 100 signatories”. As of February 2020, the new group reached “nearly 200 medical professionals,” according to The Washington Times. In September 2020, SWEDHR announced reassuming activities solely focused on issues derived from the implementation of international strategies in combating the COVID-19 pandemic.

== Positions taken by SWEDHR ==
The organization’s main concern in 2015-2019 has been the Julian Assange case, which Swedish Dagens Nyheter has named first among SWEDHR issues. It participated in appeals to the Swedish authorities and other governments and to international organizations, addressing human rights and health issues. In 2015, it argued that the prolonged use by Sweden of the European Arrest Warrant on Assange issued in 2010, without a decision of taking the case to court in a reasonable time, would infringe the UN International Covenant on Civil and Political Rights, matter later established by the UN Working Group on Arbitrary Detention. In 2016 it advocated for asylum to Edward Snowden in the EU.

It also reported on human rights situations in Chile, issues of torture accountability, and investigated civilian casualties of drone attacks in Afghanistan and Yemen. In March 2017, SWEDHR published results of an investigation of two videos the organization Syrian Civil Defense uploaded in 2015, showing medical rescue interventions during the Sarmin chemical attack. SWEDHR deemed the procedures as “anti-medical and not-saving”, and presented the findings at a conference of the Club Suisse de la Presse. The Syrian ambassador to the UN made use of the SWEDHR allegations at the United Nations Security Council (UNSC) in April 2017. Later that year, SWEDHR questioned the OPCW-UN Joint Investigative Mechanism report on the Khan Shaykhun chemical attack, claiming that the report was “proven inaccurate, politically biased”. The SWEDHR assessment was annexed as official document of the UNSC after a proposal by the Permanent Representative of Russia to the United Nations, Vasily Nebenzya. In 2019, SWEDHR endorsed a complaint to the permanent representatives of States parties at the OPCW, on alleged misreporting in the OPCW investigation of the gas attack in Douma, Syria, 2018.

During 2015-2018, SWEDHR advocated against alleged human rights abuses on Swedish cardiologist Fikru Maru, held in custody in Ethiopia until 2018. It also denounced aerial attacks against hospitals run by Médecins Sans Frontières in Afghanistan. The organization has criticized Sweden’s arms sales to the Saudi-led coalition in the Yemeni Civil War. In 2019, it opposed the Swedish government’s decision of not signing the Treaty on the Prohibition of Nuclear Weapons, and endorsed “Letter in Defence of World Peace”, protesting US notices of abandoning the Intermediate-Range Nuclear Forces Treaty INFT. In 2015, SWEDHR commented on opinions made by the Swedish Minister of Defense Peter Hultqvist. The minister had stated that “bilateral cooperation with the US is important and it should deepen”, SWEDHR argued that “Minister Hultqvist had not shown that a deepening of the Sweden-USA cooperation would be better than to instead deepen our neutrality stance.”

Swedhr positions regarding the COVID-19 pandemic have in the main included criticism of what the oprganization has viewed as a discriminatory health-treatment of the elderly population in Sweden, opposing to strategies they say were striving to rapid "herd immunity", and advocating for stricter restrictions, and favoring widespread vaccination.

== Criticism ==
In 2017-2018, several European mainstream media (MSM) pointed out the frequency Swedhr was interviewed in Russian media, and also criticised the use that Russian authorities and media made of SWEDHR investigations and statements. SWEDHR published its respective rebuttals in The Indicter, arguing the MSM criticism did not address the arguments or results of their investigations, but focused in the issue of the several interviews in Russian media in the period. In a statement in the journal of the Swedish Medical Association, Swedhr declared the organization is "absolutely independent" and “we retain the right to freely express opinions on war crimes, violations of human rights, and governmental intervention in private life and civil liberties”. In an interview by Swedish newspaper DN on 2 April 2018, the Swedhr chairman replied, "I stand for what I've said to those channels. These are the same things I would have said to Dagens Nyheter or Svenska Dagbladet".

In April 2017, the results of the Swedish investigation on the 2015 White Helmets rescuing videos in Sarmin were broadly reported. Some accounts said Swedhr had accused White Helmets of “killing children for fake videos,” which was immediately denied by the organization. Arab News reported 17 April 2017: “The news was based on reports falsely attributed to Swedish doctors. The irony is that this fake news that has continued to spread, even after the Swedish organization attributed and linked to the report refuted it. In a published statement confirming that it analyzed some videos published by the White Helmets, SWEDHR did not accuse them of killing children.”

The online publication Coda Story contested the Swedhr investigation on the White Helmets video, and said that a group of doctors “agreed that the individuals in the (White Helmets) video did not appear to be carrying out a resuscitation attempt according to accepted guidelines. All of them, however, said it would be impossible to conclude from the brief video that the scene was staged.” In its rebuttal, Swedhr pointed out that only one of the doctors in the group of five referred to in the Coda Story article was identified. It also challenged Coda Story to organize an open international panel of medical experts to assess the Swedhr conclusions.
