= Miguel Enríquez (politician) =

Chilean politician and physician

Miguel Enríquez Espinosa

Secretary General of the Revolutionary Left Movement
- In office 1967–1974
- Preceded by: Enrique Sepúlveda
- Succeeded by: Andrés Pascal Allende

Personal details
- Born: Miguel Humberto Enríquez Espinosa; 27 March 1944 Talcahuano, Biobío Region, Chile
- Died: 5 October 1974 (aged 30) Santiago, Chile
- Party: Revolutionary Left Movement (1965–1974); Socialist Party of Chile (1962–1964)
- Spouse: Alejandra Pizarro Romero (m. 1968; div. 1970)
- Domestic partners: Manuela Gumucio; Carmen Castillo Echeverría
- Children: 3, including Marco Enríquez-Ominami
- Parents: Edgardo Enríquez; Raquel Espinosa Townsend
- Relatives: Inés Enríquez Frödden (Aunt)
- Education: University of Concepción, 1961–1968
- Occupation: Physician; politician; revolutionary

Miguel Humberto Enríquez Espinosa (Spanish pronunciation: [miˈɣel enˈrikes espiˈnosa]; March 27, 1944 – October 5, 1974) was a physician and a founder of the Chilean Marxist-Leninist urban guerrilla Movement of the Revolutionary Left (MIR), founded in 1965. He was General Secretary of the MIR between 1967 and his death in 1974.

After the September 11, 1973, coup Enriquez led the political-military resistance of MIR against the newly established dictatorship.

After a year of Enríquez operating clandestinely, Pinochet's secret police, the DINA, discovered his safe-house in the working class district of San Miguel in Santiago. On October 5, 1974, his house was surrounded by DINA agents backed by heavily armed security forces personnel with an armored personnel carrier and a helicopter. He was wounded in the beginning of the assault covering the retreat of his pregnant wife (Carmen Castillo, also wounded) and two other men that fled. He received ten bullet wounds, including one to the head.

His son, Marco Enríquez-Ominami, is a prominent politician in Chile, and was a candidate for the presidential election of 2009, and then again in 2013, 2017 and in 2021, losing all of the elections.

== Biography ==
Miguel Enríquez was born in Talcahuano, Chile, into the upper middle class family of Edgardo Enríquez Frödden and Raquel Espinosa Townsend. His father Enríquez Frödden had been a prominent academic and political figure in Chile. He was a medical doctor and professor of anatomy of the University of Concepción, Chile, where he was principal (1969–1972). He had been a prominent figure in the Partido Radical (Radical Party) - in 1973 and he was appointed by Salvador Allende to the position of Minister of Education in the Popular Unity government. Dr. Edgardo Enríquez Frödden served also during 25 years as medical-surgeon in the Chilean Navy, as commander of the hospital at the Navy Base in Talcahuano and with a one-year-long specialization in the USA. His mother Espinosa Townsend graduated from the School of Law of the University of Concepción, Chile. Miguel had also two uncles which were Senators at the Chilean Parliament, Humberto Enríquez Frödden (Miguel's second name) and Inés Enríquez Frödden. Miguel did his first school years at Saint John's, an exclusive English private school in Concepción. He continued his secondary education at "Liceo Enrique Molina" where at the age of 13 and 15, respectively, he met Marcello Ferrada de Noli and Bautista van Schouwen Vasey. With these friends and his elder brothers Marco Antonio and Edgardo Enríquez, Miguel would constitute at the end of the fifties the first core of comrades around his socialist-libertarian project of those early years. The same group would initiate a few years later the political nucleus at the youth section of the Socialist Party which under Miguel's university years evolved to the foundation of MIR.

Enríquez entered the University of Concepción, Chile, at the age of 16 to study medicine. At the age of 23 he graduated with a Medical Degree, which he obtained with "greatest distinction" ("distinción máxima"), obtaining the second highest marks in his class (first and third were respectively Jorge Gutiérrez Correa and Bautista van Schouwen, also militants of MIR). This distinction earned Miguel at the same time a specialization scholarship to attend the prestigious Neurological Institute of Santiago de Chile. He specialized and was trained as a Neurologist.

Enríquez was an avid reader of both classical literature and political philosophy. Being also fluent in English he had a wider option of classical texts. Miguel fancied authors from Fyodor Dostoevsky, Hermann Hesse and Ernest Hemingway to utopian socialists and classical anarchists. He was also a debater, citing works of world history and being well read in the literature of Lenin, Leon Trotsky and Rosa Luxemburg. He studied the Chinese Communist Revolution, while also having detailed knowledge of the events of the Cuban revolution and an extensive understanding of Chilean history. He was a Carrerist; an admirer of Manuel Rodríguez; critical of the historical role of Bernardo O'Higgins and he enjoyed engaging in discussion with people who held views different from his.

In 1962, during his second year at the university in Concepción, Miguel officially entered the youth organization of the Chilean Socialist Party (Federación Juvenil Socialista, FJS) together with his brother M. Antonio and some close peers of the medical school. Enríquez' first political activities are conducted in the Spartacus cell ("núcleo Espartaco"), a cell organized in advance by his friend Marcello Ferrada de Noli who for that purpose had entered the Socialist Party a year before. The group became integrated by Miguel Enríquez and his brother Marco Antonio, his old-time friends Bautista van Schouwen Vasey and Marcello Ferrada de Noli (cell's leader), Martin Hernández, and a new university peers Miguel had met at the University of Concepción (Jorge Gutiérrez Correa). All these young men - except Martin Hernández - left the Socialist Party together with Miguel Enríquez in January 1964 amid a stormy National Convention held in the southern city of Concepción.

Senator Raúl Ampuero - the national chairman of the party - had long been dealing with Enríquez's public criticism of a party strategy characterised as "reformist" and alien, according to Enríquez, to the working classes' interest. Chairman Ampuero, supported by a majority of the convention delegates, proceeded to marginalize Enríquez and his closest colleagues of the Spartacus cell from the Socialist Party, some of them in strategic leading positions inside the "Comité Regional de la Juventud Socialista". Miguel Enríquez was then 21 years old. In fact, Miguel had already organized (1963) a clandestine fraction called "Movimiento Socialista Revolucionario", or "MSR", integrated by a handful of his peers and his two elder brothers Marco Antonio and Edgardo Enríquez. Edgardo had had the task of developing the MSR fraction at the Socialist Party in Santiago.

After the events of February 1964 in Concepción, this entire group, together with other small forces mainly from Santiago de Chile, entered the short-lived political group called "VRM". During the VRM-period (1964–1965) some few new cadres - each of them with previous experiences in other political organizations - were recruited by Miguel's group. Among them Luciano Cruz Aguayo, Sergio Pérez Molina, Jorge Fuentes (nickname Trotsko), Edgardo Condeza, Juan Saavedra Gorriategy, Máximo Jara, and Horacio Vergara Mehrson. All of whom, together with old-timers Marcello Ferrada de Noli, Bautista Van Schowen Vasey, Jorge Gutiérrez Correa, and his brothers Edgardo and Marco A., formed Miguel Enríquez first VRM-group in Concepción, the embryo of MIR.

The foundation of MIR took place in August 1965, in a constituent assembly held at the Chilean Anarchist's facilities in Santiago and in which less than a hundred persons participated, mainly from Concepción and Santiago. Here Luciano Cruz participated also for the first time together with Enríquez as militants of the same political organization. The document "La conquista del poder por la vía insureccional" ("the conquest of power through insurrection") with the first political-military theses of MIR and which was elaborated by Miguel Enríquez ("Viriatto"), his brother Marco Antonio ("Bravo") and Marcello Ferrada de Noli ("Atacama") was approved by the foundation congress. Miguel was then elected a member of the new organization's Central Committee, however he became officially MIR's chairman only in 1967. In this post as political leader MIR Miguel Enríquez remained until his death, when he was murdered by Pinochet's forces in October 1974.

== Criticism of the Popular Unity government ==
Under his leadership the MIR provided only critical support to the Unidad Popular (UP) (Popular Unity) government headed by Salvador Allende between 1970 and 1973. Highly critical of the reformist role being played by the Communist Party of Chile in the Popular Unity government, the MIR became the object of considerable criticism and attacks by both the left and right of the political establishment. The MIR vehemently attacked the reluctance of the Popular Unity government to openly utilize force to seize private property and establish a socialist regime.

As the U.P. coalition headed by Salvador Allende leaned more to a gradual transition to socialism, abiding by the Laws and current Constitution and trusting that the "neutral political tradition" of the Chilean armed forces would avoid a military intervention, the MIR called for an armed revolution. The MIR, organized, recruited and trained people in para-military camps, preparing them to lead the revolution.

Miguel Enriquez's plans for a revolution were interrupted by the September 11 Military Coup.

== September 11, 1973 Military Coup ==
After the September 11, 1973 coup Miguel Enríquez and other members of the MIR refused to accept political asylum in foreign embassies and rejected a condition of exile outside their country – considering the act of fleeing for personal security a form of betrayal to their socialist cause. Instead, they insisted on leading their communist revolution.

One of the first and major undertakings of Army Intelligence DINA was to exterminate by all means the leadership of the MIR. The MIR became of particular concern to Dictator Pinochet because it had had no formal organization framework and relied on cells; much of its activities were unpredictable and irregular in nature; they had also managed to infiltrate the Chilean Armed Forces. The MIR became the object of Pinochet's paranoia and pretext for violating human rights by illegally detaining, torturing, and/or killing innocent people. As a result, between 1973 and 1976 most of its young leaders like Miguel Enriquez and Bautista van Schouwen Vasey were killed. The Rettig report (Report of the Chilean National Commission on Truth and Reconciliation) emphasized the repression against the MIR.

After the coup d'état by the armed forces against Allende's government on Tuesday 11 September 1973, Miguel was one of the main guerrilla leaders that remained after many fled the country. This proved to be a precarious existence and Miguel was assassinated by agents of the Dirección de Inteligencia Nacional (DINA) (National Intelligence Directorate) in the slum home where he was carrying out his clandestine operations. He is buried in the Cementerio General de Chile in Santiago and the medicine faculty of the Superior Institute of Medicine of La Habana, Cuba, has been named in his honor.

== See also ==
- Criticisms of Salvador Allende
- Andrés Pascal Allende
- History of Chile

== Sources ==
- Chilean Library of Congress biography (in Spanish)
- Family information from official site (in Spanish)
- Memories of her arrest at Cuatro Álamos (in Spanish)
