= Progressive Party (Chile) =

Defunct political party in Chile (2010–2022)

Progressive Party Partido Progresista
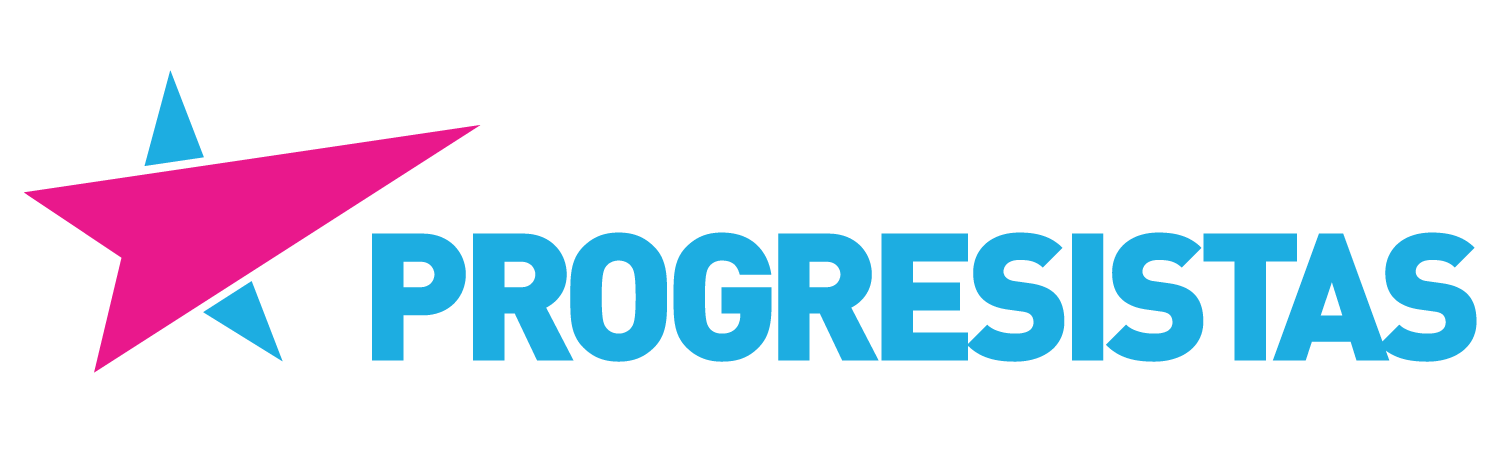
- Abbreviation: PRO
- Leader: Marco Enriquez-Ominami
- President: Camilo Lagos
- Founder: Marco Enriquez-Ominami
- Founded: 10 May 2010
- Legalised: 15 April 2011
- Dissolved: 3 February 2022
- Split from: Socialist Party
- Succeeded by: Progressive Homeland
- Youth wing: Progressive Youth (JPRO)
- Ideology: Democratic socialism Progressivism; Environmentalism; Feminism; Left-wing populism
- Political position: Left-wing
- National affiliation: Formerly: Constituent Unity (2020-2021); Unity for Change (2019-2020)
- Colours: Red and Blue

Website
- http://www.losprogresistas.cl/

The Progressive Party (Spanish: Partido Progresista, PRO) was a political party in Chile. It was founded in 2010 by former Socialist deputy and presidential candidate Marco Enriquez-Ominami. It is the political successor of the coalition New Majority for Chile.

The political party was composed of Enriquez-Ominami supporters in the presidential campaign of 2009, former members of the Concertación, and other leftist political movements. After a process of collecting signatures, it was enrolled in some regions.

The party saw minimal success, only winning a maximum of two seats in the Chamber of Deputies.

It lost registration after failing to gain at least 5% of the popular vote in the 2021 parliamentary elections.

The following is a list of the presidential candidates supported by the Progressive Party. (Information gathered from the Archive of Chilean Elections).

- 2013: Marco Enríquez-Ominami (lost)
- 2017: Marco Enríquez-Ominami (lost)
- 2021: Marco Enríquez-Ominami (lost)
