= Camu (name) =

Camu may refer to the following people:

- Camu Tao (Tero Smith, 1977–2008), American rapper and producer
- Arnoldo Camu (died 1973), Chilean lawyer and political activist
- Pierre Camu (1923–2023), Canadian geographer, civil servant, academic, and transport executive
- Renée Camu (born 1936), French rower
