= Progressive Homeland =

Progressive Homeland Patria Progresista
- Abbreviation: PP
- Leader: Marco Enríquez-Ominami
- President: Ignacio Bustos Sáez
- General Secretary: Filomena Urbina Campos
- Founded: 21 October 2022
- Registered: 29 August 2023
- Dissolved: 12 April 2024
- Preceded by: Progressive Party
- Headquarters: Marcoleta 44, depto. 1315, Santiago
- Ideology: Progressivism; Plurinationalism; Feminism
- Political position: Centre-left to left-wing
- Colours: Blue; Magenta
- Chamber of Deputies: 0 / 155
- Senate: 0 / 43

Website
- www.progresistas.cl

The Progressive Homeland (Spanish: Patria Progresista; PP) was a Chilean political party founded in October 2022. It is considered the successor of the Progressive Party (PRO), a formation led by former congressman and former presidential candidate Marco Enríquez-Ominami. Its registration was accepted by the Electoral Service of Chile (Servel) in August 2023.

== History ==
The Progressive Party (PRO) was created in 2010 around the figure of Enríquez-Ominami, former deputy of the Socialist Party (PS) and presidential candidate in the 2009 election. The party supported the Enríquez-Ominami's subsequent presidential nominations (2013, 2017 and 2021). In January 2022, the Electoral Service declared its dissolution because it did not elect deputies or reach the minimum threshold of votes required by law in the 2021 parliamentary elections.

At the beginning of 2023, the creation of a new party called Progressive Homeland was announced. The party, which used the same website and social networks as the PRO, began its registration procedures under the presidency of Ignacio Bustos, a leader close to Marco Enríquez-Ominami. In August of that same year, the Servel reported that Progressive Homeland had managed to establish itself in the regions of O'Higgins, Maule and Ñuble.

On 12 April 2024, the Chilean Electoral Service issued a resolution in which it reported the dissolution of the party after rejecting the communication of the constitution of its party bodies in the regions where it was established.
