= Edgardo Enríquez =

Chilean academic and politician (1912-1996)

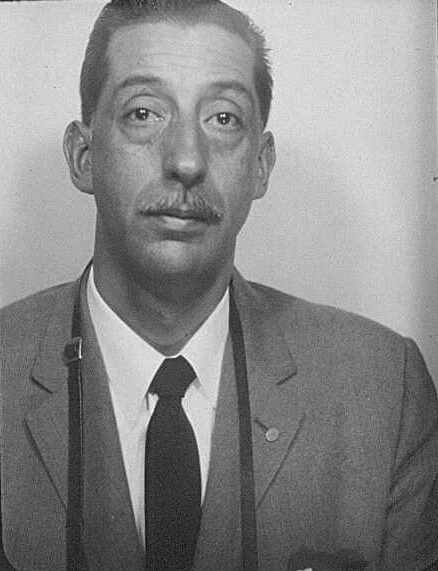
- Enríquez in April 1956.

Ministry of Education
- In office July 5, 1973 – September 11, 1973
- President: Salvador Allende
- Preceded by: Jorge Tapias Valdés
- Succeeded by: José Navarro Tobar

Personal details
- Born: Edgardo Enríquez Frödden; February 9, 1912 Concepción, Chile
- Died: November 1, 1996 (aged 84) Santiago de Chile
- Party: Popular Unity (1969-1973)
- Relations: Marco Enríquez-Ominami (grandson)
- Children: 4, including Miguel Enríquez
- Education: University of Concepción
- Occupation: Academic; Physician; Naval officer; Politician
- Profession: Physician

Edgardo Enríquez Frödden (Spanish pronunciation: [eðˈɣaɾðo enˈrikes]; February 9, 1912 - November 1, 1996) was a Chilean physician, academic and minister of education under the Salvador Allende government.

== Biography ==
=== Family and careers ===
Enríquez Frödden was born into an upper middle class family that featured prominently in the political history of the city of Concepción, Chile, as the son of Marco Antonio Enríquez Henríquez and Rosalba Frödden Lorenzen. His sister, Inés Enríquez Frödden, (1913–1998) was a lawyer, a leader of the Chilean Radical Party and the first woman elected into the chamber of deputies of the Chilean parliament. His brother, Humberto Enríquez Frödden (1907–1989), was a law professor, Chilean senator and minister of health. Another brother, Hugo Enríquez Frödden, a physician, held the position of director of the Juan Aguirre Hospital in Santiago and was a distinguished member of the World Health Organization.

He entered the medical school of the University of Concepción in 1930 and graduated in 1936. As a student he received the A. de Ambrossy Prize from the University of Concepción and the Carlos Mockenberg Prize from the University of Chile – both awards were earned for academic excellence. He married the lawyer Raquel Espinoza Townsend with whom he had four children: his youngest child Miguel Enríquez (1944–1974) followed him into the field of medicine and became the legendary revolutionary figure who founded the MIR and headed the resistance against the Pinochet dictatorship.

Enríquez Frödden served in the Naval Academy from 1938, first as a general practitioner, later he became the director of the Naval Hospital of Talcahuano; ultimately reaching the rank of Captain of the Naval Medical Services Corp. He was also a professor of anatomy and medicine in a number of schools and institutions and he chaired the first Latin American Studies Conference held in Concepción in 1969.

=== Popular Unity ===
Just after the June 29, 1973 tanquetazo, Salvador Allende began to set up a new cabinet to appease his opponents in Congress who were systematically impairing his democratically elected socialist government. Allende began to offer ministerial posts to members of the Christian democratic party - a party that had traditionally represented the middle classes in Chile. By 1973 the Christian democratic party had started to shift to the right and openly show support for a military overthrow of the popular unity government. In this climate of open political provocation by his enemies in Congress Allende found it difficult to find someone with the credentials to accept the ministerial portfolio for education because the education reforms he had initiated encountered major obstacles. Allende had promised an overhaul in education in Chile, he massively increased expenditure for public education and had implemented a university reform aimed to facilitate access to higher education for the working class and people from the shanty towns. His reform had started to encounter powerful and staunch opposition from private educational institutions (which was backed by the Roman Catholic Church hierarchy and employers' organisations) – where the Chilean elite normally enrolled their children to prevent them associating with lower or working-class people.

It was within this political context that Enríquez Frödden accepted the post of minister of education offered to him by Allende - but his ministerial term was cut short by the U.S. backed military overthrow of the Salvador Allende government on September 11, 1973.

=== Arrest and exile ===
After the military overthrow of the Popular Unity government and the subsequent death of President Salvador Allende, the new military junta declared members of his government enemies of the state. The military junta moved quickly to remove Allende's ministers from the public scene with many imprisoned, exiled and some murdered. Enriquez Frödden was arrested, imprisoned and then relocated to the remote concentration camp set up in Dawson Island. He was forced into exile with his wife in 1976 and settled in Mexico where he remained for about 14 years. Enriquez Frödden (with his wife Raquel) spent the rest of their lives campaigning for the disappeared and denouncing the human rights abuses that were committed by the Pinochet regime. Two of his sons Miguel Enríquez, and Edgardo Enriquez along with his ex-son in law Bautista van Schouwen (all three leading members of the MIR) were assassinated in the first period of the Pinochet dictatorship.

…the old Chilean Army. Its members were like a family. We all knew and respected each other. It was with great pain that I witnessed such a radical and unfavourable change in it after September 1973. The army had been corrupted by officers and sub-officers who had completed courses in Internal War and National Security in the United States (WHISC). Most of the graduates of these courses returned to Chile transformed into Nazis. I never could have imagined a naval officer taking on the role of jailer and torturer. To my disgrace I not only bore witness to this but experience it first hand since I suffered both physical and psychological torture in their hands – such as being given water with faeces to drink in a concentration camp in Dawson Island, which was administered and directed by the Chilean Armed Forces.

— Dr. Edgardo Enríquez Frödden (1994)

== Positions held ==
- President of the Regional Council of Concepcion of Chile's School of Medicine between 1949 and 1967.
- Director of the Naval Hospital of Talcahuano. (1963–1969)
- Professor of Anatomy at the University of Concepción and the University of Chile (1936–1972)
- Rector of the University of Concepción. (1969–1972)
- Minister of Education (July 1973 – September 1973)

== Bibliography ==
- Gilbert, Jorge. Edgardo Enríquez Frödden testimonio de un destierro (1992) ISBN 956-265-043-X

== See also ==
- Miguel Enríquez

Academic offices
Preceded by David Stitchkin Branover	Rector of the University of Concepción; 1969–1972	Succeeded by Carlos Von Plessing Baentsch
Political offices
Preceded by Jorge Tapia Valdés	Minister of Education; July 5, 1973 - September 11, 1973	Succeeded by José Navarro Tobar
