= The Indicter =

Swedish magazine

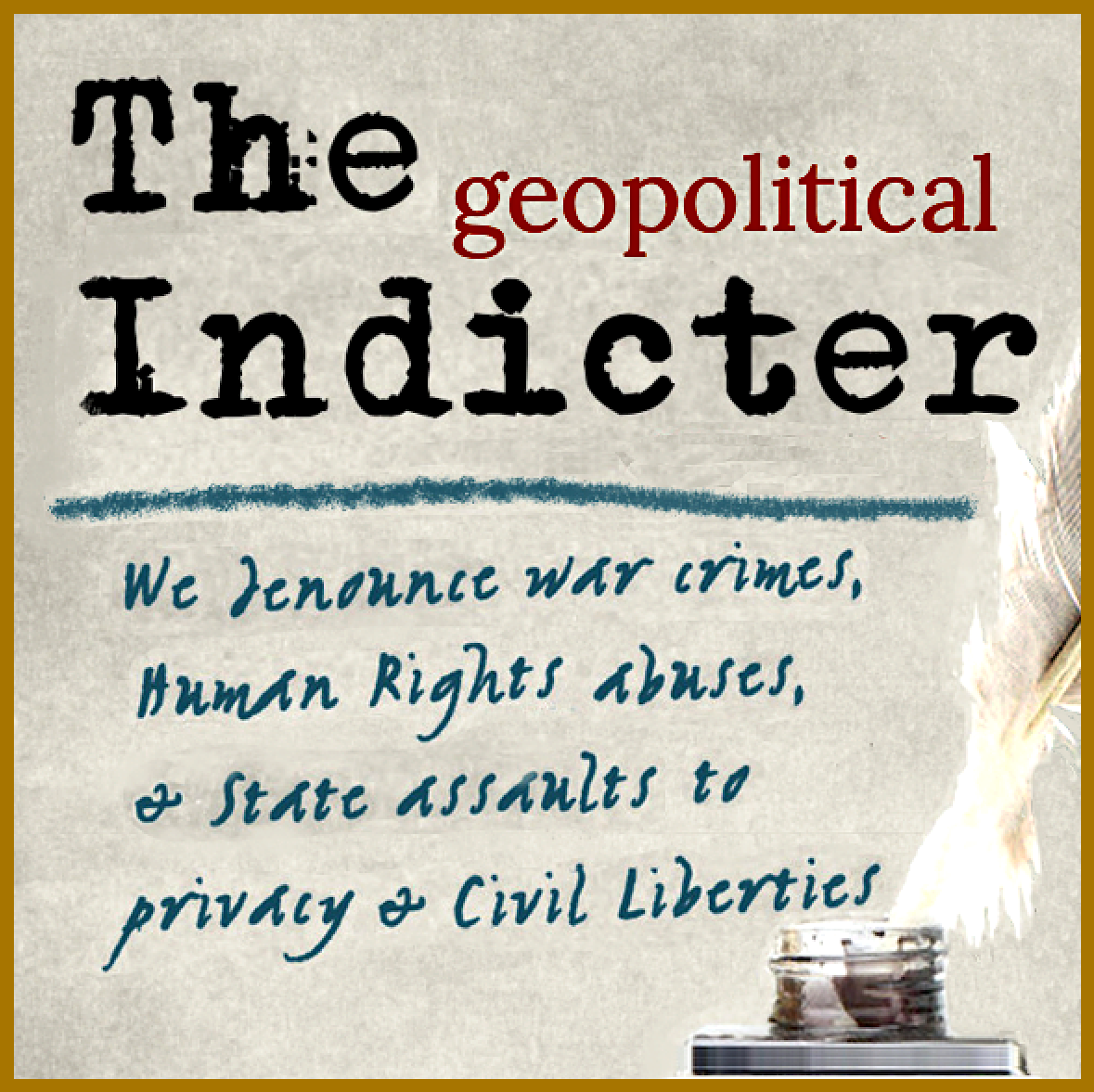
Old The Indicter logo

The Indicter (ISSN 3119-2610), established in Sweden 2015, is an independent, open-access scholarly journal published in English. It focuses on critical analysis of political epidemiology, political philosophy, geopolitics and human rights issues. Its Mission statement reads:

"The journal is committed to evidence-based inquiry, humanist values, and scientific rigour. Published monthly, The Indicter has maintained a commitment to open access, intellectual independence, and critical scholarly engagement with issues of political power, human rights, and global injustice."

Material published by The Indicter has been the subject of international controversy; in 2017 it published an analysis which became an official document at the UN Security Council.

The Swedish newspaper Dagens Nyheter describes The Indicter as a publication associated with the NGO Swedish Doctors for Human Rights (SWEDHR). However, Sources notes that the monthly magazine's legal publisher is the Swedish company Libertarian Books Europe.

Numerous articles published by The Indicter and its predecessor, the Professor's Blog, were reproduced through WikiLeaks' social media between 2010 and 2018. However, some of the magazine's analyses have been critically addressed in a number of European mainstream media outlets including Der Spiegel, Le Figaro, France 24, Liberation, and HuffPost, in addition to Swedish news sites.

The journal reached half a million viewers in December 2020, according to Jetpack stats reproduced in the journal (statistics starting April 2016). The Indicter was founded by Marcello Ferrada de Noli, a social libertarian professor.

== Controversies ==
In 2017 The Indicter published a series of articles challenging the forensic medical evidence about an alleged gas attack in Sarmin, 2015, that had been presented at the United Nations by Syrian doctors who opposed the Assad government. After the Syrian ambassador to the UN, Bashar Jaafari, referred to The Indicter's report at a Security Council session on April 12, 2017, the magazine became a target of criticism by several Western mainstream media outlets, including the Swedish outlets Dagens Nyheter and Expressen. Swedish media also attacked The Indicter for being mentioned by the Director of the Information and Press Department of the Ministry of Foreign Affairs of the Russian Federation, Maria Zakharova, in a press conference aired 16 March 2017. Maria Zakharova also posted a tweet with an image reproducing The Indicter logo. According to Dagens Nyheter, the Russian envoy to the Organisation for the Prohibition of Chemical Weapons, Mikhail Uljanov, used a report published in The Indicter April 2017 to question claims by the Syrian opposition regarding the Syrian government's responsibility for the Khan Sheikhoun gas attack.

Some of the findings of the above-mentioned investigation published in The Indicter were challenged by Coda Media's site, Coda Story. The Indicter validated these anew and extended an invitation to Coda Story to publicly debate the issue. Coda Story failed to reply.

Swedish media reported that Marcello Ferrada de Noli, publishing his findings in The Indicter, had analysed the OPCW report following the claim of a chemical weapons attack in Syria. After request by the Russian ambassador to the UN, Vasily Nebenzya, the UN Secretary General approved the inclusion of The Indicter article as official document of the Security Council in February 2018.
