= Public image of Salvador Allende =

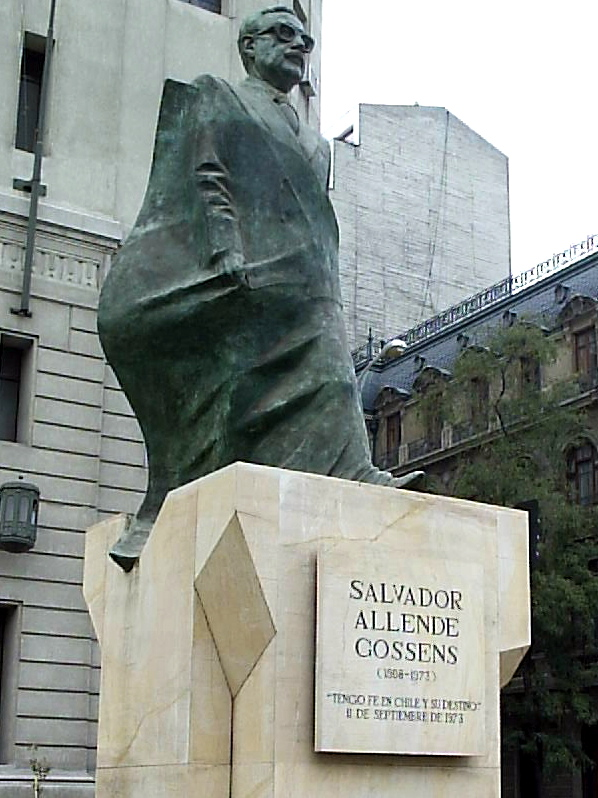
Statue of Allende in Constitución Square, in front of La Moneda Palace

Salvador Allende was involved in Chilean politics for over forty years. He has been lauded as a hero, but also criticized from the right and the left. Despite efforts by the Christian-Democratic-led governments of the post-Pinochet era to diminish his reputation, Salvador Allende remains an important historical figure in Chile. The social-democratic President Ricardo Lagos has honored Allende as a humanist and a statesman.

== Supporters' view ==
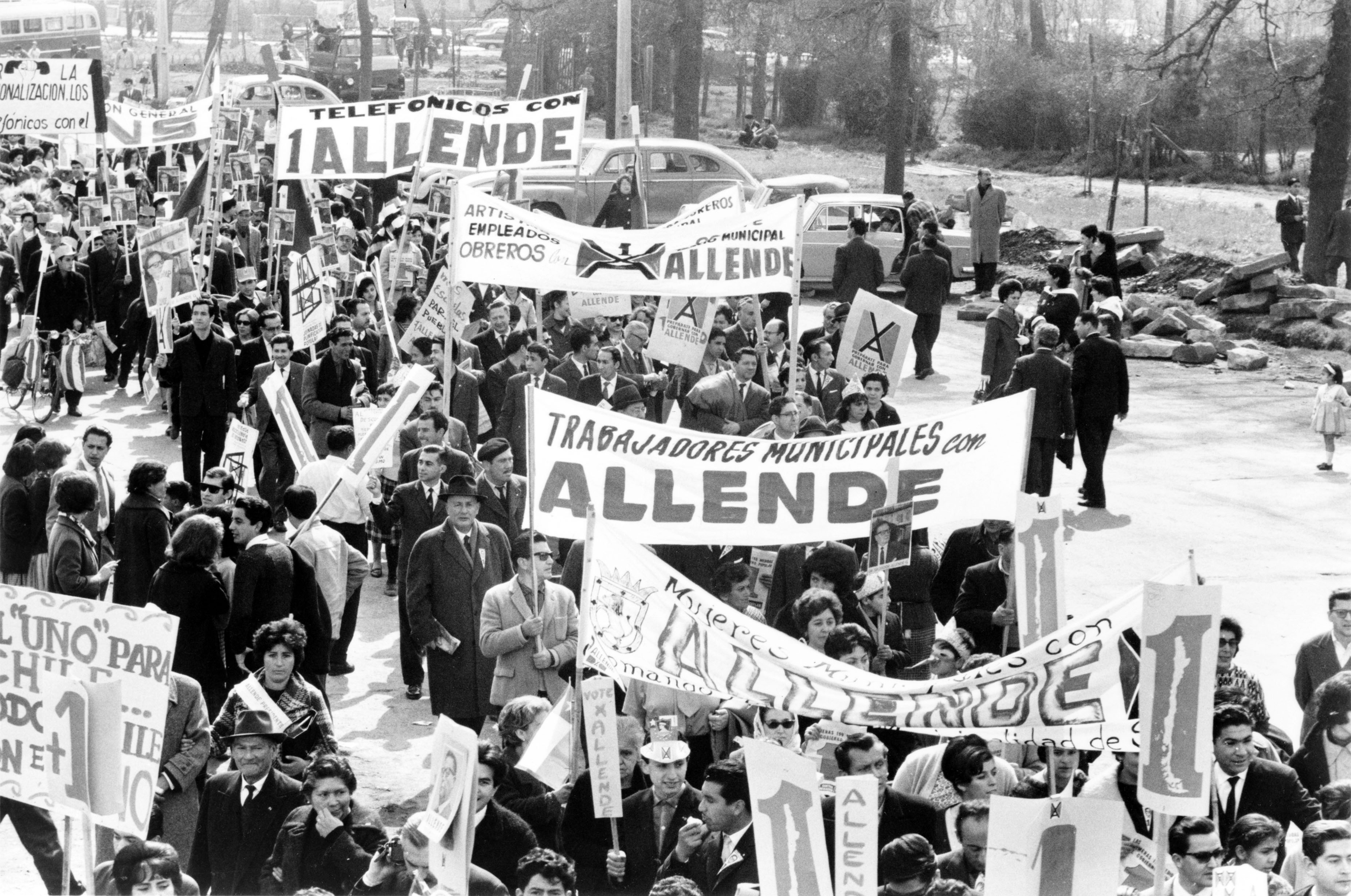
Chileans marching in support of Allende

His supporters argue that he did not win an outright majority because Christian Democrat Radomiro Tomić, running on a leftist platform similar to Allende's, split the Centrist vote. Tomic and Allende together gathered 64% of the vote, a clear majority. His opponents maintain that Allende went much farther to the left than the Centrist voters who supported Tomic could have expected. The Christian Democratic Party was supportive of a military intervention to remove Allende from office but began to disassociate itself from the 1973 coup d'état because of the violently repressive nature of the Pinochet regime.

Allende is seen as a hero to many on the political Left. Some view him as a martyr who died for the cause of socialism. His face has even been stylized and reproduced as a symbol of Marxism, similar to the famous images of Che Guevara. Many view him as a victim of American imperialism. For his supporters, his greatest legacy was his conviction that socialism can be reached through a liberal democratic and pacifist path. His legacy can be seen in the election of governments professing socialism in Venezuela and Bolivia.

== Opponents' views ==
Allende has been criticized for his government's mass nationalization of private industry, alleged friendliness with more militant groups such as the Movement of the Revolutionary Left, and the supply shortages and hyperinflation that occurred during the latter years of his presidency; all these had combined to cause a strong polarization in the country and the committed opposition of the Christian Democratic Party at the time of the coup. He is also accused of having had an autocratic style, attempting to circumvent the Congress and the courts, and having a hostile attitude toward critical media.

A common claim among opponents was the belief that Allende's friendship with Fidel Castro and closeness with Eastern bloc countries meant that he was planning to model the Chilean state along Cuban lines. Such allegations are highly controversial. One of the military junta's statements accused him of formulating the supposed "Plan Z", in which the Popular Unity government was accused to have planned a bloody coup of its own to install Allende as dictator. The junta alleged that the plot was to be no less than a blueprint for assassinations of military leaders and general "mass murder". The CIA later concluded, on September 18, 2000 that "Plan Z" was probably disinformation. Nevertheless, according to his opponents, Allende's own refusal to obey and/or enforce more than 7,000 Chilean Supreme Court and other legislative rulings (as detailed in the Resolution of August 22, 1973) was a sign of dictatorial style in defiance of Chile's democratic government institutions.

=== Marxist criticism and assessment ===
Shortly after the military coup one of the most prominent opponent of Salvador Allende’s reformist policies, the young physician and MIR leader Miguel Enriquez stated:

"The reformist project put in place by the UP enclosed itself within the bourgeois order...it aimed to forge an alliance with sectors of the bourgeoisie, it didn’t lean on the revolutionary organizations of the working class, in its own organs of popular power, it rejected an alliance with rank and file soldiers and sub officers in the armed forces, it sought to seal an alliance with the bourgeois faction. The reformist illusions allowed the ruling classes to prevail in the superstructure of the state from where it initiated its reactionary counter offensive, by, firstly, leaning on industrialist federations, on the petty-bourgeoisie and finally on high-ranking officials of the Chilean Armed Forces...."

Conversely, Albanian leader Enver Hoxha argued that the overthrow of the Allende Government was due in part to the "revisionist" reformism encouraged by the post-Joseph Stalin Soviet Union:

"History has proved, and the events in Chile, where it was not yet a question of socialism but of a democratic regime, again made clear, that the establishment of socialism through the parliamentary road is utterly impossible. In the first place, it must be said that up till now it has never happened that the bourgeoisie has allowed the communists to win a majority in parliament and form their own government. Even in the occasional instance where the communists and their allies have managed to ensure a balance in their favour in parliament and enter the government; this has not led to any change in the bourgeois character of the parliament or the government, and their action has never gone so far as to smash the old state machine and establish a new one.... The Khrushchevite revisionists have deliberately created great confusion concerning Lenin’s very clear and precise theses on the participation of communists in the bourgeois parliament and on the seizure of state power from the bourgeoisie. It is known that Lenin did not deny the participation of the communists in the bourgeois parliament at certain moments. But he considered this participation only as at tribune to defend the interests of the working class, to expose the bourgeoisie and its state power, to force the bourgeoisie to take some measure in favour of the working people. At the same time, however, Lenin warned that, while fighting to make use of parliament in the interests of the working class, one should guard against the creation of parliamentary illusions, the fraud of bourgeois parliamentarianism."

== Victor Farías' accusations ==
In his book, Salvador Allende: Anti-Semitism and Euthanasia, Victor Farías, a Chilean-born historian at the Latin America Institute of the Free University of Berlin, claims that Allende inferred that mental illnesses, criminal behavior, and alcoholism were hereditary. Likewise, Farías states that Allende proclaimed that the hot climate prevented people in southern regions from acting morally.

=== Antisemitic and racism accusation ===
Eugenics and racism were part of the mainstream at European and American universities long before the Nazis rose to power. In the United States, scientists of the early 20th century initiated full-fledged breeding projects tolerated by the government. As a result, about 60,000 Americans – in most cases epileptics, alcoholics, and people with alleged social disorders – had to undergo forced sterilization, even in the 1970s.

Farías' allegations were questioned by the Spanish President Allende Foundation, which published various relevant materials on the internet, including the dissertation itself and a letter of protest sent by the Chilean Congress (and signed among others by Allende) to Adolf Hitler after Kristallnacht. The Foundation claims that in his thesis Allende was quoting Italian-Jewish scientist Cesare Lombroso, whereas he himself was critical of these theories. Farías maintains the affirmations that appear in his book. The President Allende Foundation replied publishing the entire original text of Lombroso and in April 2006 filed an anti-libel claim against Farías and his publisher in the Court of Justice of Madrid (Spain).

Chile's leading daily, the conservative El Mercurio, published a defense of Allende by summarizing that Farías omits the historical context.

Farías paraphrases of Lombroso have been much quoted; for example The Daily Telegraph (UK) reported 12 May 2005 that "Allende... wrote: 'The Hebrews are characterised by certain types of crime: fraud, deceit, slander and above all usury. These facts permits the supposition that race plays a role in crime.' Among the Arabs, he wrote, were some industrious tribes but 'most are adventurers, thoughtless and lazy with a tendency to theft'

The Telegraph's quotation about the Jews appears to be a combination of two sentences that are not adjacent in the dissertation. Both are part of Allende's summary of Cesare Lombroso's views on different "tribes", "races" and "nations" being prone to different types of crime; the latter is misquoted. Allende's passage about the Jews reads "The Hebrews are characterized by certain types of crime: fraud, deceit, defamation and, above all, usury. On the other hand, murders and crimes of passion are the exception." After recounting Lombroso's views, Allende writes, "These data lead one to suspect that race influences crime. Nonetheless, we lack precise data to demonstrate this influence in the civilized world." The passage about Arabs is "Among the Arabs there are some honored and hardworking tribes, and others who are adventurers, thoughtless and lazy with a tendency to theft." There is no statement that the latter applies to "most" Arabs.

Farías further claims to have found evidence that Allende had tried to implement his ideas about heredity during his period as Health Minister 1939-1941, and that he received help from German Nazis E. Brücher and Hans Betzhold in drafting of an unsuccessful bill mandating forced sterilisation of alcoholics. The President Allende Foundation has challenged Farias in the Court of Justice of Madrid (Spain) to prove that any bill on this issue has been proposed by Minister Allende to the Chilean Government or Parliament, and to prove as well Farías' allegation that Allende was bribed by the Nazi foreign minister Joachim von Ribbentrop without providing any evidence of it.

Surviving personal friends of Allende have completely rejected the validity of Victor Farías accusations of "racism" and "anti-semitism" for two major reasons: Allende's mother, Laura Gossens Uribe, was of Jewish descent and Allende considered himself a Marxist and socialist internationalist for most of his adult life.

During his term in office, Allende - who was himself an atheist - supported a more ecumenical approach to national festivities and encouraged participation from the small Chilean Jewish community in celebrating Chile’s Independence Day, which had always been sanctified by the Roman Catholic Church. During his term in office, the Great Rabbi of Santiago, spiritual leader of the Jewish Community, had a principal role in the preparation of an ecumenical service for this event.

Further countering accusations of anti-semitism is the fact that Allende entrusted two of the most important tasks of his government to Chilean Jews: Jacques Chonchol to direct and implemented the successful agrarian reform which completely transformed the country’s agricultural structure, and David Silberman Gurovich, who was in charge of consolidating the nationalization of the most important industry in the country, Codelco-Chuquicamata (the largest open-pit copper mine in the World).

=== Nazi criminal extradition ===
In the book, Victor Farías writes about the revelation of Allende's refusal to turn Nazi criminal Walter Rauff over to Germany in 1972. Even attempts by the Nazi hunter Simon Wiesenthal to intervene with the president failed at the time.

Allende argued that the president is not allowed to get involved in judicial matters as Chile's Supreme Court had previously ruled that Rauff could not be handed over because the limitations on his case had expired.
