= Santiago General Cemetery =

Cemetery in Chile

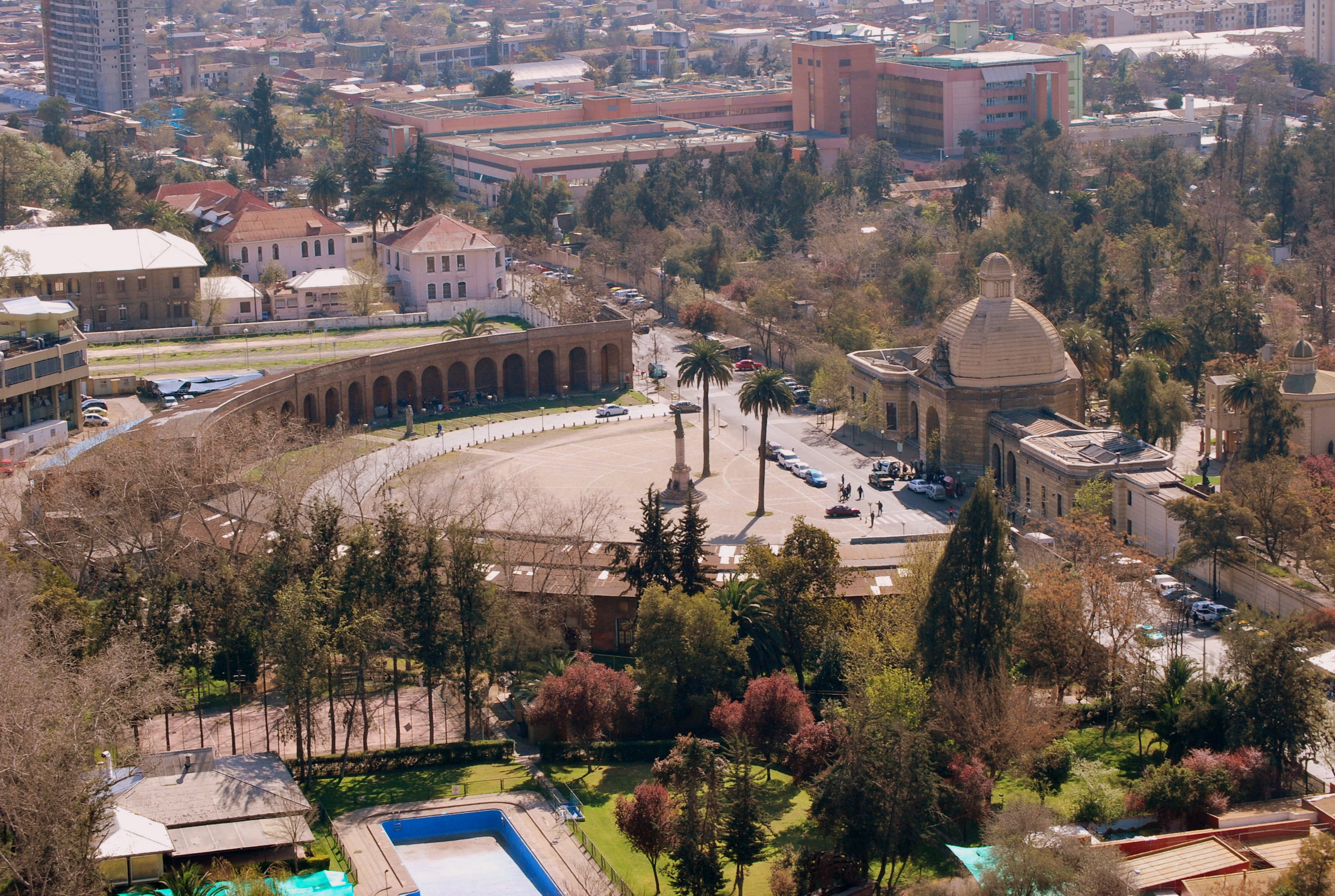
- Entrance
- Interactive map of Santiago General Cemetery

Details
- Established: 9 December 1820
- Location: Commune of Recoleta, Santiago
- Country: Chile
- Coordinates: 33°24′46″S 70°38′57″W
- Size: 85 hectares (210 acres)
- No. of interments: ~ 2 million

The Santiago General Cemetery (Spanish: Cementerio General de Santiago) in Santiago, Chile, is one of the largest cemeteries in Latin America with an estimated two million burials. The cemetery was established in 1821 after Chile's independence when Bernardo O'Higgins inaugurated the Alameda de las Delicias along the old course of the Mapocho River. O'Higgins set aside more than 85 hectares of land for the foundation of what became a magnificent grounds filled with ornate mausoleums surrounded by palm and leaf trees set amidst lush gardens and numerous sculptures, which have been estimated be 237. The cemetery, which is located northwest of Cerro Blanco, serves as a true urban park for Santiago located in the municipality of Recoleta.

This cemetery is the final resting place for at least 172 of the most influential people in Chile, including all but three of the deceased Presidents of Chile, the exceptions being Gabriel González Videla, Augusto Pinochet and Sebastián Piñera. In 1854, the Dissidents’ Courtyard was established within the cemetery to provide a dedicated burial area for non-Catholics. One of the most visited memorials is that of former President Salvador Allende who had been buried in the Santa Ines cemetery at Viña del Mar following his suicide in the 1973 coup d'état. With the democratic changes that began in the 1990s, Allende was exhumed and his remains were transported in a solemn procession through the streets of Santiago to a place of honor in the Cementerio General de Santiago. The cemetery also has a memorial to the people that were 'disappeared' during the dictatorship of Augusto Pinochet that ousted President Allende.

The gatehouse that serves as the main entrance to the cemetery is crowned by a dome, which acts as a terminating vista for La Paz Avenue. This entrance is preceded by the Plaza La Paz, a semicircular plaza whose curved portion is framed by two exposed brick arcades. At the center of the square stands a monument dedicated to the people who died in the Church of the Company Fire. The cemetery can be accessed via Cementerios metro station.

The historical portion of the cemetery was designated as a national monument in 2010, reaching the same status as Patio 29.

== Notable interments ==
- Salvador Allende (1908–1973), President of Chile
- Arturo Alessandri (1868–1950), President of Chile
- Jorge Alessandri (1896–1986), President of Chile
- Eduardo Frei Montalva (1911–1982), President of Chile
- Patricio Aylwin (1918–2016), President of Chile
- Pedro Aguirre Cerda (1879–1941), President of Chile
- José Manuel Balmaceda (1840–1891), President of Chile
- Eduardo Alquinta (1945–2003), Musician, leader of the Chilean band Los Jaivas
- Jaime Guzmán (1946–1991), Senator, founder of the Independent Democratic Union
- Luis Emilio Recabarren (1876–1924), Deputy, founder of the Communist Party of Chile
- Walter Rauff (1906–1984), SS commander and Nazi war criminal
- Víctor Jara (1932–1973), poet, folk singer
- Joan Jara (1927–2023) dancer, activist, wife of Víctor Jara
- Manuel Rodríguez Erdoíza (1785–1818), Guerrilla leader and hero of the independence
- Orlando Letelier (1932–1976), statesman
- Carlos Prats (1915–1974), general, statesman
- Violeta Parra (1917–1967), folk singer
- Miguel Enríquez Espinosa (1944–1974), General Secretary of the Revolutionary Left Movement
- Max Westenhofer (1871–1957), German scientist and professor of pathology at the University of Berlin and the University of Chile
- Irene Morales (1865-1890), Chilean soldier who served in the War of the Pacific.
- Daniel Zamudio (1987-2012), murder victim

== See also ==
- Memorial for the Disappeared
- Patio 29
