= Patio 29 =

Common grave of political prisoners in Santiago General Cemetery

Coordinates: 33.4085°S 70.6485°W

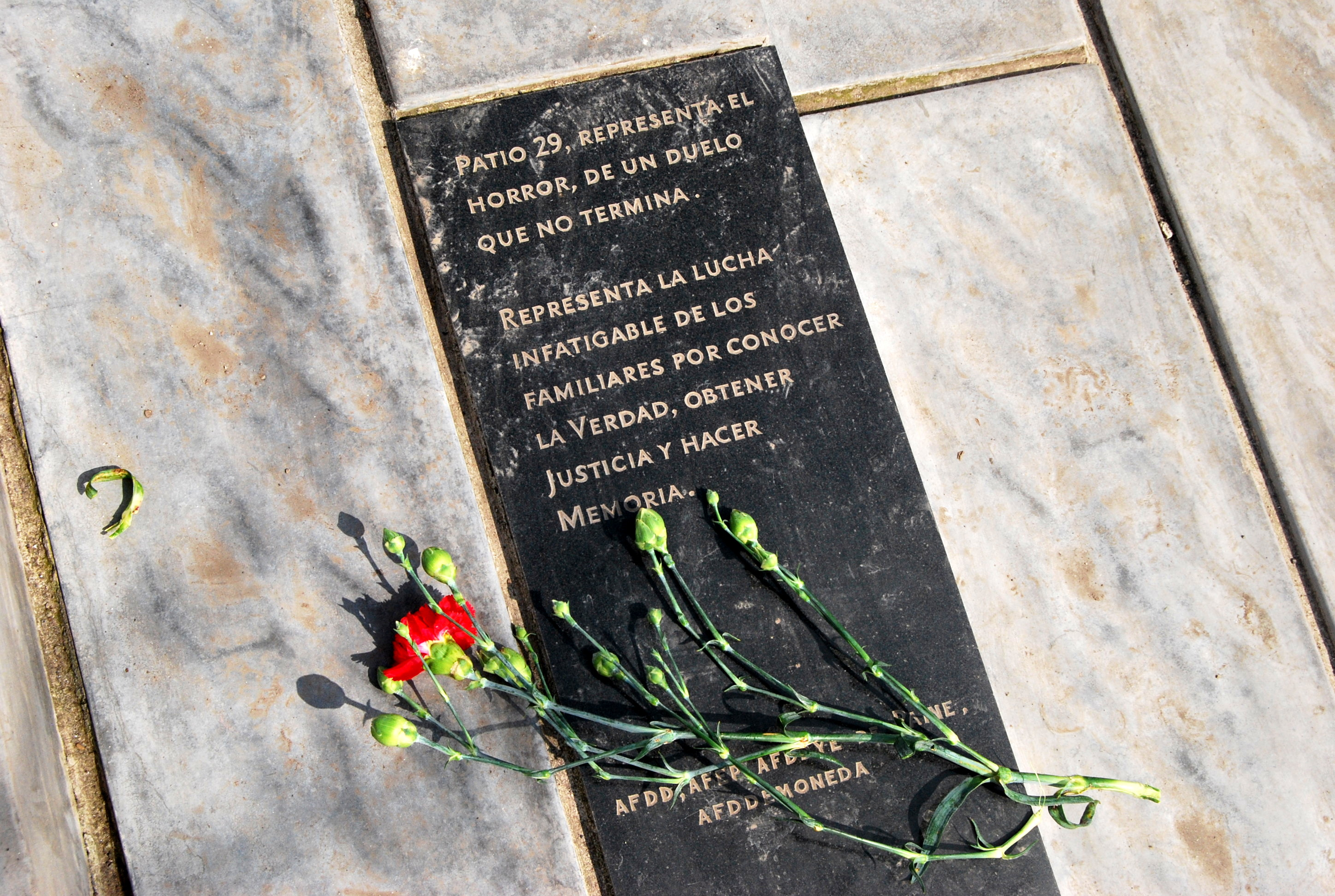
Plaque on Patio 29. Inscription reads: Patio 29 represents the horror of a mourning that does not end. It represents the tireless fight of the families to know the Truth, obtain Justice and make Memory.

Patio 29 (Spanish: Yard 29) is a common grave site in Santiago General Cemetery in Chile, where political prisoners, especially those who "disappeared" during the 1973 Chilean coup d'état, were buried anonymously. The mass grave, the largest of Augusto Pinochet's military government, was used for unannounced and unmarked burials in the 1970s until an anonymous tip alerted the public to its usage. With the return of democracy to Chile in 1990, an exhumation effort through 2006 recovered 126 bodies in 105 graves and identified three-quarters of the victims. A 2005 DNA test later reported widespread identification errors and a new identification database began in 2007. Exhumation authorities report that the site has been fully exhumed, a claim contested by which families of the victims.

The burial grounds became Chile's first cemetery to be designated a protected national monument in 2006. The site serves as a symbol for the human rights movement and the 1973 coup's disappeared. As such, Patio 29 became part of the Bachelet government's "symbolic reparation" program. Annual marches against the coup end at the site.

== History ==
In 1973 a military coup overthrew the socialist Chilean government and replaced it with a military dictatorship headed by Augusto Pinochet, the Commander-in-Chief of the Chilean Army. The military rule was characterized by systematic suppression of all political dissidence. The worst violence occurred within the first three months of the coup, with the number of suspected dissidents killed or "disappeared" reaching several thousand.

In 1979, the Vicariate of Solidarity, the Catholic Church's human rights office, received information regarding illegal burials of six victims from Paine, Chile in a section of Santiago's main cemetery, known as Patio 29; this led to a court investigation which revealed that Patio 29 had been used to anonymously bury the unmarked bodies of executed political prisoners between 1970 and 1980, especially those kidnapped during the 1973 coup.

In 1981, Santiago's military prosecutor prohibited the unmarked bodies from being incinerated or removed, though Walkowitz and Knauer wrote in Memory and the Impact of Political Transformation in Public Space that the military government dug up and hid hundreds of these bodies in 1982. Following the end of military rule and return of democracy to Chile in 1990, investigation of human rights violations became a top priority. Though a 1978 amnesty decree prevented prosecution for pre-1978 offenses, the new Aylwin government sought disclosure of the truth and recompense for the victim's families and appointed a National Commission for Truth and Reconciliation. The commission's February 1991 Rettig Report named victims disappeared shortly after the coup, executed by gunshot, and presumed to be buried in Patio 29. Patio 29 was the largest of about twelve Pinochet era mass graves identified and searched.

In September 1991, two judges on cases by the Vicariate and family of disappeared leftist leader Bautista van Schouwen issued court orders to begin research projects to exhume and identify the graves. The majority of the 105 bodies recovered in 1991 appeared to have been shot and beaten. Some were missing limbs or were bound with wire. The victims were as young as 13 years old, and some coffins contained multiple bodies. Pinochet, who remained commander-in-chief of the Chilean army during the 1991 exhumation, explained that bodies were stacked to save space ("What great economizing!"), and later apologized after public outcry. This comment embarrassed Pinochet's followers and "reactivated cultural revulsion and human rights sensibilities". In Reckoning with Pinochet, Stern wrote that the 1991 exhumation led the public to view Pinochet soldiers on trial as criminals. The Santiago Catholic Church's antemortem records were matched with autopsy records to identify and return the bodily remains to living relatives.

As of 2006, 126 bodies were found, of which 96 were identified by the Medical Legal Institute in 1998. (Note: One such victim, leftist Walter Schneuer, was identified by his fingerprints. He had disappeared in the days following the coup. Records show leftist leader Bautista van Schouwen to have been buried in Patio 29 as well.) Authorities reported that all bodies in Patio 29 had been exhumed by 2006, though some families of the victims disagreed. More than 1000 of the disappeared from this period have not been found. Skepticism about the matches' veracity emerged in 2003, and the institute's own DNA testing in 2005 revealed a project rife with mistakes and exaggerated certainty: 48 bodies were wrongly identified and 37 more were doubted. The Medical Legal Institute created a new DNA database in May 2007. Three bodies were positively identified in late 2009.

Chile's National Monuments Council declared Patio 29 a National Monument on 13 July 2006 at the request of a group of Chamber of Deputies legislators. The Council chose the site for its proof of the Pinochet military government's elaborate procedures used to conceal the disappeared's bodies and their identities. At the ceremony, Patio 29 was described as a symbol of the country's painful history and an educational place for human rights. As a national monument, the site will be conserved and maintained by government funds unless ordered otherwise by the courts. It is the first cemetery to become a national monument in Chile.

In 2008, the National Monuments Council ran an architectural contest to revitalize Patio 29, and chose a project that would create a music plaza with seven copper columns linking Víctor Jara's tomb with Patio 29. The memorial is made of 3,032 precast concrete bricks.

== Description ==
Patio 29 is a common grave site in Santiago General Cemetery where the victims of mutilation, torture, and execution under the Pinochet military government were buried. Augusto Pinochet came to power in the 1973 Chilean coup d'état, where he led the army that attacked the presidential palace and overthrew President Salvador Allende. The military junta replaced constitutional rule for 17 years, under which thousands of Chileans were detained and tortured. The Patio 29 cemetery section is bordered by Mexico Avenue to the north, O'Higgins Avenue to the east, Copihues Street to the south, and Maitenes Street to the west. Though the cemetery changed its section numbering in 1987, the section is still known as Patio 29. The section has 105 graves, though many contained more than one person. The plots remain marked by their original rusted iron cross headstones with burial dates and "NN" for "no name". Most of the dates fall within the last four months of 1973. The site has not been reused for burials. Folksinger Víctor Jara, a prominent casualty of Pinochet's 1973 coup d'état, lies in a crypt across from Patio 29.

The Memorial for the Disappeared at the cemetery's Metro entrance and Víctor Jara's tomb near Patio 29 together form a ten-minute "popular route" walk through the cemetery for tourists, as opposed to the "patrimonial route" past the graves of Chilean political leaders. A sign at the Patio 29 memorial describes the site as "an emblematic place of the human rights violations that took place between 1973 and 1990 as it was used to cover up the bodies and identities of the detained disappeared and politically executed during the military regime". The annual protests against the 11 September 1973 coup start at the then-besieged La Moneda presidential palace and conclude here in the General Cemetery.

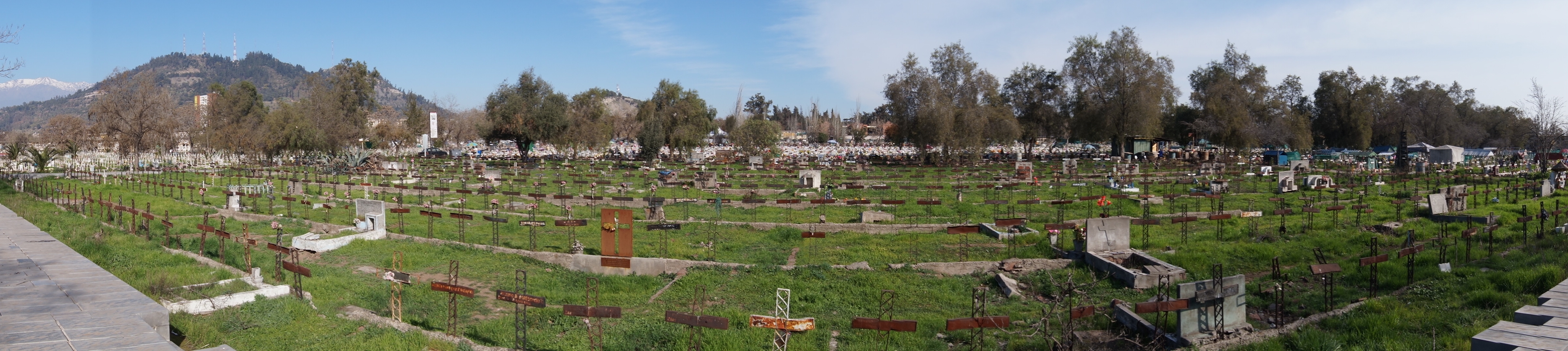
Panorama of Patio 29, August 2012

== Cultural influence ==
The exhumations at Patio 29 led to two documentaries: Patio 29: Histories of Silence, and Fernando ha vuelto, which told the story of recovering Fernando Olivares Mori's body from the plot, his burial, and an interview with his wife after the DNA-based doubts were posited. In a review of Patio 29: Tras la Cruz de Fierro, Katrien Klep placed the book alongside an international human rights trend towards "memorialization", Southern Cone writings about "monuments, memorials, and 'lugares de memoria' (memory locales)", and interest in reconciling their divided societies. In keeping with this symbolism, Patio 29 became part of the Bachelet government's "symbolic reparation" program.

== Notes and references ==
Notes

Sources

- Klep, Katrien (April 2010). "Patio 29. Tras la Cruz de Fierro by Javiera Bustamante; Stephan Ruderer; Mara Daruich". European Review of Latin American and Caribbean Studies / Revista Europea de Estudios Latinoamericanos y del Caribe (88). Centrum voor Studie en Documentatie van Latijns Amerika (CEDLA): 125–127. ISSN 0924-0608. JSTOR 25676416.
- Payne-James, Jason; Busuttil, Anthony; Smock, William S. (2003). Forensic Medicine: Clinical and Pathological Aspects. Cambridge University Press. ISBN 978-1-84110-026-5.
- Stern, Steve J. (2010). Reckoning with Pinochet: The Memory Question in Democratic Chile, 1989–2006. Duke University Press. ISBN 978-0-8223-9177-7.
- Walkowitz, Daniel J.; Knauer, Lisa Maya (2004). Memory and the Impact of Political Transformation in Public Space. Duke University Press. ISBN 978-0-8223-8634-6.
