= Marco Enríquez-Ominami =

Chilean filmmaker and politician

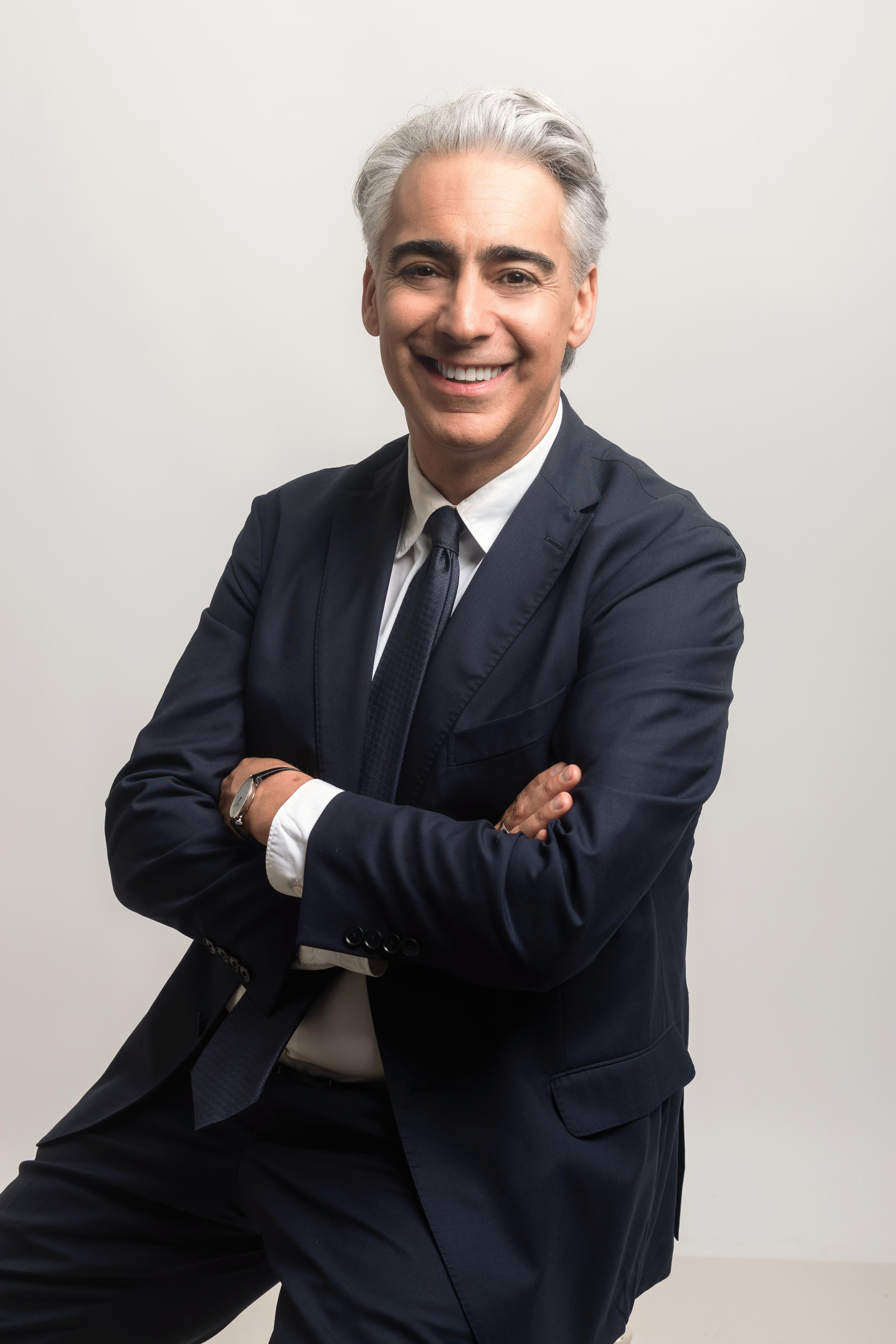
- Marco Enríquez-Ominami in 2025

Member of the Chamber of Deputies
- In office 11 March 2006 – 11 March 2010
- Constituency: 10th District

Personal details
- Born: Marco Antonio Enríquez Gumucio; 12 June 1973 (age 53) Santiago, Chile
- Citizenship: Chile
- Party: Progressive Homeland (2023–2024); Progressive Party (2010–2022); Socialist Party (1990–2009)
- Spouse: Karen Doggenweiler
- Relations: Miguel Enríquez (father); Manuela Gumucio (mother); Carlos Ominami (adoptive father)
- Children: Manuela Enríquez-Ominami Doggenweiler
- Education: University of Chile
- Occupation: Philosopher, politician and filmmaker
- Known for: Candidate for President of Chile (2009, 2013 and 2021)
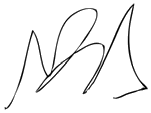
- Signature
- Website: Official website

Marco Antonio Enríquez-Ominami Gumucio (born 12 June 1973) is a Chilean-French filmmaker and politician. From 2006 to 2010 he was a Socialist Party deputy in Chile's lower chamber. In 2009 he quit the party and ran for President of the Republic as independent, where he finished third with 20% of the vote. He is currently the leader of the Progressive Party, which he founded in 2010.

Enríquez-Ominami is the son of Revolutionary Left Movement's historical leader Miguel Enríquez and sociologist Manuela Gumucio. His adoptive father is former senator Carlos Ominami. Enríquez-Ominami is married to the Chilean TV hostess Karen Doggenweiler, and has two children. Because of his long name he is frequently called MEO or ME-O both in writing and in speech.

== Early life ==
Enríquez-Ominami was born in Santiago, Chile to Miguel Enríquez Espinosa, the founder and secretary general of the Revolutionary Left Movement (MIR), and Manuela Gumucio Rivas, daughter of Rafael Agustín Gumucio Vives, a former senator and founder of the Falange Nacional political party. He is of Spanish, German, and Scottish descent by his father's side, also Bolivian and Basque from his mother's side.

His mother began a relationship with the politician Carlos Ominami in 1975; the family later returned to Chile together, and Enríquez-Ominami, who had been adopted by Ominami, added his surname to his own. He is the grandson of Edgardo Enríquez Frödden on his father's side and of Rafael Agustín Gumucio on his mother's side, and a cousin of the writer Rafael Gumucio.

In November 1973, two months after the military coup d'état which ousted the government of President Salvador Allende Enríquez-Ominami and his family were expelled from the country via a military decree, and barred from entering the country for the next ten years. His father, who stayed in the country to organize and lead an underground résistance against the Augusto Pinochet dictatorship, was assassinated in October 1974 by DINA agents who uncovered his secret location in Santiago.

Enríquez-Ominami and his family found refuge in France, where he grew up speaking French as his first language. He completed his primary education at Lycée Victor Hugo in Paris between 1981 and 1986. He then finished his secondary education at Colegio Alianza Francesa and Saint George's College in Santiago.

== Film and television career ==
He entered the Faculty of Philosophy and Humanities of the University of Chile, where he first studied literature and then philosophy, earning a bachelor's degree in philosophy (1991–1996). He was vice president of the philosophy student centre, and in 1993 he ran in the internal election for president of the University of Chile Student Federation (FECh) as the Socialist candidate, losing to Freddy Ponce, a fellow candidate on his list.

From 1998 Enríquez-Ominami began working as executive director of Rivas y Rivas producing company. In 2002 after producing and directing several shorts, feature films, reports, television ads and television films, he directed the political documentary Chile, los héroes están fatigados ("Chile, the heroes are exhausted"), which was selected to open the 16th FIPA film festival in Biarritz. The documentary was awarded at film festivals in Serbia and Montenegro and San Diego, California. In 2005 Enríquez-Ominami created and presided the ChileMedios Foundation, through which he developed several studies on local television audience behavior. In 2008, he directed the comedy film Mansacue produced by his production company and which was based on the television series La vida es una lotería by TVN. He worked as professor of film production in Chilean and Peruvian universities and collaborated in political campaigns for Ricardo Lagos and Carlos Ominami in Chile and also in Peru and Mexico.

He taught film production at the Universidad ARCIS in Santiago and, in 1997–1998, at the extension center of the Pontifical Catholic University of Peru. In 1998 he co-founded the Chilean weekly magazine The Clinic. At Rivas y Rivas he worked as a producer, screenwriter and director; among his projects was the television series La vida es una lotería, which aired on TVN for five seasons between 2002 and 2005 and on Mega in 2006–2007. From 2000 to 2003 he was president of La Factoría, a consortium of Chilean audiovisual companies. In 2017 he premiered the documentary Isla de Guerreros: Rapa Ariki Matatoa about Easter Island's aspirations for greater autonomy, and in 2019 the documentary Al fondo a la izquierda, in which he interviews Latin American leaders. From mid-2013 he hosted the program Cambio de Switch on Radio Universidad de Chile.

== Political career ==
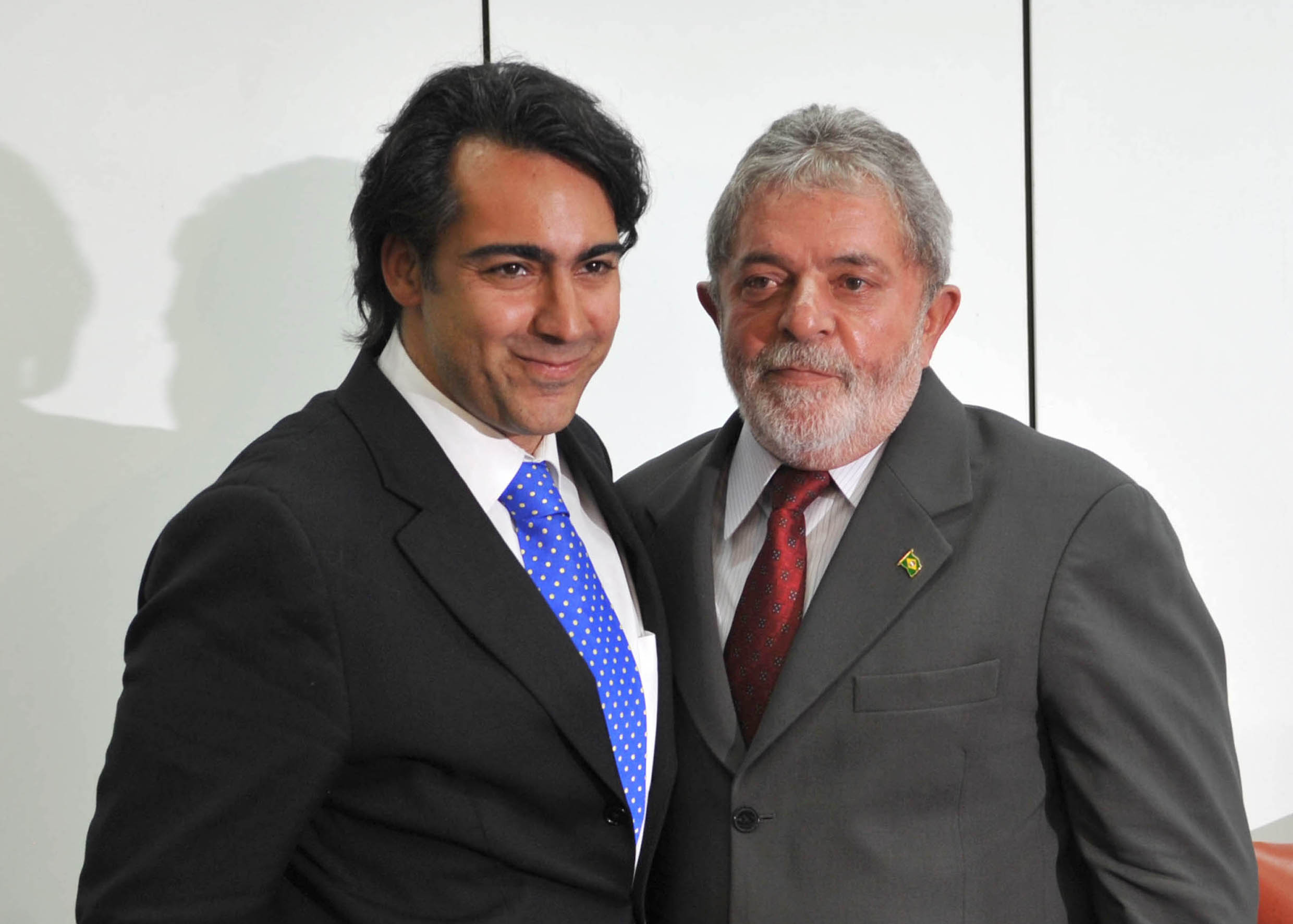
Enríquez-Ominami with President of Brazil Luiz Inácio Lula da Silva.

In December 2005 Enríquez-Ominami was elected deputy for District 10 in central Chile for a period of four years. He obtained the highest vote in that district's history. As deputy, he worked on the Science and Technology and Agricultural commissions, and presided the Investigating Commission on State-funded advertisement and the Special Commission on the study of the Chilean political regime. He has introduced around 150 bills, many of which have been approved. Between 2006 and 2010 he took part in 193 legislative initiatives, including bills on public accountability reports by legislators, organ donation, limits on re-election of legislators and municipal councillors, and discrimination in the Labor Code. In 2008 he was, together with Karla Rubilar, one of the first politicians to denounce the "false exonerados" case, involving people who improperly received compensation as political exiles or prisoners. He left office on 11 March 2010 after publishing a report on his legislative work. In December 2008, Enríquez-Ominami said he was available to compete with José Miguel Insulza and Eduardo Frei in the Concertación presidential primaries. However, after claiming the Concertación leadership changed the primary rules in order to bar him from the process, Enríquez-Ominami decided to run as an independent. With the financial support of businessman Max Marambio, he began the process of collecting nearly 36,000 signatures needed to register his independent candidacy. He made extensive use of social networking Internet sites for this effect. In June 2009 he resigned from the Socialist Party to meet the legal deadline.

Despite being relatively unknown, Enríquez-Ominami quickly rose in opinion polls, garnering 10% of support by April 2009, capturing the leftist electorate dissatisfied with the choice of Christian Democrat Eduardo Frei as the Concertación candidate. For the parallel legislative elections, he launched his own list of candidates, which was split between independent candidates (including three lawmakers seeking reelection) and members of two minor parties that supported his candidacy: the Humanist Party and the Ecologist Party. He placed the strongest candidates in districts where Concertación party-leaders were vying for seats. However, though he made a strong showing, Enríquez-Ominami ultimately fell short and was eliminated in the first round of voting with 20.13% of the vote. His parliamentary list also failed to win any seats, obtaining a low 4% of the vote. After the election, he refused to endorse either candidate, saying "Eduardo Frei and Sebastián Piñera are too much alike [...] They don't represent hope, nor change, nor the future." On December 16, his economic advisor, Paul Fontaine, joined Piñera's runoff campaign. Nearly a week later another one of his economic advisors, Luis Eduardo Escobar, joined Frei's team. Finally, four days before the election Enríquez-Ominami held a press conference where he said he was going to vote for the "candidate of the 29%," meaning to vote for Frei, but maintaining his supporters were free to choose their own candidate.

In 2010 he founded the Progressive Party (PRO), which won the mayoralty of Arica in the 2012 municipal elections. His 2013 presidential campaign was the first officially launched that year, and its government program, developed over eight months with about 800 people in working groups, proposed free education, a tax reform, and a new constitution drafted by a constituent assembly. The Allendista Socialism Movement and the Liberal Party announced their support for his candidacy in May and June 2013.

In the 2013 General Election, Enríquez-Ominami competed for the Presidency of Chile for the second time, while representing the Progressive Party. This time he secured third place obtaining only 10,98% of the votes. Enríquez-Ominami also run for the Presidency of Chile in the General Election of 2017. He gathered 5,71% of the vote and placed sixth among 8 candidates.

For the runoff he endorsed Alejandro Guillier. In May 2018 he announced that he was stepping away from active politics "for now". He is a founder of the Puebla Group, a forum of progressive Latin American political figures.

In 2021 the Electoral Service (Servel) had suspended his political rights because of pending criminal proceedings, but the Constitutional Court granted an injunction, and Servel restored them on 22 August 2021. He announced a fourth presidential candidacy that day and registered it on 23 August as the Progressive Party's candidate. On 4 September a Santiago electoral court ordered him excluded from the electoral roll over his links to the OAS case, but the Elections Qualifying Tribunal reversed that decision on 10 September. In the November 2021 election he received 7.61% of the vote. Before the runoff he urged voters to choose between "change" and "continuity", referring to Gabriel Boric and José Antonio Kast respectively.

Enríquez-Ominami has long advocated replacing the 1980 Constitution through a constituent assembly, a proposal he campaigned on in 2013. He called for approving the draft constitution in the September 2022 plebiscite, which was rejected, and in the December 2023 plebiscite he campaigned against the second draft, which was also rejected.

In May 2025 Enríquez-Ominami announced a fifth presidential bid as an independent, which required about 40,000 signatures to qualify for the ballot. In August 2025 he announced that he had gathered them. In the first round on 16 November 2025 he received 1.19% of the vote, while Jeannette Jara and José Antonio Kast advanced to the runoff. Kast won the runoff on 14 December.

== Legal proceedings (SQM, OAS cases) ==
In 2016 prosecutors opened an investigation, formalized on 19 October 2016, into Enríquez-Ominami's alleged involvement in the SQM case, concerning irregular political financing through invoices that prosecutors described as ideologically false; the State Defense Council filed a complaint for fraud against the treasury on 28 October. He denied wrongdoing. In 2018 he was formally charged in connection with the OAS case, relating to the alleged submission of false documents to the electoral authority to obtain an election-expense reimbursement. In April 2021 the tax-offense charges were dismissed, and in August 2021 a court acquitted him of the remaining charges, while his former adviser Cristián Warner was convicted of tax offenses. A separate inquiry opened in 2018 over an invoice used in his 2017 campaign accounts was closed in March 2024 without charges.

=== Books ===
- Ominami, Carlos; Enríquez-Ominami, Marco (2004). Animales políticos: diálogos filiales. Santiago: Planeta. ISBN 978-956-247-333-0.
- Navia, Patricio (2009). El díscolo: conversaciones con Marco Enríquez-Ominami. Santiago: Debate.
- Enríquez-Ominami, Marco (2017). Una vida política: autobiografía. Santiago: Debate.
- Enríquez-Ominami, Marco; Flores Cáceres, Daniel (2026). Espejo para príncipes: una guía de comunicación política para asesores, candidatos y votantes. Fondo de Cultura Económica.

=== Filmography ===
- Vine a decirles que me voy (1995, documentary)
- Chile, los héroes están fatigados (2002, documentary)
- La vida es una lotería (2005, television series)
- Mansacue (2008, film)
- Isla de Guerreros: Rapa Ariki Matatoa (2017, documentary)
- Al fondo a la izquierda (2019, documentary)
