= Memorial for the Disappeared =

Cemetery memorial in Santiago, Chile

Coordinates: 33°24′45″S 70°38′40″W

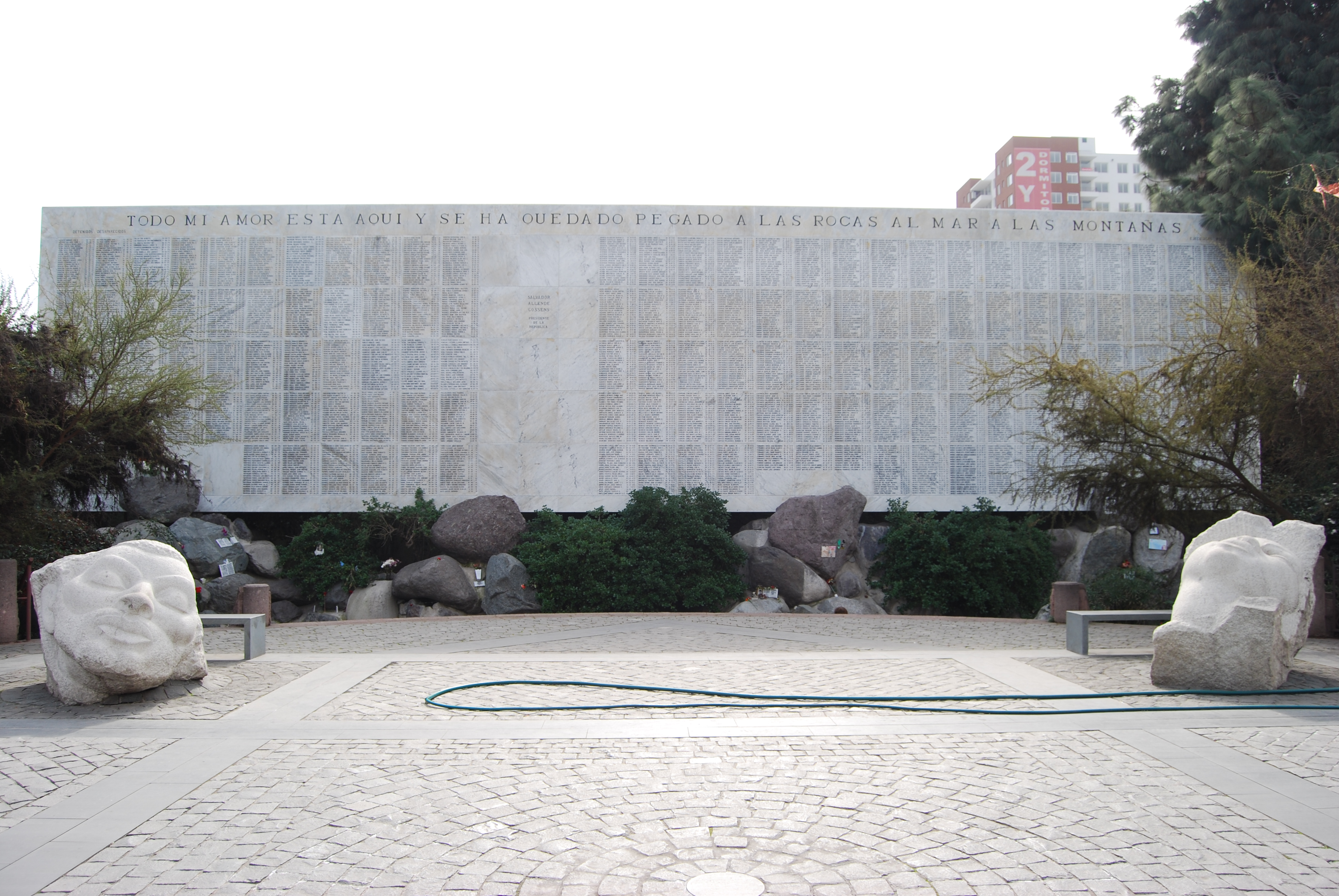
Memorial wall

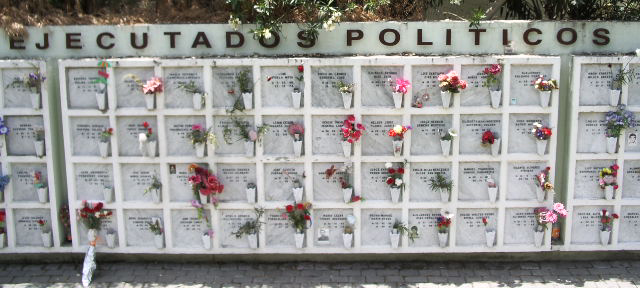
Names and funerary urns

The Memorial for the Disappeared (Spanish: Memorial del Detenido Desaparecido y del Ejecutado Político) is a memorial wall at the entrance to Santiago General Cemetery in Santiago, Chile, commemorating the 3,000 people disappeared or murdered following the 1973 Chilean coup d'état (detenidos desaparecidos). Inscribed in the long, high, marble wall are the names of 3,000 people disappeared or murdered following the 1973 Chilean coup d'état. The wall serves as a crypt. When newly identified remains are brought to the wall, their listed names move from "disappeared" to "deceased". The memorial is frequented by visitors and at its base are piled flower bouquets, photographs, and calls for governmental action. Atop the wall is a line from Chilean poet Raul Zurita, translated as, "All my love is here and here has stayed: Tied to the rocks, to the sea, to the mountains". It is the best known Chilean memory site.

== See also ==
- Patio 29
