= Marcello Ferrada de Noli =

Swedish professor and epidemiologist

Professor Emeritus Marcello Ferrada de Noli
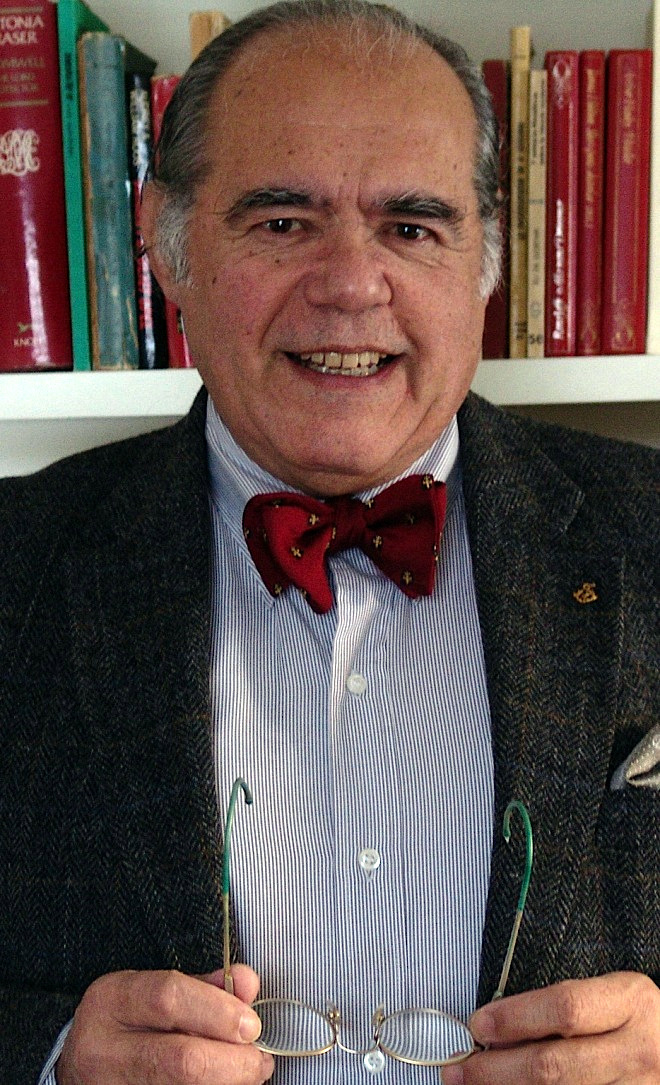
- Ferrada de Noli in 2010
- Born: 25 July 1943 (age 83); Chile
- Known for: Contributions to psychiatry & epidemiology research
- Title: Professor, Doctor of Medicine
- Board member of: SWEDHR board of directors, The Indicter Magazine Editorial Board
- Awards: Title of distinction Professor Emeritus, Sweden 2007

Academic background
- Education: Universidad de Concepción, Karolinska Institute, Harvard Medical School

Academic work
- Discipline: Epidemiology, Cross-Cultural Psychiatry, Injury Epidemiology
- Website: www.ferradanoliwordpress.com

Marcello Vittorio Ferrada de Noli (born 25 July 1943) is a Swedish professor emeritus of epidemiology, and medicine doktor in psychiatry (PhD Karolinska Institute, Sweden). He was research fellow and lecturer at Harvard Medical School, and was later head of the research group of International and Cross-Cultural Injury Epidemiology at the Karolinska Institute until 2009. Ferrada de Noli is known for his investigations on suicidal behaviour associated with severe trauma. He is the founder of the NGO Swedish Doctors for Human Rights (SWEDHR). He is also an author, and painting artist.

== Academic career ==
Studies: Bachillerato universitario (Chile) in philosophy, Pontifical Catholic University of Valparaiso, 1962. University of Concepción, 1962–1968. Profesor de Filosofía degree, University of Chile, 1969. Licentiate in Medical Sciences (psychiatry), 1994, and PhD in psychiatry in 1996, Karolinska Institute, Sweden. Postdoctoral in Social Medicine, Harvard Medical School, 1997–1998.

Ferrada de Noli was full professor of psychology at the University of Chile, Arica, 1970 and an invited professor at Universidad Autónoma de Nuevo León, Mexico, 1972. At the time of the 1973 Chilean coup d'état he was full professor of psychosocial methods at the University of Concepción.

Ferrada de Noli held various research positions at the Karolinska Institute in Stockholm, from assistant researcher at the Social and Forensic Psychiatry Department (1987) to Senior Research Scientist at the Department of Clinical Neuroscience, Psychiatry Section (1997). professor of health psychology, University of Tromsø, Norway 1997. He qualified as a full professor of health promotion, and as a professor of cross-cultural psychology, at the University of Bergen, Norway, 1999, and was thereafter invited professor of cross-cultural psychology at the Norwegian University of Science and Technology, Norway, 2000. In Sweden, he was full professor of public-health epidemiology at the University of Gävle, position shared at Karolinska Institute, Department of Social Medicine 2002–2007. Invited professor of International Health, University of Gävle, 2007. professor emeritus (title), 2007. He was named affiliate professor at the medical faculty, University of Chile, 2006.

His work has been cited in about 2390 scientific articles and books, In the journal Clinical Psychology Review (2009), three authors wrote that Ferrada de Noli and co-workers had found a new pathway in the pathogenesis of suicidal behaviour associated with PTSD. The review concluded that Ferrada de Noli and his co-workers "demonstrated that among refugees with PTSD, major depression was not substantially associated with heightened levels of suicidal behaviour". Meaning that the path to severe suicide attempts in PTSD victims was not mediated by depression – as it was thought before – but linked directly to PTSD. The discovery indicated modifications in prevention and treatment of suicidal behaviour. Another finding was significant correlations between specific methods in suicidal behavior and methods used in torture inflicted to prisoners later diagnosed with PTSD. In the book Suicide and the Holocaust, David Lester referred to that finding, and summarized: "for example those subjected to water torture thought of using drowning". He established ethnicity as significant risk factor for suicidal deaths in Sweden, and found statistically significant markers associating Socioeconomic Status (SES) and suicidal behaviour in Sweden. From 2004 to 2007 and 2007–2012 he was appointed by the Swedish government alternate scientific member of the Swedish Central Ethical Review Board Etikprövningsnämnd for research.

== Political activism ==
The Swedish newspaper Dagens Nyheter (2008) described Ferrada de Noli as "left-liberal", and newspaper Ystads Allehanda (2013) writes, "Left-liberal. But his conservative past continued to chase him". In newspaper Expressen (2018) Ferrada de Noli declared he participated as "social-libertarian" in the foundation of the guerrilla organization MIR in 1965, besides having been briefly active in the Swedish Liberal Party during the 1980s – which at the time had a social-liberal profile in Swedish politics. In an op-ed in Dagens Nyheter (2015), Ferrada de Noli advocated for Sweden to return being a neutral country "as it was in Olof Palme's times", and "resuming an active role in the work for peace and respect for human rights in the world". Ferrada de Noli has been referred to as one of the founders of the Revolutionary Left Movement (Chile), MIR (1965), and co-author of the "Political-Military Thesis" approved in the foundation congress. MIR was a far left guerrilla organisation with roots in the Socialist Party of Chile, where he had participated in the regional board of its youth organisation in Concepción. MIR was considered Pinochet regime's "number one counterinsurgency target". He was detained several times by the government authorities, and was among the 13 leaders of MIR listed in the national arrest warrant issued by the Chilean authorities prosecuting MIR's subversion activities in 1969. He was finally captured and held incommunicado in Concepción's Prison.

=== 1973 Chilean coup d'état ===
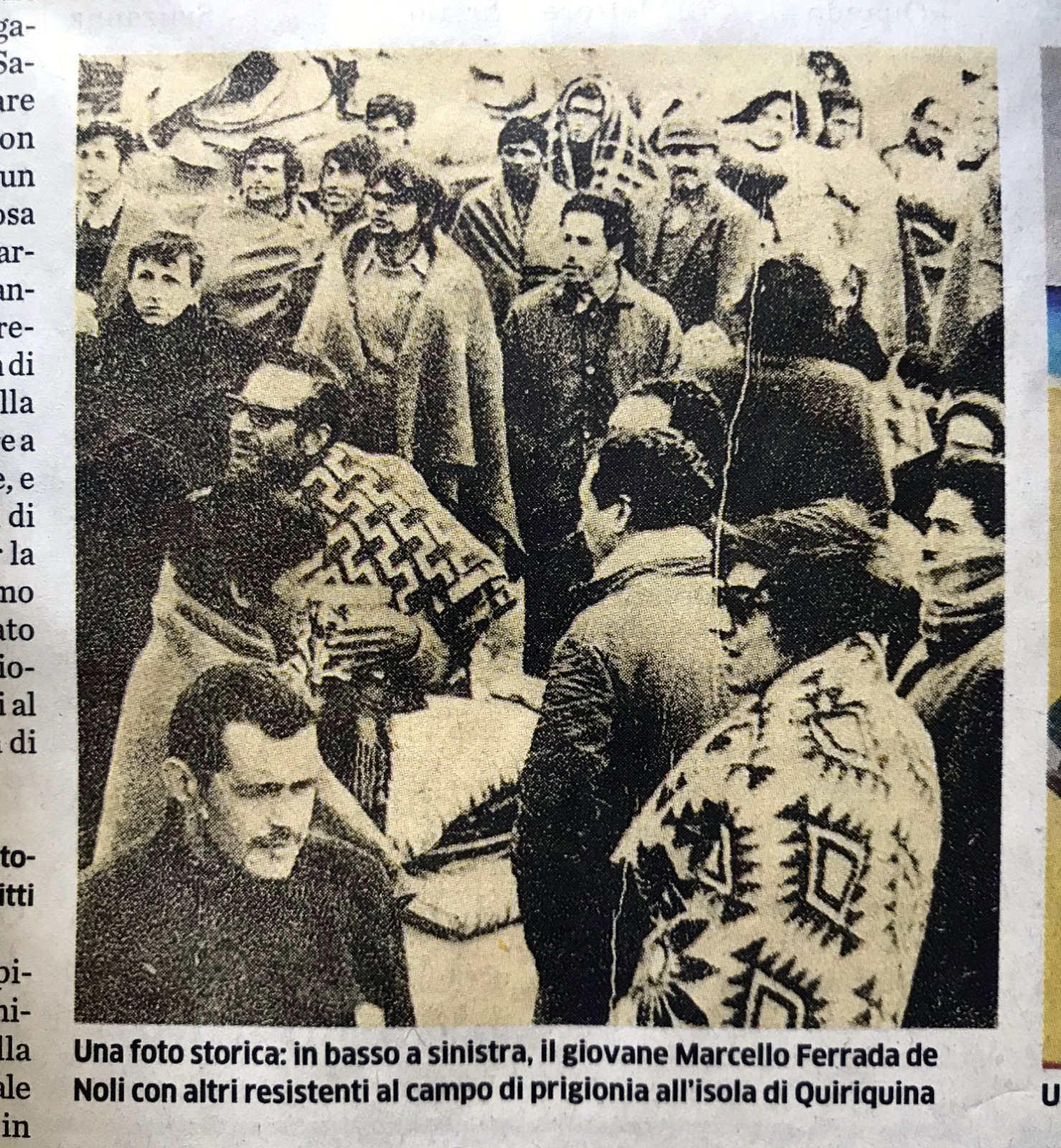
Text in the image – "A historical photo: the young Marcello Ferrada de Noli and other Resistance members at Quiriquina Island prisoners camp". L'Eco di Bergamo Jan 20, 2019.

In "Story of a Death Foretold: The Coup against Salvador Allende, 11 September 1973", historian Oscar Guardiola-Rivera reports that Marcello Ferrada and other members of the MIR "launched resistance operations on the night of 11 September" in the town of Concepción. Ferrada’s actions were later described by a member of the MIR leadership in Concepción as an "epic act of resistance in downtown Concepción". After the aborted MIR resistance to the military in Concepción ensuing the 1973 Chilean coup d'état, Ferrada de Noli was captured and held prisoner in Concepción's Stadium and in Quiriquina Island. Alongside the imprisonment, the military terminated his professorship at Concepción University. In a photo of the epoch in newspaper La Tercera, Ferrada de Noli appeared among prisoners described as "extremists that have attacked the military forces with fire weapons". Later transported anew to Concepción Stadium, from where, with help of his brother (an Army officer) and other members of his family, was released in 1974, to immediately be evicted from the country. General Agustín Toro Dávila (Concepción's military head) signed the deportation order. He went to Italy to participate as a witness at the Russell Tribunal in Rome, which reviewed human rights transgressions by the Government Junta of Chile.

In Sweden (1975), he continued in MIR until 1977 as head of MIR and Junta Coordinadora Revolucionaria counter-intelligence activity in Scandinavia, undertaking aimed the monitoring of Operation Condor. In 1976, alongside the reasuming of his academic career, he started working as psychotherapist at health services for political refugees in Stockholm County, and 1989 in crisis therapy provided at the Swedish Red Cross Project for traumatized and torture-survivor refugees. During mid-80s he participated in the Swedish Liberal Party. In 2014 he founded the ONG Swedish Professors and Doctors for Human Rights (SWEDHR). In 2015 he founded the journal The Indicter, focused on political epidemiology, political philosophy, geopolitics and human rights.

=== Controversies ===
==== Early controversies ====
Earlier academic controversies have involved articles in Swedish medical journals and media on his public opposition to the Swedish diagnose "utbrändhet" (work-related stress 'burnout'), which he said didn't have epidemiological ground. After he wrote in DN that one risk factor for "utbrändhet" in women could be stress caused by a double working load, at the job and then at home –contradicting the notion of an advanced Swedish gender equality, Minister Mona Sahlin commented that his thesis was "a bid insulting, to say the least". Later in 2005, Aftonbladet published a half front-page headline, "Professor in attack against the burned-out". It referred an interview where Ferrada de Noli stated that to be displeased with a job cannot be equated with a medical diagnosis, and a new debate ensued in the Swedish media. In 1998, at that time professor in Norway, Ferrada de Noli requested the legal extradition of General Augusto Pinochet, to be judged in a European court on allegations of torture and war crimes.

==== Assange case ====
Ferrada de Noli has been criticized in the Swedish media for his public defence of Julian Assange. He published the book Sweden vs. Assange. Human Rights Issues, claiming that the case was instead political. In 2011, via Jennifer Robinson, he submitted to the London Court deliberating the extradition of Assange, a testimony based on his investigation "Swedish Trial by Media". In 2012, Swedish Radio said in a broadcast that Ferrada de Noli has implicated "a social democratic feminist working together with 'arms-(exports) companies' trying to get Assange". Ferrada Noli denied that and asked Swedish Radio for a retraction. In a report by the Italian newspaper L'Eco di Bergamo (January 2019), he was asked why he defended Assange's deeds "instead of regard it illegal or criminal"; he replied, "According to International Law, what could instead be considered as criminal is what Assange has denounced", In 2019, Libertarian Books Europe published his second book on the case, Sweden's Geopolitical Case Against Assange 2010–2019.

==== Questioning of reported evidence on the alleged gas attacks in Khan Shaykhun ====
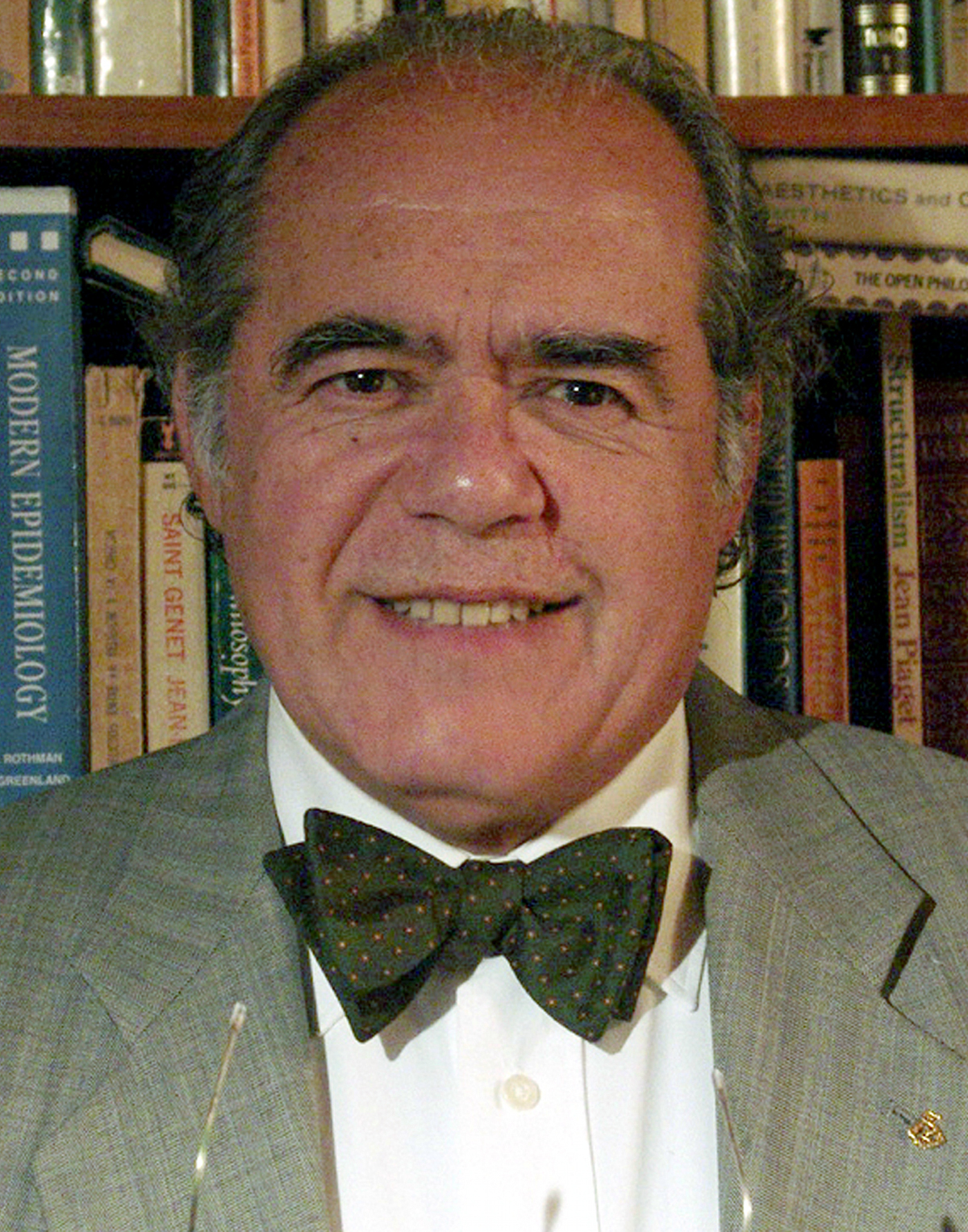
Professor Ferrada de Noli, Karolinska Institute, 2007.

In 2017, Ferrada de Noli elicited international controversy over his publications and statements questioning the evidence around allegations of gas attacks in Syria by government forces. In December 2017, the Russian permanent representative to the UN submitted to the United Nations Security Council (UNSC) an article by him in his magazine The Indicter, in which he alleged epidemiological bias in the report issued by the OPCW-UN Joint Investigative Mechanism on the Khan Shaykhun chemical attack of April 2017 in Syria. SWEDHR publications in The Indicter authored by Ferrada de Noli have been cited or included in documents submitted at the UNSC by the Russian and Syrian ambassadors, added the Russian envoys at the OPCW or the ambassador to the UK. European mainstream media, e.g. Le Figaro, ARD/BR, and Der Spiegel, raised criticism of his geopolitical articles published by SWEDHR and in The Indicter. Dagens Nyheter, together with other Swedish newspapers, e.g. Aftonbladet Expressen, Göteborgs-Posten, Västerbottens-Kuriren, Uppsala Nya Tidning, also addressed Ferrada de Noli's "frequent interviews in Russian media and Russian-government international propaganda channels", and questioned the mentions of his work and his organization SWEDHR at press briefings of the Ministry of Foreign Affairs of the Russian Federation. Ferrada de Noli contested the media criticism in the journal of the Swedish Medical Association Läkartidningen, claiming that SWEDHR is "absolutely independent". In an interview on the subject, he declared, "We only have our own line. Whether that coincide or not with the positions of different countries, that is not our intention".

==== Geneva Press Club ====
The Geneva Press Club organized a conference in November 2017 to debate events in Syria. Reporters Without Borders (RWB) called for its cancellation, arguing against an invitation to Ferrada de Noli to hold a keynote address, being "president of an organization that, according with our information, acts as a tool of Russian propaganda." Ferrada de Noli called RWB on Twitter to "publish your evidence now, or shame". Guy Mettan, president of the Geneva Press Club, dismissed the attacks as "not worth of journalism". The conference ultimately took place with police protection due to reported threats.

Myrotvorets

That same year, ensuing a Dagens Nyheter report on SWEDHR pejorative criticism of Ukraine's first junta's ideology, the website Myrotvorets listed Ferrada de Noli, "founder of the organisation Swedish Doctors for Human Rights", together with other names e.g. Silvio Berlusconi, Roger Walters, Gerhard Schröder, etc., "whose actions have signs of crimes against the national security of Ukraine, peace, human security, and the international law".

==== Skripal case ====
At early events around the Skripal poison incident in Salisbury, Ferrada de Noli was subject of new criticism in Danish TV and Swedish media (e.g. Danish newspaper Dagens Nyheter). Ferrada de Noli's thesis was that the poison Novichok would have been developed in Uzbekistan, not in Russia, and its possession by other countries could not be ruled out. According to Dagens Nyheter, he would have declared in an interview done with him by the newspaper April 2, 2018, that the Skripal incident could be a case of false flag in anticipating an eventual confrontation sought by the United Kingdom against Russia.

=== Covid-19 pandemic ===
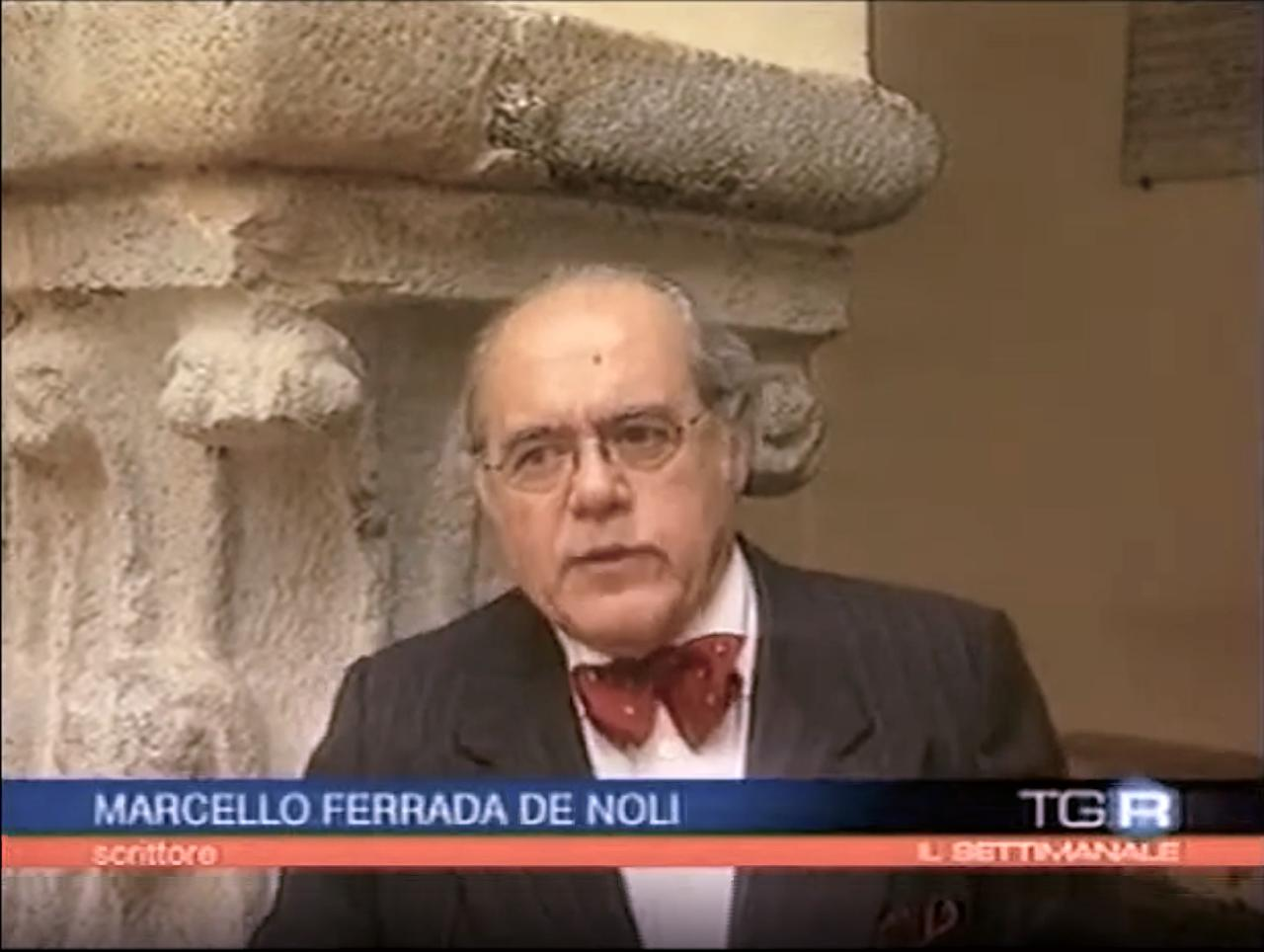
Marcello Ferrada de Noli, RAI 3 (Italy) 1 Nov 2020.

As professor emeritus in epidemiology, Ferrada de Noli has opposed the herd immunity strategy, said to have being implemented in Sweden. According to him, that approach would have been a main factor for the "thousands of unnecessary deaths" among the elderly in Sweden 2020. Instead, he publicly advocated for stricter lockdown measures, widespread testing and mass vaccination. His statements were mentioned in European news and interviews, e.g. Il Foglio, which called him "celebre epidemiologo". The Swedish Enterprise Media Monitor included Ferrada de Noli in the top-ten list of professors and experts that participated in the COVID-19 media debat in Sweden 2020. Notwithstanding, mainstream media in Sweden criticised him sternly; e.g. newspaper Expressen named him, together with Cecilia Söderberg-Nauclér and Lena Einhorn, a "saboteur" of the Public Health Agency of Sweden.

Italian media reported that Ferrada de Noli was to donate, at his own expense, 740 doses of Sputnik vaccine to the survived elderly of San Giovanni Bianco, in the Bergamo province, as the Orobic territory was the epicenter of the pandemic 2020. Italian local authorities first welcomed the initiative. At that time, November 2020, Sputnik was the only vaccine available in the market. Nevertheless, as Corriere della Sera later reported, his donation could not be accepted because European Medicines Agency EMA had not approved Sputnik for its use in the EU. The news about Ferrada de Noli's initiative had also extensive coverage in Russian media, including the government's gazette. Later, Swedish newspaper SvD suggested he was part of a Russian state campaign to discredit the Anglo/Swedish AstraZeneca vaccine. This led to a libel-report by Ferrada de Noli against SvD at Sweden's Media Ombudsman. In November 2021, he publicly advocated for mandatory vaccination against COVID-19, "If I had my way, I would make getting vaccinated – with the exception of clinical cases – obligatory for all citizens of all countries".

== Freedom of speech ==
In recent years, Ferrada de Noli has focused his publications in the journal The Indicter and on social media on freedom of speech issues. In March 2020 he co-signed a letter published in The Lancet advocating for the case of Julian Assange, for "it relates to law, freedom of speech, freedom of the press, journalism, publishing, and politics". In his book Human Rights for All (2024), he critiques the concept of "disinformation". In the books EU's Censorship on Freedom of Speech: DSA Echoes Repression of Fascism for War Propaganda (2025) and Censorship and the Crisis of European Society (2026), De Noli analyses the European Union's Digital Services Act (DSA), describing some of its procedures as "shadow banning of dissident voices". He claims Google implements these at the DSA's behest. His research findings show a statistically significant reduction in Google Search results for known DSA critics before and after the DSA's enforcement on major search engines. Comparing Google Search with Yahoo Search and Bing Search, De Noli found a statistically significant difference in results as well for other DSA critics, such as Virginie Joron, Paul Coleman, and Matt Taibbi.

Ferrada de Noli also criticizes what he sees as the erosion of free speech rights for European citizens in geopolitical contexts. For example, he has condemned the Swedish government's decision not to hold a national referendum on NATO membership.

== Awards ==
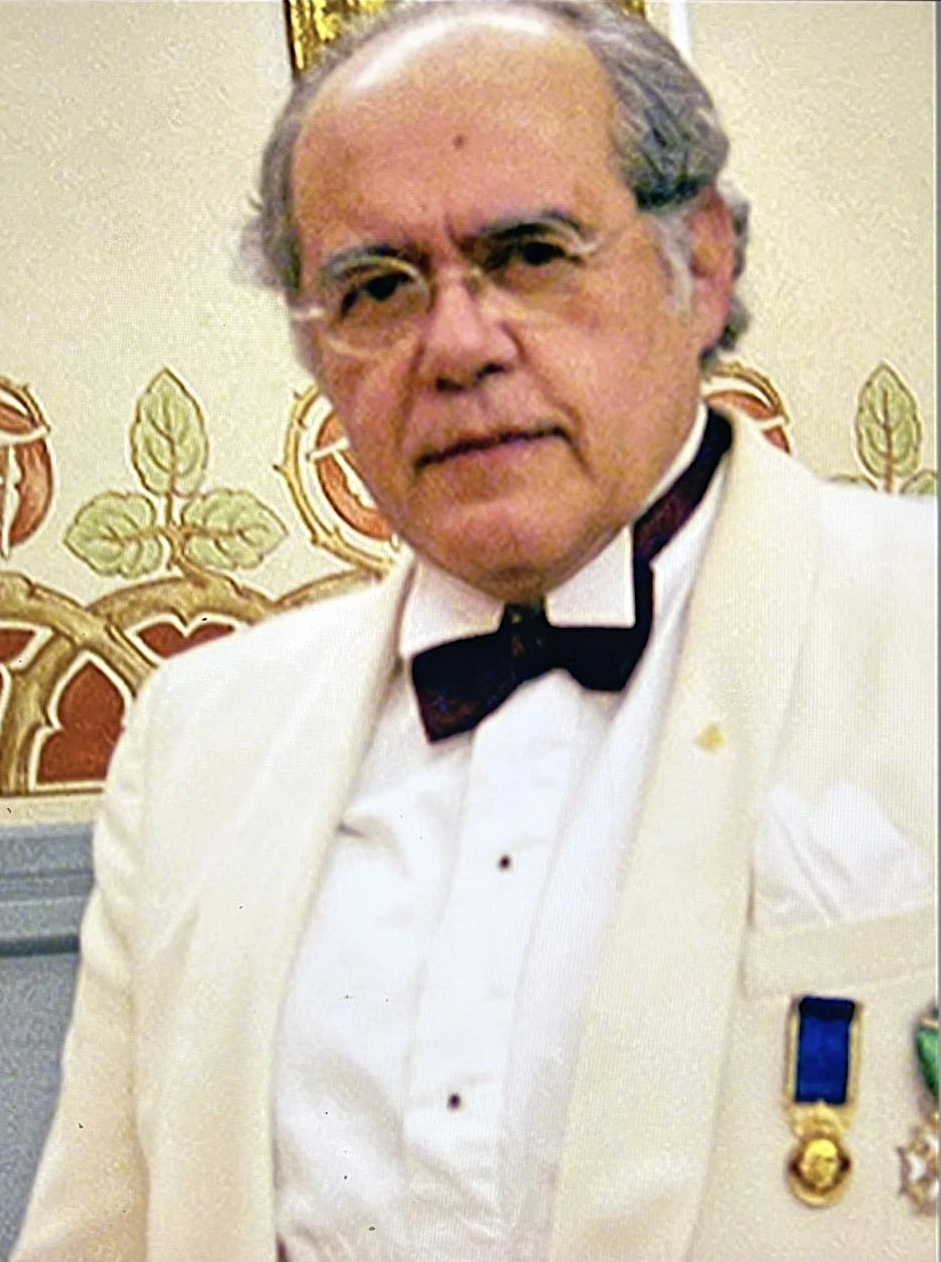
Prof Marcello Ferrada de Noli. Swedish reward medal "For Zealous and Devoted Service of the Realm"

- University of Gävle, Sweden, 2007. "Title of Distinction Professor Emeritus. In value of meritorious academic services".
- Swedish Reward medal "For Zealous and Devoted Service of the Realm".

== Family ==
Marcello Ferrada de Noli was born in Copiapó, Chile, in family of Italian origin (Noli), descendants to the nobleman and navigator Antonio de Noli. His grandfather Giuseppe Vittorio Noli is described in Region Atacama as "a settler from Genoa" who made his fortune in viñeñards and wine production in Copiapó. His father was a company owner and retired officer in the armed forces, and his mother was a professor at the University of Concepción. He is the father of seven children, among them Swedish writers Caroline Ringskog Ferrada-Noli and Nicholas Ringskog Ferrada-Noli. He lives in Bergamo, Italy.

== Arte de Noli ==
His first painting exhibitions in Europe were at the Centro Studi Artistici La Giada, Rome at Feltrinelli Editore, Rome 1974, and at Galleria Moran. In Sweden, at Kulturhuset, Stockholm, 1977, an exhibition of his paintings with political content was organized by Amnesty International. The theme of the exhibition was "The Desaparecidos", referring to the missed prisoners ensuing the 1973 Chilean coup d'état. The Embassy of Chile in Stockholm organized in 2004 a retrospective art exhibition with Ferrada de Noli's paintings and portrait works. His signature is Arte de Noli.

== Books ==
- 1962 Cantos de Rebelde Esperanza (Poetry) ISBN 978-91-88747-10-5
- 1967 No, no me digas señor (Play, on stage Teatro Concepción 1967, published 2015) ISBN 978-91-88747-16-7 scanned
- 1969 Universidad y Superstructura (Philosophy) University of Concepcion, thesis
- 1972 Teoría y Método de la Concientización (Social psychology)
- 1982 The Theory of Alienation and the Diathesis of Psychosomatic Pathology (Philosophy, psychiatry)
- 1993 Chalice of Love (Philosophy, life meaning, fiction) ISBN 978-91-981615-9-5
- 1995 Psychiatric and Forensic Findings in Definite and Undetermined Suicides (Epidemiology, forensic psychiatry), Karolinska Institutet, Dept Clinical Neuroscience, Psychiatry Section, 1995.
- 1996 Posttraumatic Stress Disorder in Immigrants to Sweden (Psychiatry),Karolinska Institutet, Dept Clinical Neuroscience, 1996. ISBN 91-628-1984-4
- 2003 Efter tortyr (Contributor author) (Torture, psychiatry), Centre for Survivors of Torture and Trauma (CTD), Estocolmo. Liber, 1993. ISBN 91-634-0678-0
- 2005 Fighting Pinochet (Testimony, resistance). ISBN 978-91-88747-00-6
- 2007 Theses on the cultural premises of pseudoscience (Epistemology) ISBN 978-91-88747-05-1
- 2008 Kejsarens utbrända kläder (Epidemiology, psychiatry) ISBN 978-91-88747-01-3
- 2009 Oxford Textbook of Suicidology and Suicide Prevention, Oxford University Press, 1a ed., 2009. Print ISBN 9780198570059.(Contributor author) (Psychiatry)
- 2013 Da Noli a Capo Verde (Contributor author) (History) ISBN 978-88-8849-82-01
- 2013 Antonio de Noli and the Beginning of the New World Discoveries (Editor)(Contributor author)(History) ISBN 978-91-981615-0-2
- 2014 Sweden VS. Assange. Human Rights Issues (Geopolitics, human rights) ISBN 978-91-981615-0-2
- 2018 Aurora Política de Bautista van Schouwen (Book chapter) ISBN 978-91-88747-11-2
- 2018 Con Bautista van Schouwen (Political history) ISBN 978-91-88747-08-2
- 2019 Pablo de Rokha y la joven generación del MIR (Political history) ISBN 978-91-981615-5-7
- 2019 Sweden's Geopolitical Case Against Assange 2010–2019 (Geopolitics, history, human rights) ISBN 978-91-88747-13-6
- 2020 Rebeldes Con Causa – Part 1 (Political history, human rights) ISBN 978-91-981615-2-6. Second edition (2026) ISBN 978-91-88747-17-4
- 2021 Lo Paradojal de la Vida. Reflexiones dialécticas (Philosophy) ISBN 978-91-88747-10-5
- 2021 Los que fundamos el MIR (Political history) ISBN 978-91-88747-19-8
- 2021 Amore e Resistenza (Poetry) ISBN 978-91-88747-20-4
- 2021 La mujer de Walter y otras historias (Fiction) ISBN 978-91-88747-02-0. Second edition (2026) ISBN 978-91-88747-21-1
- 2021 Kejsarens utbrända kläder (Epidemiology, psychiatry) ISBN 978-91-88747-01-3
- 2021 Si Bemol de Combate (Poetry) ISBN 978-91-88747-33-4
- 2021 Esistenza Dialettica (Life meaning, political history) ISBN 978-91-88747-27-3
- 2021 Mi Lucha Contra Pinochet (Spanish translation of Fighting Pinochet ) ISBN 978-91-88747-91-4
- 2023 Cuando Conocí al Comandante Che Guevara y su Tesis de Humanismo Socialista (political theory) ISBN 978-91-88747-67-9
- 2024 Road to Malatesta (Philosophy, political history) ISBN 978-91-88747-39-6
- 2024 Volver a los Diecisiete. Diario de Miguel Enríquez (Political history, biography) ISBN 978-91-88747-02-0
- 2025 Human Rights for All (Political history, human rights) ISBN 978-91-88747-30-3
- 2025 EU's Censorship on Freedom of Speech – DSA Echoes of Fascist Repression in War Propaganda (Freedom of Speech, censorship) ISBN 978-91-88747-37-2
- 2025 Back to Seventeen. Biographical, Historical, and Existential Reflections on the Diary of Miguel Enríquez (Historical, biographical, psychological and existential analyses) ISBN 978-91-88747-35-8
- 2026 Censorship and the Crisis of European Society (Political philosophy, censorship, freedom of Speech) ISBN 978-91-88747-29-7
- 2026 From Guatemala to Venezuela. Economic and Human Costs of U.S. Interventions in Latin America 1954–2026. (History, political epidemiology) ISBN 978-91-88747-99-0
- 2026 Intervenciones que Matan. La Doctrina Monroe en América Latina 1846–2026 (History, political epidemiology) ISBN 978-91-88747-17-4
- 2026 Estallidos Sociales. Filosofía Política de la Privación Material y Humana (Political philosophy, political history) ISBN 978-91-88747-98-3
- 2026 Arte e Resistenza – Retratti, Figurative e Astratto (Cronologia delle opere) ISBN 978-91-88747-24-2
- 2026 Art and Resistance – Portraits, Figurative and Abstract (selected works, 1973–2026 ) ISBN 978-91-88747-34-1
