= White Chileans =

Chilenos blancos (Spanish)

Total population
- White ancestry predominates 12,500,000 (estimated) ranging in 2025 from 67% of the Chilean population to 88.9% White / non indigenous (There is no official census data)

Regions with significant populations
- Mainly in Central Chile, Coquimbo, Biobío, Los Ríos, Los Lagos, Aysén and Magallanes

Languages
- Majority: Spanish: Minority: Basque; Chilote; English; Italian; German; Serbo-Croatian; Arabic

Religion
- Majority: Christianity; Minority: Irreligion

Related ethnic groups
- Europeans; West Asians; White Argentines; White Peruvians; White Colombians; White Paraguayans; Others

White Chileans (Spanish: Chilenos blancos) are Chileans who have predominantly or total European or West Asian ancestry, these stand out for having light or olive skin. White Chileans are currently the largest racial group in Chile.

== History ==
During colonial times in the eighteenth century, an important flux of emigrants from Spain populated Chile, mostly Basques, who contributed to the Chilean economy and rose rapidly in the social hierarchy and became the political elite that still dominates the country.

European migration in the 19th century did not result in a remarkable change in the ethnic composition of Chile, except in the Magallanes Region and the city of Concepción in the Biobío Region.

Spain and France were the largest source of European immigration to Chile during the 17th and 18th centuries, specially from the deep southern parts of Andalusia and Extremadura, which contributed to the Chilean ethnogenesis with thousands of peasants who migrated to the fertile lands of the Chilean Central Valley alongside the Basque merchants who started to arrive in the 18th century in great numbers.

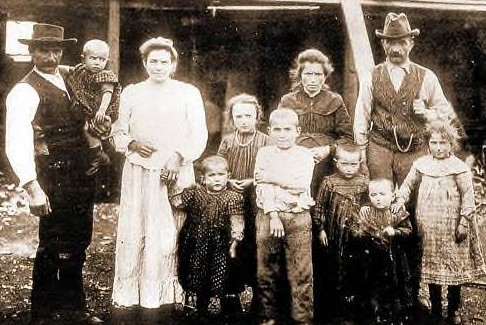
Italian immigrants in Capitán Pastene, southern Chile.

The largest contingent of people to have arrived in post-independence Chile came from Spain and from the Basque country, a region divided between northern Spain and southern France. Note that this phenomenon occurs not only in Chile, but also in every Autonomous Community of Spain, as well as in other Latin American countries – one can see that a substantial portion of their populations have one or two surnames of Basque or Navarre origin.

In 1903, a fleet of 88 Canarian families—400 persons—arrived in Budi Lake, that currently have more than 1,000 descendants, as a response to the government's call to populate this region and signed contracts for the benefit of a private company. While many Canarians obeyed their servitude, some of those who disobeyed the provisions of repopulation tried to escape their servitude and were arrested, and the indigenous Mapuche people took pity on the plight of these Canarians who were established on their former lands. The Mapuches welcomed them and joined their demonstrations in the so-called "revolt of the Canarians", and many Canarians integrated into Mapuche population to add the large mestizo population that exists in Chile. Chile's various waves of non-Spanish immigrants include Italians, Irish, French, Arabs, Greeks, Germans, English, Scots, Croats, and Poles.

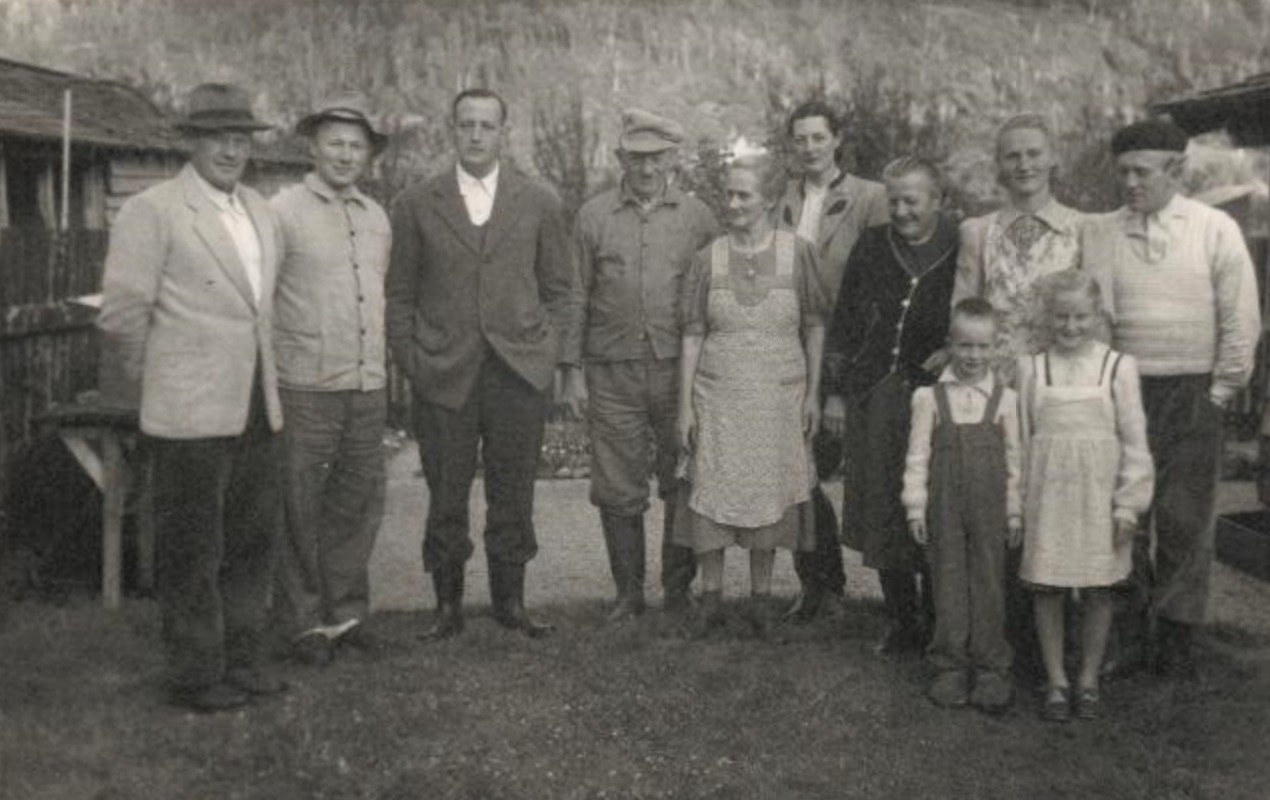
German settlers in the Aysén Region in 1951.

In 1848 an important and substantial German immigration took place, laying the foundation for the German-Chilean community. Sponsored by the Chilean government for the colonization of the southern region, the Germans (including German-speaking Swiss, Silesians, Alsatians, Austrians, Sudeten Germans, and Poles thru Partitions of Poland), strongly influenced the cultural and racial composition of the southern provinces of Chile. It is difficult to count the number of descendants of Germans in Chile, given the great amount of time since 1848. Because many areas of southern Chile were sparsely populated, the traces of German immigration there are quite noticeable.

In 1939, under the supervision of poet-diplomat Pablo Neruda, the SS Winnipeg, a French steamer, arrived at the port of Valparaíso with 2,200 Spanish Republican exiles who had been granted political asylum by the administration of President Pedro Aguirre Cerda. The passengers included Mauricio Amster, José Balmes, Roser Bru, Isidro Corbinos, and Víctor Pey.

== Demographics ==
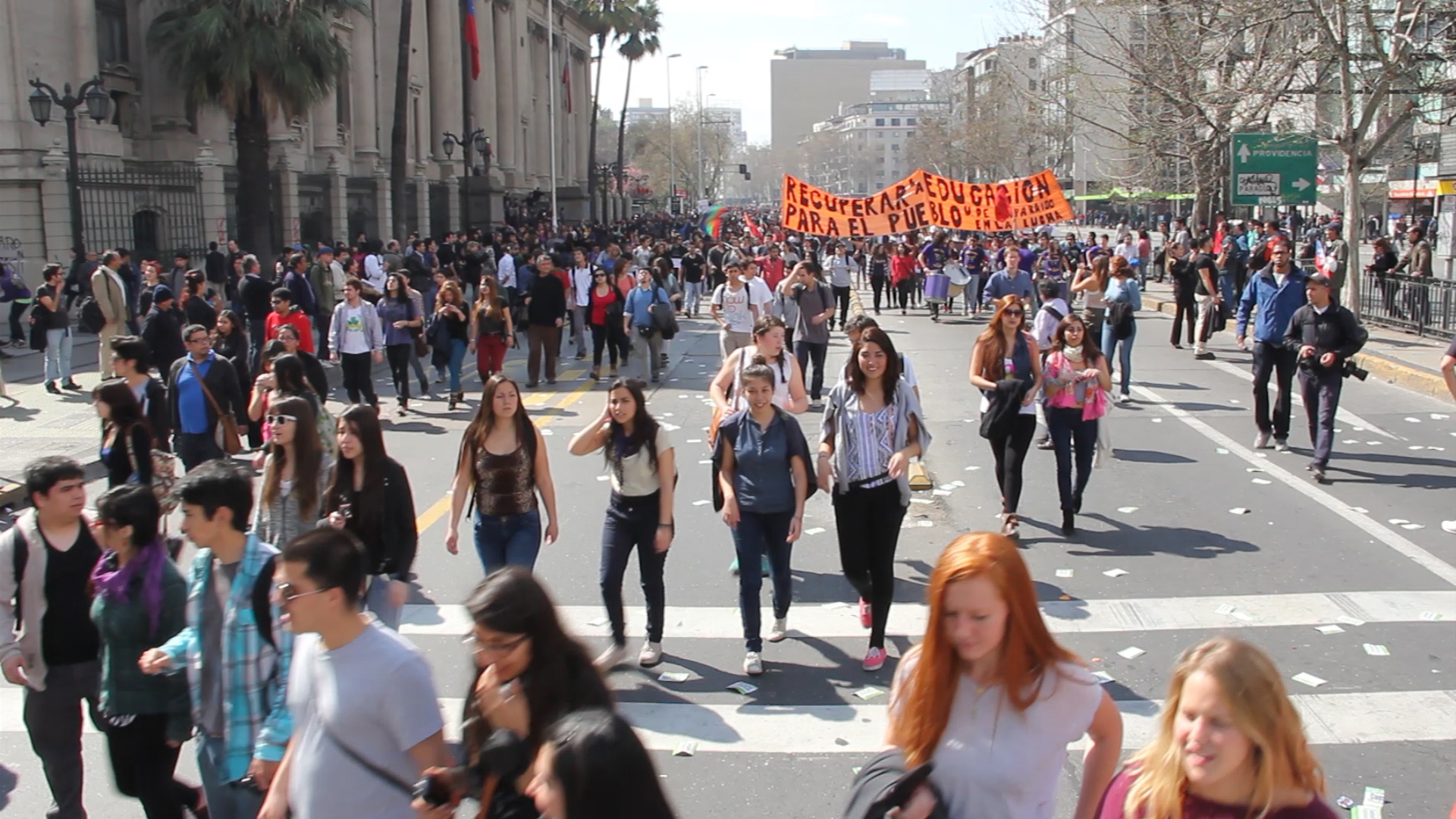
Chilean students marching near the National Library of Chile.

Scholarly estimates of the White population in Chile vary dramatically, ranging from 53% to 90%. According to a study by the University of Chile about 60% of the Chilean population is Caucasian, while the 2011 Latinobarómetro survey shows that some 60% of Chileans consider themselves White.

An estimated 1.6 million (10%) to 3.2 million (20%) Chileans have a surname (one or both) of Basque origin. Many Basques settled in Chile due to its great similarity to their native land: similar geography, cool climate, and the presence of fruits, seafood, and wine.

In many sparsely populated areas of southern Chile, traces of German immigration are quite noticeable. An independent estimate calculates that about 1,000,000 Chileans could descend from German immigrants. Like the Basques, German settlers preferred Chile, especially the south, as they found the climate and geography to be very similar to their homeland. Most German settlers stayed in Valdivia, Llanquihue, Osorno, Chiloé, and Los Ángeles.

Other historically significant immigrant groups included Croats, whose descendants today are estimated at 500,000 persons, or 3.5% of the Chilean population. Some authors claim that close to 4.6% of the Chilean population must have some Croatian ancestry. Over 700,000 Chileans (3.5% of the Chilean population) may have British (English, Scottish or Welsh) and Irish ancestry. Chileans of Greek descent are estimated to number 150,000; most live in or near either Santiago or Antofagasta, and Chile is one of the five countries in the world most populated with descendants of Greeks. The descendants of Swiss immigrants are around 90,000, and estimates suggest that about 5% of the Chilean population has some French ancestry. 600,000 Chileans descend from Italian immigrants. Other groups of Europeans exist but are found in smaller numbers, such as the descendants of Austrians and Dutchmen (estimated at about 150,000).

It is estimated that 4% of the Chilean population is of Middle Eastern origin. There are a large community of Arab Chileans (i.e. Palestinians, Syrians, Lebanese and Middle East Armenians), totaling around 800,000. Israelis, both Jewish and non-Jewish citizens of the nation of Israel may be included.

Chile is home to a large population of immigrants, mostly Christian, from the Levant. Roughly 500,000 Palestinian descendants are believed to reside in Chile. The earliest such migrants came in the 1850s, with others arriving during World War I and later the 1948 Arab-Israeli war. The Club Palestino is one of the most prestigious social clubs in Santiago. They are believed to form the largest Palestinian community outside of the Arab world. Aside from migrants of previous decades, Chile has also taken in some Palestinian refugees in later years, as in April 2008 when they received 117 from the Al-Waleed refugee camp on the Syria-Iraq border near the Al-Tanf crossing. The situation in Gaza has caused tensions between the Israeli and Palestinian communities in Chile.

== See also ==
- Chileans
- Culture of Chile
- European diaspora
- Arab diaspora
- History of colonialism
- Viceroyalty of Peru
- Colonial caste system

=== Immigrant communities in Chile ===
- Basque Chileans
- Spanish Chileans
- French Chileans
- Arab Chileans
- British Chileans (English · Irish · Scots)
- Italian Chileans
- German Chileans
- Croatian Chileans
- Polish Chileans
- Greek Chileans
- Swiss Chileans
- Dutch Chileans
- Hungarian Chileans
- Russian Chileans
