= Chileans =

Ethnic group and nation native to Chile

Chilenos (Spanish)
- Map of the Chilean diaspora

Total population
- 19,212,362^{[a]}

Regions with significant populations
- Chile 18,175,016
- Total diaspora: 1,037,346
- Argentina: 439,582
- United States: 226,993
- Spain: 106,060
- Sweden: 56,138
- Canada: 45,190
- Australia: 37,608
- France: 30,325
- Brazil: 26,039
- Venezuela: 23,296
- Germany: 19,702
- Peru: 11,313
- Norway: 10,083
- United Kingdom: 9,000
- Portugal: 8,400
- Mexico: 6,404
- Netherlands: 4,413
- Italy: 3,199
- New Zealand: 2,959
- Denmark: 2,522
- Japan: 1,249
- South Africa: 1,000
- Other countries combined: 125,324

Languages
- Chilean Spanish, Indigenous languages

Religion
- Predominantly Christian: (Catholic (55%); Evangelical (16%)); Minority irreligious or unaffiliated (25%); Mapuche religion

Related ethnic groups
- Chilean Americans; indigenous peoples in Chile; Basques; Europeans
- a. As of 31 December 2019. Based on the projected population of Chile as of 31 December 2019 (19,283,722) minus the non-Chilean population living in Chile as of 31 December 2019 (1,492,522) plus the Chilean population living abroad as of 2016 (1,037,346).

Chileans (Spanish: Chilenos, pronounced [tʃiˈlenos]) are an ethnic group and nation native to the country of Chile and its neighboring insular territories. Most Chileans share a common culture, history, ancestry and language. The overwhelming majority of Chileans are the product of varying degrees of admixture between white ethnic groups (predominantly Basques and Spaniards) with peoples indigenous to Chile's modern territory.

The overwhelming majority of Chileans have Spanish as their first language and either are Christians (mainly Catholic) or have a Christian cultural background, although the country is also home to Indigenous peoples with distinct cultural and linguistic traditions. There is also a substantial irreligious minority.

However, many Chileans do not equate their nationality with ethnicity, but with citizenship and allegiance to Chile. This has resulted due to immigration to Chile throughout its history, and thus the term "Chilean" can now also include people identifying with the country whose connection may not be ethnic, but cultural, historical, legal, or residential. For most modern Chileans, several or all of these connections exist and are collectively the source of their Chilean identity.

There is a strong correlation between the ratio of a Chilean's European and indigenous genetic components and their socioeconomic situation. There is a marked continuum existing between the lower classes of a high component of indigenous ancestry and the upper classes of a predominant component of European ancestry. Indigenous inheritance, whether cultural or genetic, is most pronounced in rural areas and in aspects of culture such as Chilean cuisine and Chilean Spanish. Although post-independence immigrants never made up more than 2% of the population, there are now hundreds of thousands of Chileans with German, British, French, Croatian, Italian or Palestinian ancestry, though these have also been mostly mixed with other groups within the country.

Though the majority of Chileans reside in Chile, significant communities have been established in multiple countries, most noticeably Argentina, United States, Australia and Canada and countries of the European Union. Although small in number, Chilean people also make up a substantial part of the permanent population of Antarctica and the Falkland Islands (see: Chileans in the Falkland Islands).

== Ethnic structure ==
As in other Latin American countries, in Chile, from the onset of Spanish colonization and settlement, miscegenation or mestizaje was the norm rather than the exception. Today, ethnic and racial self-identities are highly fluid and can differ between persons of the same family, including siblings of the same parentage. It is dictated not only by strict physical appearance, nor more loosely by ancestry (actual or presumed), but by cultural patterns, social class, wealth and access, language, and prevailing biases of the era. These very factors, indeed, lend to the significantly varying ethnic structure figures from one source to the next. Additionally, those various figures refer to different, even if often overlapping, concepts: including racial vs ethnic categories, self-identity vs genetic findings, as well as culturally assigned categories. These concepts should not be confused, and the figures represented in one source might not be corresponding to figures of concepts from another source.

Thus, for instance, UNAM professor of Latin American studies, Francisco Lizcano, in his social research estimates that a predominant 52.7% of the Chilean population can be classified as European, with an estimated 44% as Mestizo. Other social studies put the total amount of Whites at over 60 percent.

According to a 2012 estimate by the US Central Intelligence Agency (CIA) World Factbook, the population consists of 88.9% of "White and non-Indigenous", with the remaining percentages being Amerindians, except for a 0.3% "unspecified".

Some publications state that the entire population consist of a combined 95.4% of "Whites and White-Amerindians", and 4.6% of indigenous peoples. These figures are based on a national census held in 2002, which classified the population as indigenous and non-indigenous, rather than as White or Mestizo.

Despite this, a Chilean researcher in 2015 stated that "there are no Chileans without Amerindian or European ancestry".

=== Ancestries and genetics ===
General genetic ancestries

== Genetics ==
Genetic ancestry of self-identified White Chileans according to the Candela Project (2014).
1. European (54.0%)
2. Indigenous (44.0%)
3. African (2.00%)

According to a genetic study published in PLOS Genetics in 2014, 37.9% of the Chilean participants self-identified as "White". DNA admixture testing revealed that the individuals within this self-identified White cohort possessed an average genetic makeup of 54% European, 44% Indigenous, and 2% African ancestry.

- 67.9% European; 32.1% Indigenous; (Valenzuela, 1984): Marco de referencia sociogenético para los estudios de salud pública en Chile, fuente: Revista Chilena de Pediatría.
- 64.0% European; 35.0% Indigenous; (Cruz-Coke, 1994): Genetic epidemiology of single gene defects in Chile, fuente: Universidad de Chile.
- 57.2% European; 38.7% Indigenous; 2.5% African; 1.7% Asian; (Homburger et al., 2015): Genomic Insights into the Ancestry and Demographic History of South America, fuente: PLOS ONE Genetics.
- An autosomal DNA study from 2014 found Chile to possess a genepool averaging 51.85% (± 5.44%) European, 44.34% (± 3.9%) Indigenous, and 3.81% (± 0.45%) African DNA. The genetic study was conducted across all regions of Chile, and while it "ratified the preponderance of mestizaje in Chile", it also found "the indigenous presence is marked by a curve in the Chilean territory. In the north, between Arica and Coquimbo, and in the south, between La Araucanía and Aysén, the genes of indigenous Amerindians exceeds 50%. Only in the central region and the far south does the European component surpass [the Amerindian component]." However, the majority of Chile's population is concentrated in the central regions of the country.

Others genetics topics

Cities with a historically higher proportion of European immigration, such as Concepción, in south central Chile, exhibited an average middle class genepool of 75% European and 25% Indigenous DNA, while in Valparaíso the average middle class genepool was 77% European and 23% Indigenous DNA. By contrast, in southern and northern regions of the country, the Indigenous component surpassed the European component.

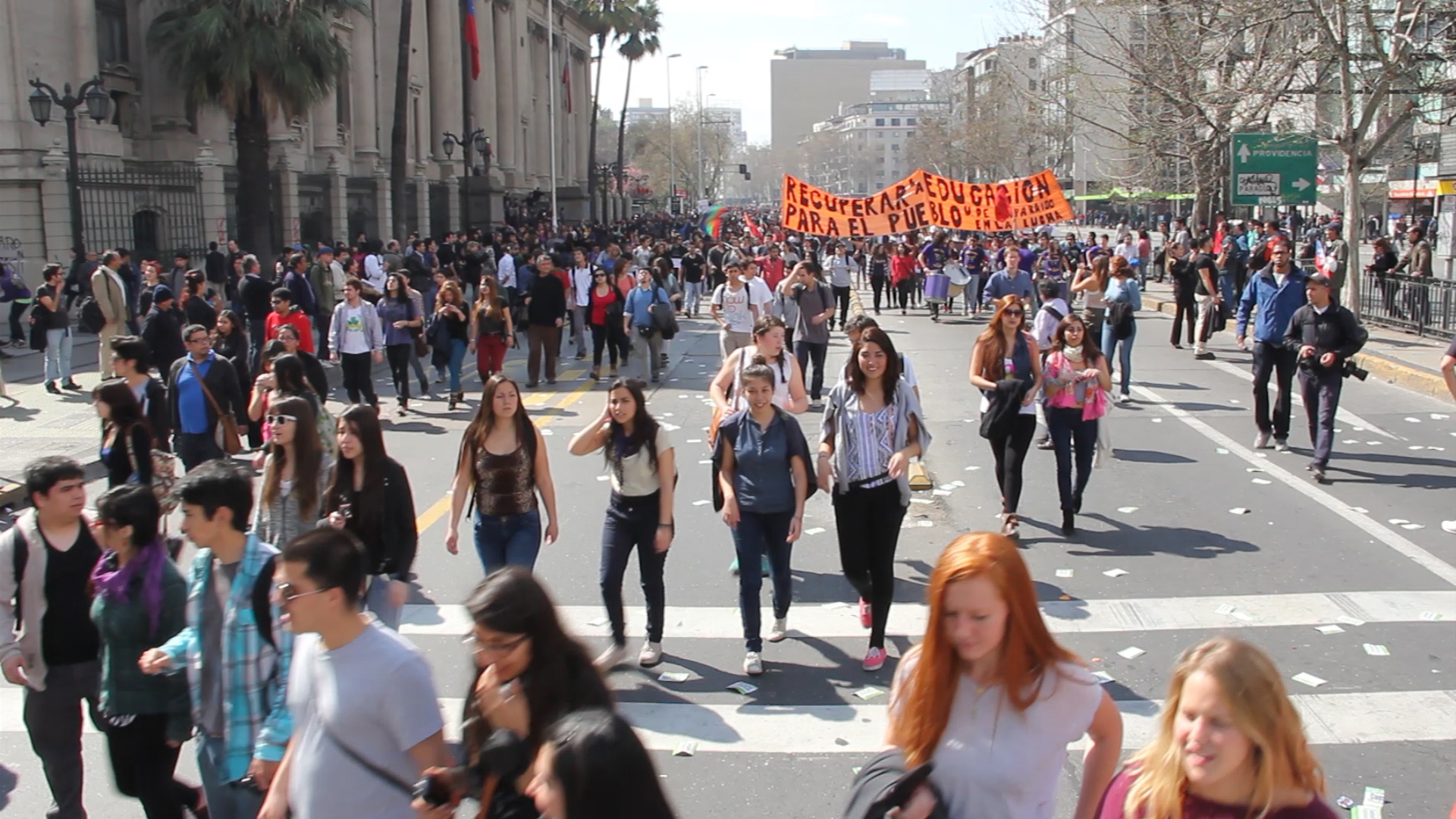
Chilean students in Santiago de Chile

Related genetic studies conducted on Santiago's mtDNA and Y-DNA found a sex bias in the ethnic origin of those sex-specific chromosomes. Thus, across all social classes, an overwhelming 84% of Santiago's mitochondrial DNA (inherited only from mother to child) is of Indigenous origin, while the Y chromosome (inherited only from father to son) is about 70% of European origin, and between 6% and 15% Indigenous, depending on the area of the city. The results indicate a gender asymmetrical pattern of sexual relations leading to childbirth in Chile's history.

On a genotypic (genetic) level, however, persons in all groups, despite their classification by phenotype (appearance) would nonetheless contain admixture, not just those with stereotypically mestizo appearance. Thus, in Chile, the three groups, the phenotypically "white," "mestizo," and "indigenous," would represent a genetic continuum rather than isolated groups, including the presence of some Indigenous DNA in Chileans who appear more European and some European DNA in Chileans who appear more Indigenous.

=== Racial self-perceptions ===
Ethnic groups in Chile (Self-identification in the 2024 census)
1. Undeclared (Mostly White or Mestizo) (87.7%)
2. Indigenous (11.4%)
3. Blacks (0.94%)

In a 2011 Latinobarómetro survey which asked respondents in Chile what race they considered themselves to belong to, a majority of 67% answered "white", while 25% said "mestizo", and 8% self-classified as "indigenous".

A 2002 national poll revealed that a slim majority of 51.7% of Chileans stated that they believed that they possessed "indigenous blood". Some 43.4% of respondents said that they believed they had "some" Amerindian ancestry and another 8.3% believed they had "much" Amerindian ancestry, but 40.3% responded that they believed that they had no Amerindian ancestry. Despite a majority of Chileans acknowledging that they had at least some Amerindian ancestry, if asked, many Chileans would simply self-identify as white.

As of 2017, according to Encyclopædia Britannica, about 88% of Chileans were white or mestizo, and 12% were indigenous.

== Ethnographic history of Chile ==
=== Spaniards, Mestizos and Indigenous Peoples ===
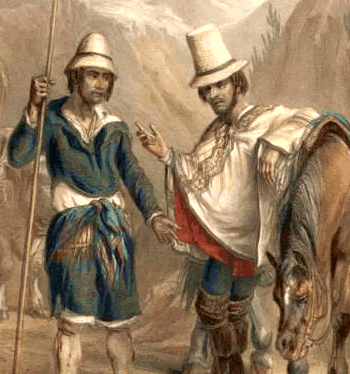
Rural population in the 19th century by Claudio Gay

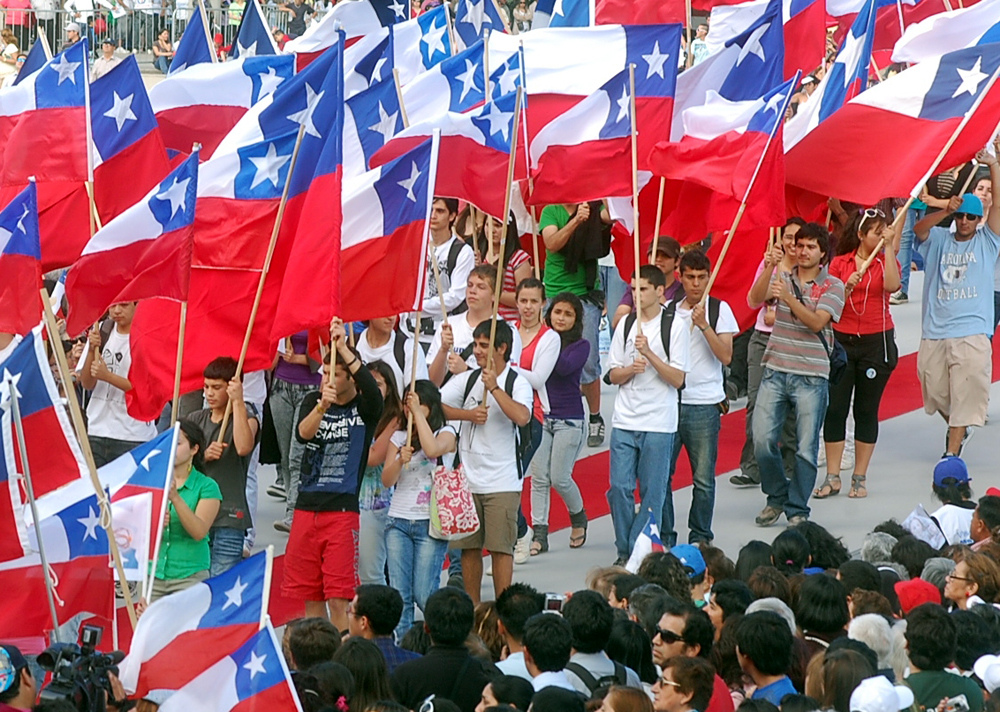
Chileans carrying flags in the National Sanctuary of Maipú

For at least 12,000 years, numerous indigenous peoples settled in central and southern Chile. The predominant Mapuche made up the overwhelming majority the population up until the Spanish conquest. During the colonial period, troops were sent out to the Americas by the Spanish Crown in order to protect distant colonies. Spanish folk immigrated from all regions of Spain, particularly Andalusia, Extremadura, Basque Country, Asturias, Navarra and Castile. Of the Spanish, many immigrants ultimately settled in Chile after the Mapuche resistance to the conquest.

The indigenous Picunche population of Central Chile disappeared by a process of mestizaje by gradually abandoning their villages (pueblo de indios) to settle in nearby Spanish haciendas. There Picunches mingled with disparate indigenous peoples brought in from: Araucanía (Mapuche), Chiloé (Huilliche, Cunco, Chono, Poyas) and Argentina (Huarpe). Few in numbers, disconnected from their ancestral lands and diluted by mestizaje the Picunche and their descendants lost their indigenous identity.

The government of Agustín de Jáuregui, which ruled around 1777–1778, ordered the first general population census. The census confirmed a total of 259,646 inhabitants at the time, with 73.5% classified as Caucasian, 9.8% as African, 8.6% as Indian, and 7.8% as Mestizo. In 1784, Francisco Hurtado, governor of the province of Chiloé, conducted a population census in Chiloe that totaled 26,703 inhabitants, of which about 64.4% was classified as españoles ("Spaniards", Caucasian and mixed Mestizo people) and 33.5% considered indios ("Indians"). First generation mestizos sprang largely from the intercourse of Spanish men and indigenous women. The opposite, the union of indigenous men and Spanish women was rare but not unheard of.

In 1812, the Diocese of Concepción conducted a census to the south of the Maule river; however, this did not include the indigenous population — at that time estimated at 8,000 people — nor the inhabitants of the province of Chiloé. It put the total population at 210,567, of which 86.1% was native Spaniards and 10% were Indian, with a remaining 3.7% of African, mulattos, and mestizo descent. Other estimates in the late 17th century indicate that the population reached a maximum total of 152,000, consisting of 72% whites and mestizos, 18% Indians, and 10% blacks and mulattos.

For many years, Spanish-descent settlers and religious orders imported African slaves to the country, which in the early 19th century constituted 1.5% of the national population. Despite this, the Afro-Chilean population was small, reaching a height of only 2,500 — or 0.1% of the total population — during the colonial period. The birth rates of black people were low. According to Sergio Villalobos this could have been indebted to the fact that black women and men were often apart as result of their slave labor and an hesitancy of other racial groups to engage with them.

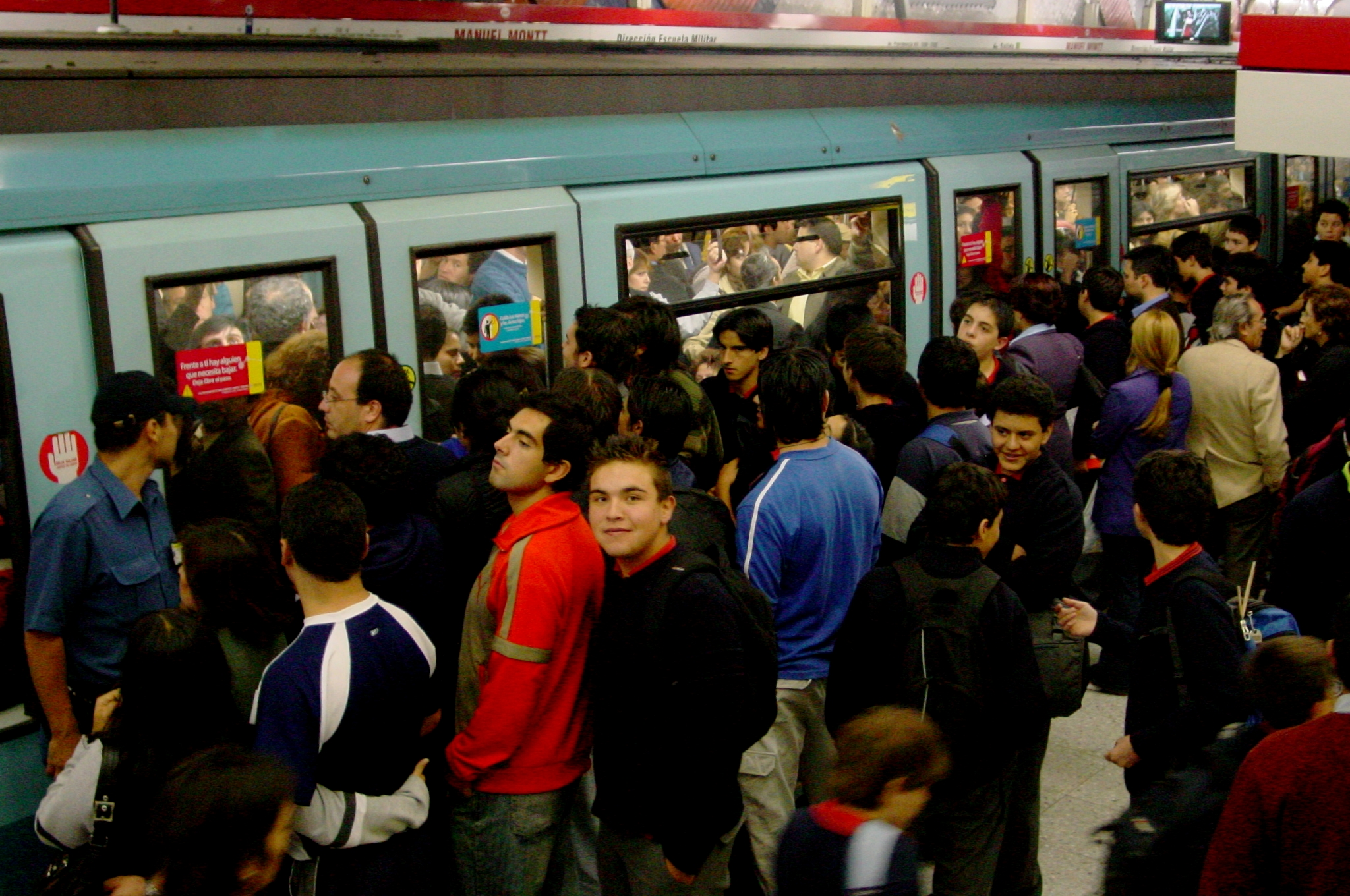
Chileans in the metro in Santiago de Chile

In the 18th century, many Spanish civilians (mainly of Basque origin) entered the country, in particular attracted by trade liberalization at the time enacted by the Spanish Crown. In the late 18th century, Basque descendants were estimated to comprise 27% of the total population. Most of the Basque immigrants initially partook in small businesses, though others attained higher levels of prosperity. Of those, many mixed with the Criollo aristocracy of Castilian origin, who owned much of the land. This resulted in the Castilian-Basque aristocracy, which later came to form the basis of the Chilean ruling class; other Basques also integrated with mestizo population of Castilian origin, that resulted in modern Chilean middle classes. The number of descendants from Basques in Chile are estimated at 10% of the population (1.7 million).

=== European and neighboring immigrants ===
After Chile's independence successive waves of Spanish, Italians, Irish, French, Greeks, Germans, Austrians, British, Dutch, Croats, Russians, Poles, Hungarians, Portuguese and Middle Eastern people immigrated to the country.

A substantial German immigration took place in 1848, laying the foundation for the German-Chilean community. Under a government sponsored program aimed at colonizing the southern region, the Germans (including German-speaking Swiss, Silesians, Alsatians, Austrians, and Sudeten Germans), colonized the south and have since influenced the cultural and racial composition of the southern provinces of Chile. It is estimated that 150,000 to 200,000 Chileans could have German ancestors.

About 700,000 Chileans, or 5% of Chile's population, have Arab ancestry. Of these 500,000 are Palestinian descendants.

Other historically significant immigrant groups include: Croatians, whose numbers today are estimated at 380,000 persons, about 2.4% of the population. 4.6% of the Chilean population has some Croatian ancestry. Over 700,000 Chileans, 4.5% of Chile's population, has British (English, Scottish and Welsh) origin.

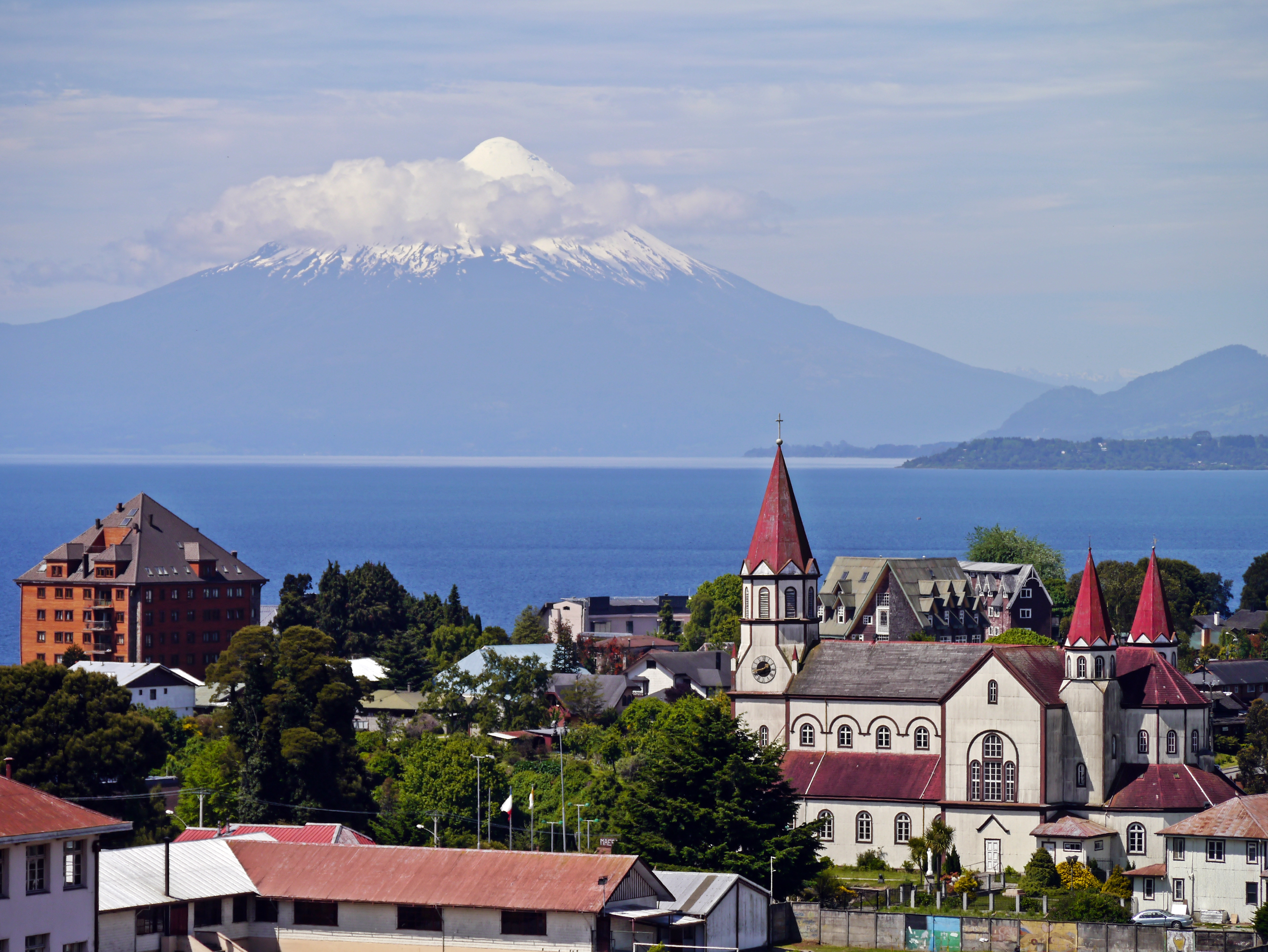
Puerto Varas in southern Chile, shows German influence in its architecture.

Between 90,000 and 120,000 Chileans are of Greek origin. Most live either in the Santiago or Antofagasta areas. Chile is one of the 5 countries with the most Greeks in the world. The number of Swiss is about 90,000. About 5% of the Chilean population has some French ancestry. 600,000 to 800,000 are Italians. Other European groups are found in smaller numbers.

In 1903, a fleet of 88 Canarian families—400 persons—arrived in Budi Lake, Chile, that currently have more than 1,000 descendants, as a response to the government's call to populate this region and signed contracts for the benefit of a private company. While many Canarians obeyed their service, some of those who disobeyed the provisions of repopulation tried to escape their service and were arrested, and the indigenous Mapuche people took pity on the plight of these Canarians who were established on their former lands. The Mapuches welcomed them and joined their demonstrations in the so-called "revolt of the Canarians", and many Canarians integrated into Mapuche population to add the large mestizo population that exists in Chile.

The European immigrants have transformed the country culturally, economically and politically. European emigration in Chile and to a lesser extent, the arrival from the Middle East during the second half of the 19th and 20th centuries, was the most important in Latin America second to that which occurred in the Atlantic Coast of the Southern Cone (i.e., Argentina and southern Brazil).

These European ethnic groups have intermarried thereby diluting the distinct cultures, descent and identities of the home countries and fusing them among each other. These intermixed cultures form the society and culture of the Chilean middle and upper classes. The European have still preserved elements of themselves, therefore they enjoy the original European cultural practices such as the British afternoon tea and biscuits, French casseroles and coffee, German cakes and sausage, and Italian pasta and mineral waters. The cultural influences can also be seen in the architecture of the cities. The Chilean folk culture is not embraced as it is an offshoot of the culture of the Spaniards who settled the country in the colonial period.

=== Latin American immigrants ===
Since 1990, with the end of Augusto Pinochet's dictatorship and the return to democracy, and the subsequent socioeconomic development of the country, a significant number of immigrants from various Latin American countries started to arrive to Chile. These represented nearly 1,200,000 people (2017) corresponding to 7% of the population residing in the country. They were composed of 288,233 Venezuelans, 223,923 Peruvians, 179,338 Haitians, 146,582 Colombians, 107,346 Bolivians, 74,713 Argentines, 36,994 Ecuadorians, 18,185 Brazilians, 17,959 Dominicans, 15,837 Cubans and 8,975 Mexicans.

This has prompted a change in the physiognomy of certain boroughs ("communes") in the country where its number is concentrated. In boroughs such as Santiago Centro and Independencia, a third of all residents (28% and 31% respectively) were born abroad. Other communes of Greater Santiago with high numbers of immigrants are Estación Central (17%) and Recoleta (16%). In the northern regions such as Antofagasta Region, 17.3% of the population is a Latin American foreigner, with communes such as Ollagüe (31%), Mejillones (16%), Sierra Gorda (16%) and Antofagasta (11%), with high percentages of Latin American immigrants, mainly Bolivians, Colombians and Peruvians.

== Indigenous Chileans ==
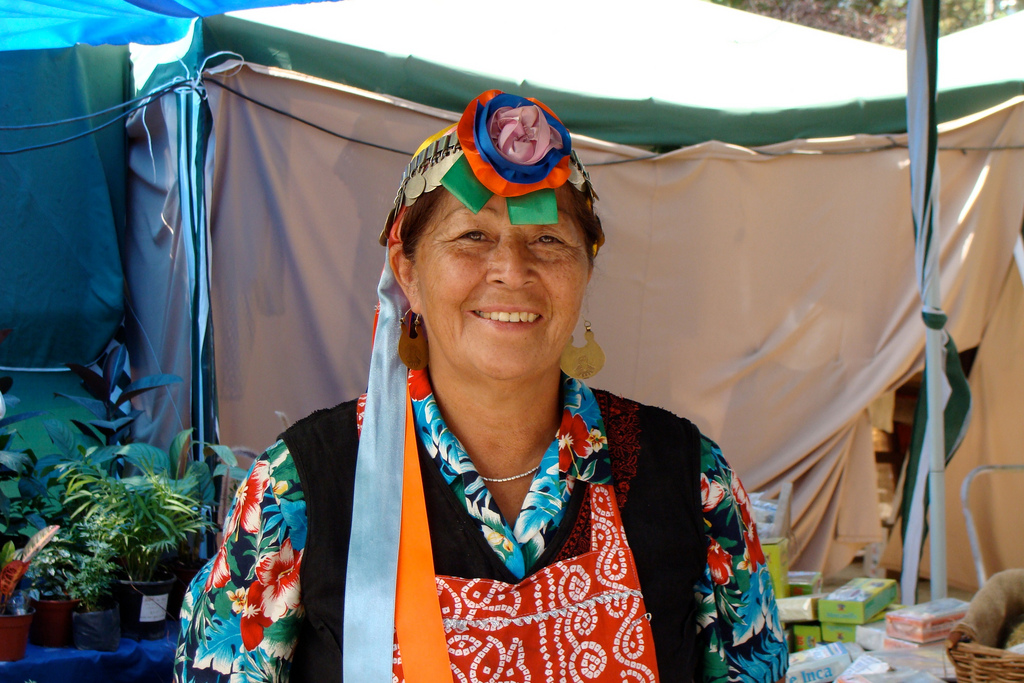
Mapuche woman in traditional dress.

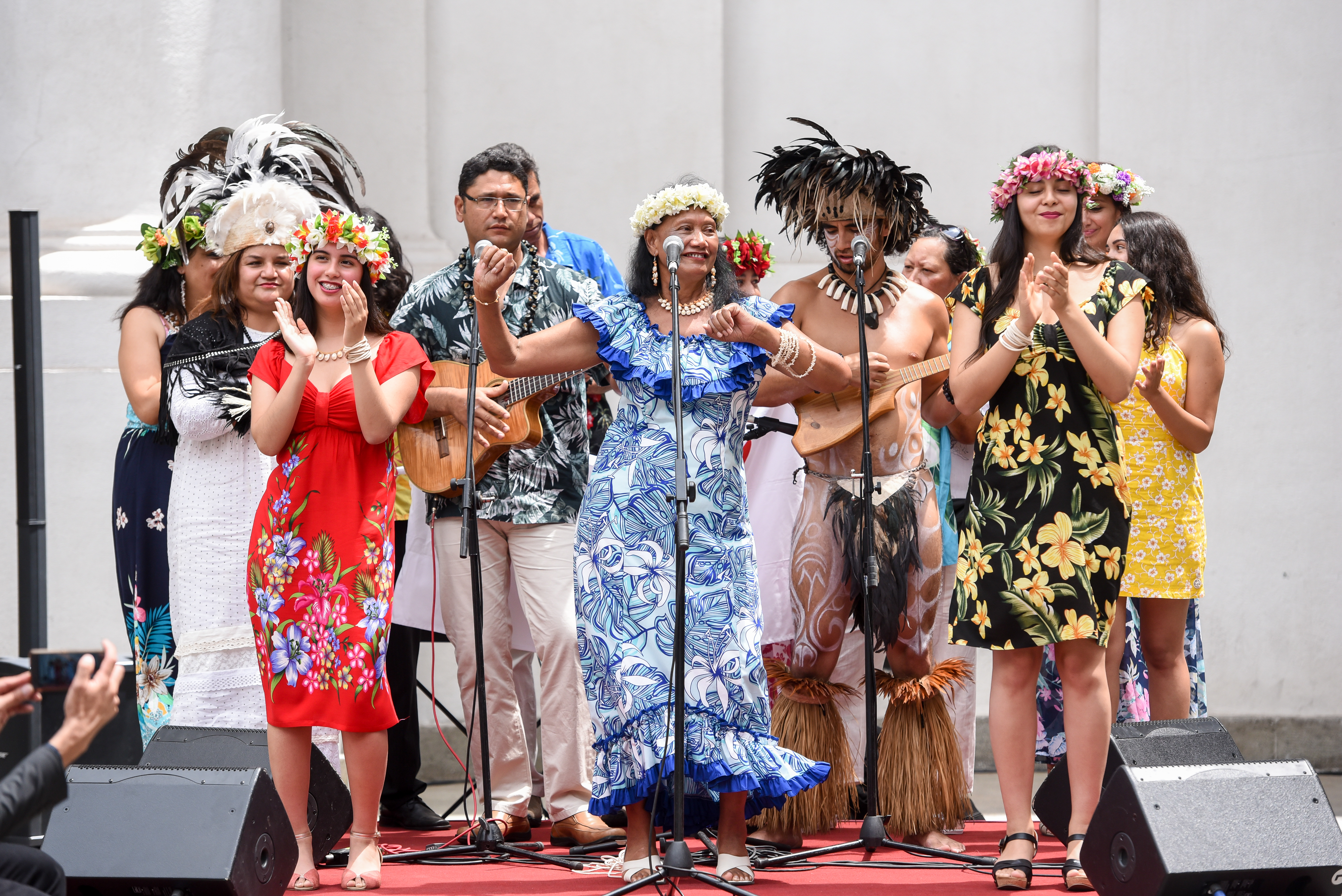
Rapa Nui people

With the independence of Chile in the 1810s, Mapuche began to be seen as Chileans by other Chileans, contrasting with previous perceptions of them as a separate people or nation.

Although indigenous peoples like Mapuche and Aymaras are in some situations contrasted against Chilean people the two demonyms are not mutually exclusive and are rather often used in combination. For example, "a Chilean Aymara" can be used to contrast with Aymaras living in Bolivia or Peru.

The 1907 census reported 101,118 Indians, or 3.1% of the total country population. Only those that practiced their native culture or spoke their native language were considered, irrespective of their "racial purity."

At the 2024 census, people that declared themselves as indigenous amounted to 11.5% of the population (2,105,863 people); of these, 77.2% declared themselves Mapuche. as with Chileans of other backgrounds most Mapuche show varying degrees of mixed ancestry.

Some native peoples of Chile disappeared product from acculturation and miscegenation, as is the case of peoples Picunches, Diaguitas and Chonos, whereas a large number of Selkʼnam or Onas disappeared by the extermination carried out by settlers in Tierra del Fuego in the early 20th century. Other factors that contributed to their extinction were diseases brought by Europeans, such as smallpox.

According to the 2017 census, 12.8% of the Chilean population, 1 842 607 people of 14 years or more, declares themselves indigenous. Of the total indigenous population, 79.8% declared themselves Mapuche; 7.2%, Aymara; 4.1%, Diaguita; 1.6%, Quechua; 1.4%, Atacameño; 0.9%, Colla; 0.4%, Rapa Nui; 0.1%, Kawésqar and 0.1%, Yaghan. 1.3% identified with another and 3.1% identified as indigenous but it has not been said which.

== Religion ==
| Religion (Census 2002) | % |
|---|---|
| Catholic | 70% |
| Protestant or Evangelical | 15% |
| Atheist/None or Agnostic | 8% |
| Others | 7% |

| Religion (2015 Survey) | % |
|---|---|
| Catholic | 55% |
| Atheist/None or Agnostic | 25% |
| Protestant or Evangelical | 13% |
| Others | 7% |

== Culture ==
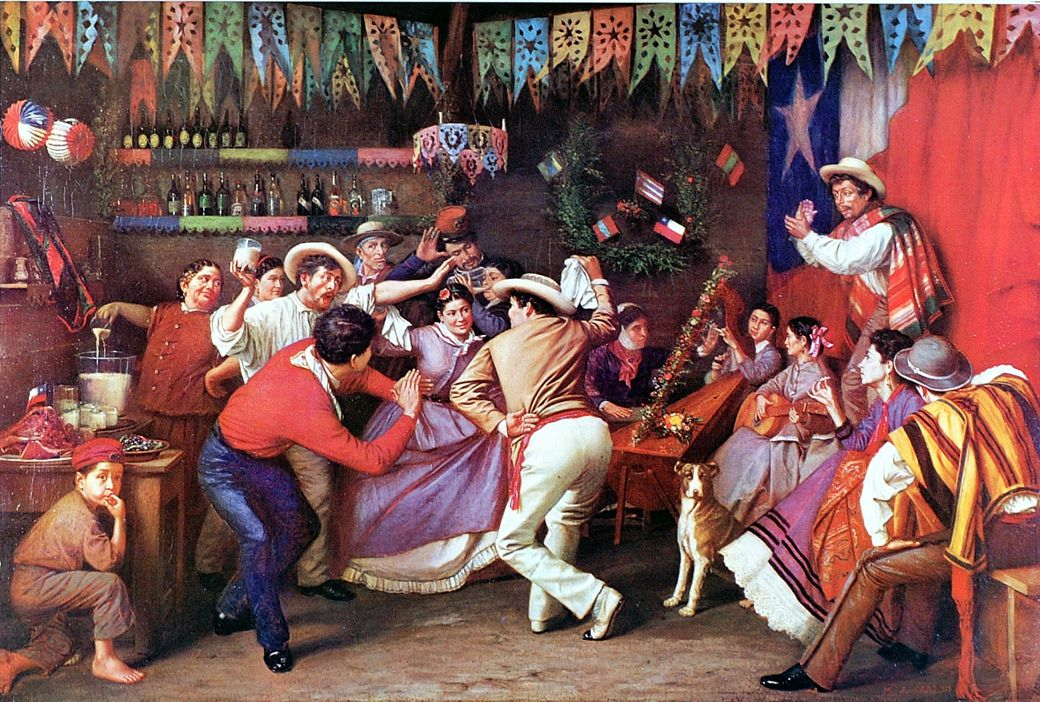
La Zamacueca, 1873, by Manuel Antonio Caro

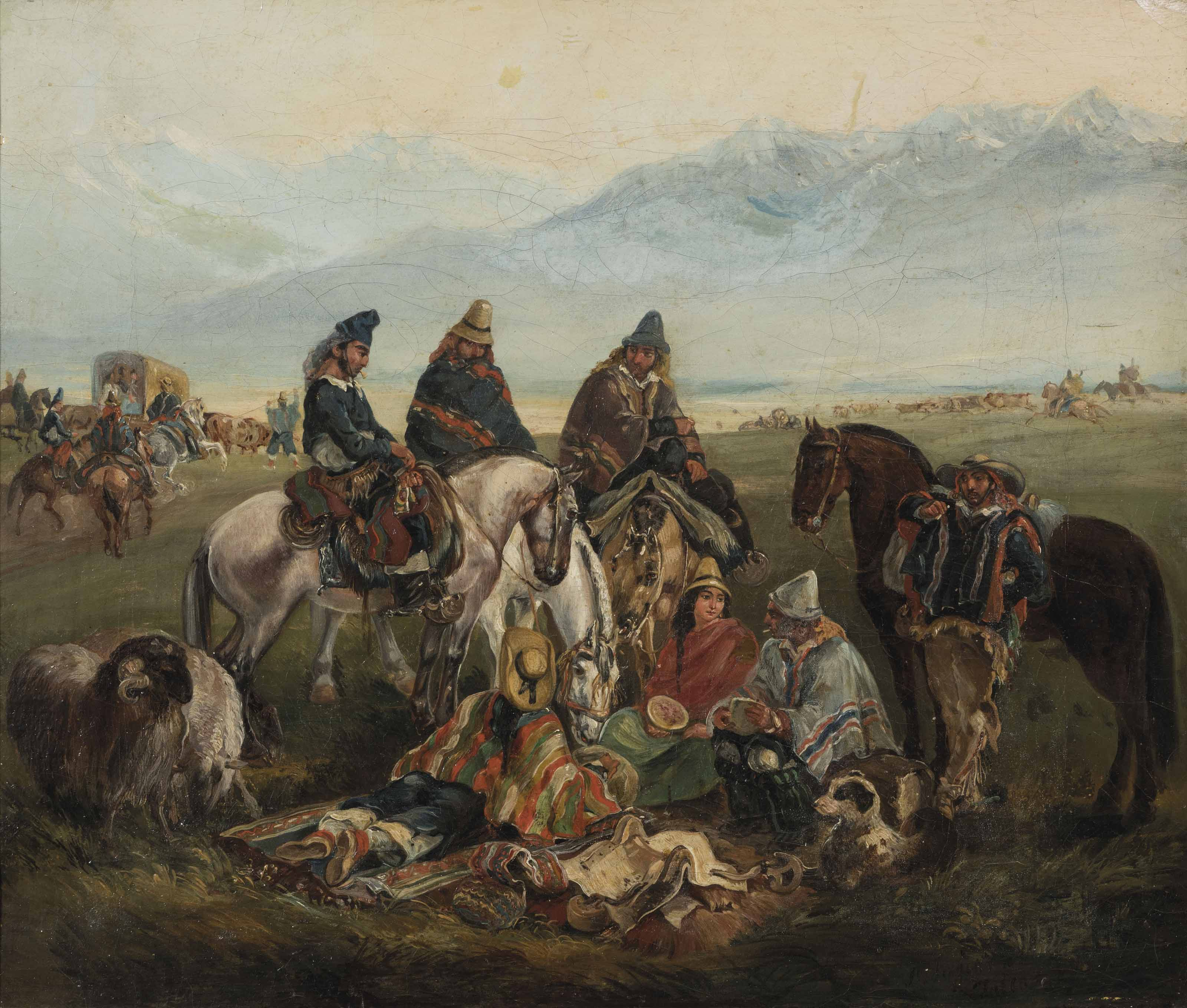
Chilean huasos, 1836, by Johann Moritz Rugendas

The folk culture of Chile has mostly Spanish origins, especially the huaso culture of the central part of the country, as it arose in the colonial period due to cattle ranching. It could therefore be considered an offshoot of Spanish popular culture of the 17th an 18th centuries as are the folk cultures of the rest of Latin America and also, its direct descendants, Andalusian and Castilian folk cultures. The Andalusian forms in the huaso dress is apparent to Europeans and the music and dances show Spanish origins, even though both have been adapted and are distinct from dress, music and dance in Spain today.

The ranches called fundos, where the huasos lived and worked show strong similarity with Spanish vernacular architecture, especially in the canal roofs and the interior courtyards. The fundo is now thought of as traditional Chilean architecture and is associated with the huaso.

As well as the huaso culture of the central part of the country can be seen the German, Chilote, Croatian and Magallanic culture in the south, and the Andean culture in the north.

Chile's Nueva Canción movement in modern Chilean folk culture is adapted from the folk music of the north, not of the brass bands but of the panpipes and quenas. The traditional Chilean folk music of the huasos were also popularized, particularly the tonadas, folk songs sung with a guitar, mainly on the topics of love. Several folk groups who dress in huaso costume became famous nationwide.

The folk culture that is mainly associated with the Chilean national identity is that of the huasos as that is where the Chilean state was formed and it spread northwards and southwards in the late 19th century.

== Emigration of Chileans ==
Emigration of Chileans has decreased during the last decade: It is estimated that 857,781 Chileans live abroad, 50.1% of those being in Argentina (the highest number), 13.3% in the United States, 8.8% in Brazil, 4.9% in Sweden, and around 2% in Australia, with the rest being scattered in smaller numbers across the globe. Other Chilean refugees settled (not ranked by order of size) in Spain, Mexico, Costa Rica, United Kingdom, Canada, France, Germany, New Zealand, and Italy.

Many pro-Allende refugees in the 1970s fled to East Germany, including president Michelle Bachelet, who also lived in Australia. Anti-Pinochet refugees formed a large expatriate community in Europe and a smaller community in North America (the US and Canada). The Chilean-Swedish population is estimated at 56,000 people, a result of migration that began with the political refugees from the 1973 coup d'état.

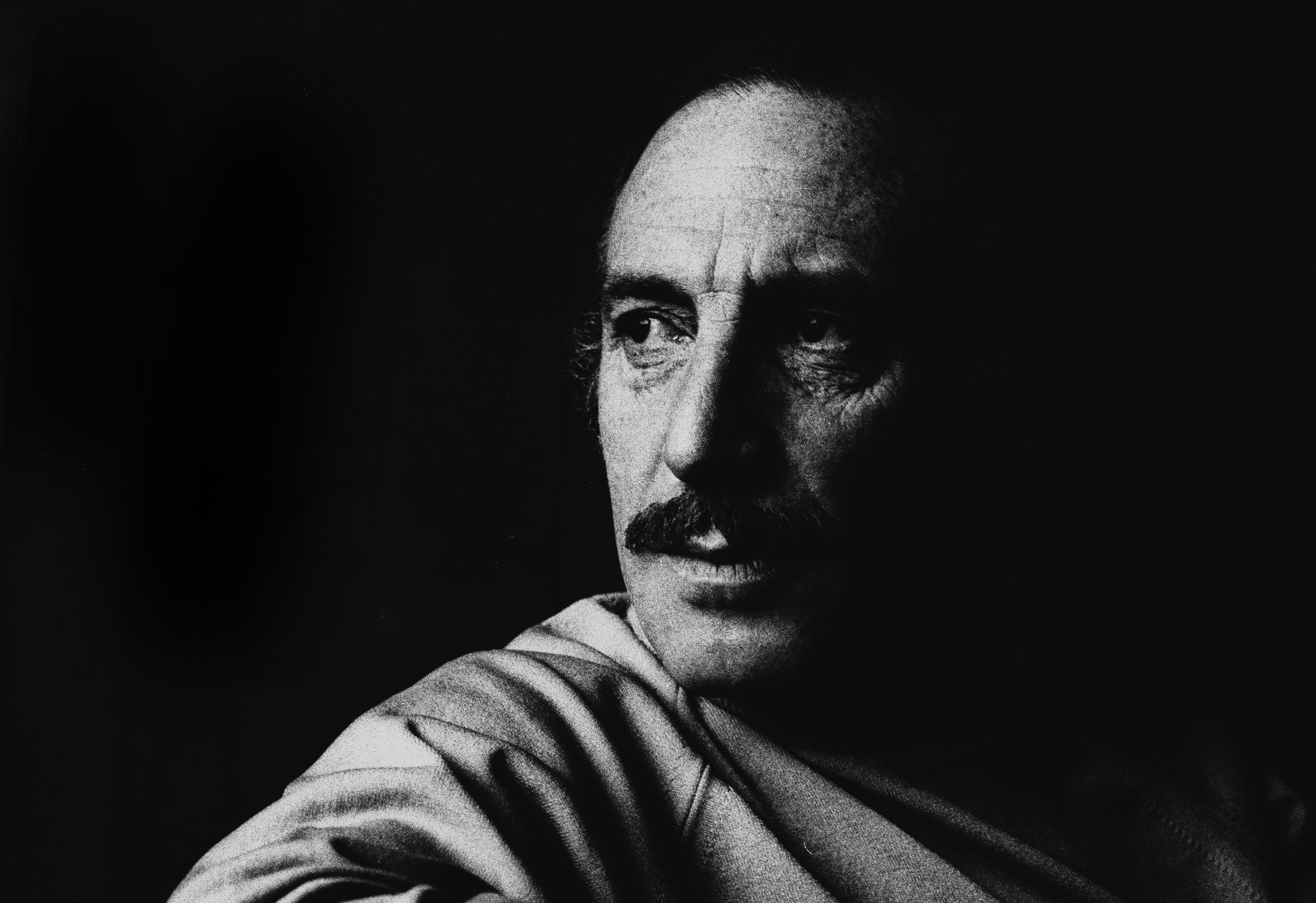
Chilean economist Orlando Letelier was assassinated in Washington, D.C. by Pinochet's secret police in 1976

Over 100,000 Chileans fleeing from both regimes in the 1970s and 1980s settled in the US, a small number compared to other Latino groups. The highest number settled in Miami, Florida, but smaller enclaves are in Washington, D.C.; New York City; and California (the Los Angeles area – Beverly Hills and Long Beach; and San Francisco – San Mateo County).

Approximately 2,500 Chilean exiles fled to the UK in the early 1970s and by most recent estimates, the Chilean British population is in its tens of thousands, and represents a significant proportion of the UK's Latin American community. By far, the largest concentration of Chileans can be found in London with significant other communities being Birmingham, Sheffield and the Manchester–Liverpool Metropolitan area.

Historic emigration took place in the early 19th century when Chilean ranchers went to Mexico after their independence. Thousands of miners from Chile went to California, the U.S. during the 1850s California Gold Rush, as well in other gold rushes in Colorado (1870s) and the Yukon (1890s). Small numbers of Chilean miners also migrated to South Africa and Australia for the same reason.

== See also ==
- Anti-Chilean sentiment
- White Chileans
- Native Chileans
- Black Chileans
- Culture of Chile
- Criollo people
- Chilean American
- Chilean Argentine
- Chilean Australian
- Chilean Brazilian
- Chilean British
- Chilean German
- Chilean Italian
- Chilean Spanish
- Chilean Swedes
- Swiss Chilean
- Chilean Mexicans
- White Latin Americans
