= Old Believers in South America =

Total population
- c. 3,000-5,000 (est.)

Regions with significant populations
- Brazil: 1,100 or 3,000
- Bolivia: 2,000
- Argentina: 20 households
- Uruguay: 20 households

Languages
- Russian; Brazilian Portuguese; Spanish

Related ethnic groups
- Old Believers in North America; Russian Argentines; Russian Brazilians; Russian Chileans; Russian Uruguayans

Old Believers, ethnic Russians who reject the mainstream Russian Orthodox Church due to 17th-century liturgical reforms, have had a presence in South America since 1958. Following the Russian Revolution, many Old Believers in Siberia migrated to northern and western China; they left China for the Americas after the Chinese communists came into power. There are Old Believer communities in Brazil, Bolivia, Argentina, Uruguay, Paraguay, and Chile. Old Believers are traditionally farmers, and live in rural villages. They avoid interaction with outsiders and believe in self-sufficiency. Although many of them speak Spanish or Brazilian Portuguese, they maintain Russian as the native language.

== History ==
Old Believers, a group which disassociated from the main Russian Orthodox Church in protest of the liturgical reforms under Patriarch Nikon of Moscow in the 17th century, were subject to persecution in the Russian Empire. The Old Believers who would later migrate to South America were originally from Kerzhenets area. By the early 20th century, many Old Believers were living in the Russian Far East, particularly in Amur Oblast and Primorsky Krai. The Russian Revolution, Civil War, and subsequent collectivization initiatives resulted in Old Believers migrating to Manchuria, especially Harbin, as well as Xinjiang. When the communists came to power in China in 1949 and instituted collectivization policies, the Old Believers began emigrating via Hong Kong; many of them went to South America. This migration was aided by the United Nations, International Red Cross, World Council of Churches, Tolstoy Fund, and national governments. Charitable organizations and other religious groups, especially the Molokans, gave them gifts and provided assistance. The Old Believer communities in Xinjiang and Manchuria were not aware of each other until the migration to South America. A meeting of elders from both communities was held in Argentina, where it was determined that they had no major doctrinal differences and could therefore intermarry.

The first group of Old Believers in South America arrived in Brazil in 1958. (Note: Paraguay had issued a group visa to 820 Old Believers in 1953, but bureaucracy prevented the migration to Paraguay from being realized, and the visas expired.) The Brazilian government accepted 240 Old Believer families from 1958–1962, and the Argentinian government accepted 64 families from 1961–1963. From Brazil and Argentina, Old Believers migrated to Uruguay in 1967, Bolivia in the early 1980s, and Chile in the early 1990s.

Old Believers have come into conflict with authorities in multiple countries. Shortly after arriving in Bolivia from Brazil, local law enforcement arrested all male Old Believers, believing them to be partisans. During the civic-military dictatorship of Uruguay (1973–1985), men were required to shave their beards to take passport photos. Old Believers, who do not shave their facial hair, were able to obtain an exception. More recently, the presidency of Evo Morales brought the Old Believers into conflict with the Bolivian government, particularly over the policy of land redistribution back to indigenous communities.

=== Return to Russia ===
Beginning in 2009, some Old Believers in South America have migrated back to Russia. The Russian government's Resettlement of Compatriots Program, created in 2006 by Vladimir Putin, has resettled Old Believers in Primorsky Krai. As of 2020, the number of resettled Old Believers in the Russian Far East was 133; around 100 live in the village of Dersu. Others live in Lyubitovka. Alongside the Resettlement of Compatriots Program, the Russian Ministry of Foreign Affairs has sent representatives to meet with Old Believer communities and organized "compatriot" conferences for the purpose of facilitating migration.

== Demographics and geography ==
The linguist Olga Rovnova estimated that the total number of Old Believers in South America is around 4,000. The largest group of Old Believers in South America live in Brazil, specifically the states of Paraná, Goiás, São Paulo, Mato Grosso, and Mato Grosso do Sul. The population of Old Believers in Brazil is estimated at 1,100 by D. V. Belov, and 3,000 by Galina Petrova. According to another estimate, the largest Old Believer community in South America is in Bolivia, at around 2,000. Some Old Believer families living in a large settlement on the Brazilian bank of the Paraguay River have settled on the Paraguayan bank, living unofficially in Paraguay while holding Brazilian passports.

There are around 20 Old Believer households in Argentina, living on farmsteads near Choele Choel in Río Negro Province.

In Uruguay around 15 Old Believer households live in the settlement of Colonia Ofir in the Río Negro Department, and five households live in the settlement of La Pitanga, near Guichón in the Paysandú Department. Initially, Brazilian Old Believers had settled in the vicinity of a Khlysty village on the outskirts of San Javier, but soon became disillusioned with the Khlysty and founded Ofir and La Pitanga. San Javier houses a significant ethnic Russian population, although the San Javier Russian community originates from Voronezh.

Most Old Believers in Bolivia live in the Santa Cruz Department, in the settlements of Toborochi and Esperanza, as well as the cities of Santa Cruz de la Sierra and Ascensión de Guarayos. Some other Old Believers live in the Cochabamba, Beni, and La Paz departments. Old Believers make up around two thirds of Russophones in Bolivia.

Old Believers from Bolivia migrated to Chile in the early 1990s, settling in the vicinity of Futrono, however no Old Believer families remain in Futrono. A few Old Believer households live in the Santiago area.

== Culture ==
Old Believers maintain an isolated and rural lifestyle and preserve traditional culture, living on farmsteads in their own villages. They are patriarchal, with men being the heads of household and breadwinners and women taking care of children and the home. Marriage with outsiders is prohibited unless the person converts, although it is common for couples to be from Old Believer communities in different countries. Old Believers prefer self-sufficiency, and avoid buying food from stores, going to restaurants, and borrowing money from banks. They generally do not watch television, but use the internet for communication.

Women engage in needlework and other crafts, particularly weaving, embroidery, lacemaking, braiding waist belts, and fabric painting. Old Believers wear traditional Russian clothing, including sarafans, headscarves and caps, embroidered shirts, and the obligatory waist belt. Men are bearded.

=== Religion ===
The Old Believers of South America are priestless and worship on Saturdays and holy days in prayer houses.

=== Economy ===
Old Believers are traditionally farmers, and have found success at integrating into South American economic life and use advanced agricultural machinery. In Brazil, Bolivia, and Uruguay, they grow soy and corn, and in Argentina they grow fruit and vegetables. They also farm cattle and engage in fishing. According to D. V. Belov, Brazil is the only country where Old Believers hold large amounts of land and engage in large-scale agriculture.

=== Education ===
Old Believer children generally attend local public schools where required by law. Children are taught Russian within the family and at community classes. Uruguayan Old Believers, who are considered particularly strict, are an exception and do not send their children to local schools.

== Language ==
Old Believers speak dialects of Russian; due to their traditional rural lifestyle and isolation from the Russian literary standard, they preserve archaic elements of the Russian language which have disappeared in other communities. The dialect spoken by South American Old Believers has developed independently of other forms of the Russian language, and incorporates some lexemes from Spanish and Portuguese. Most Old Believers speak the language of their adopted country (Spanish or Brazilian Portuguese), with varying degrees of fluency, in order to communicate with outside society. However, Russian is spoken as the daily language.
