= Chile–Russia relations =

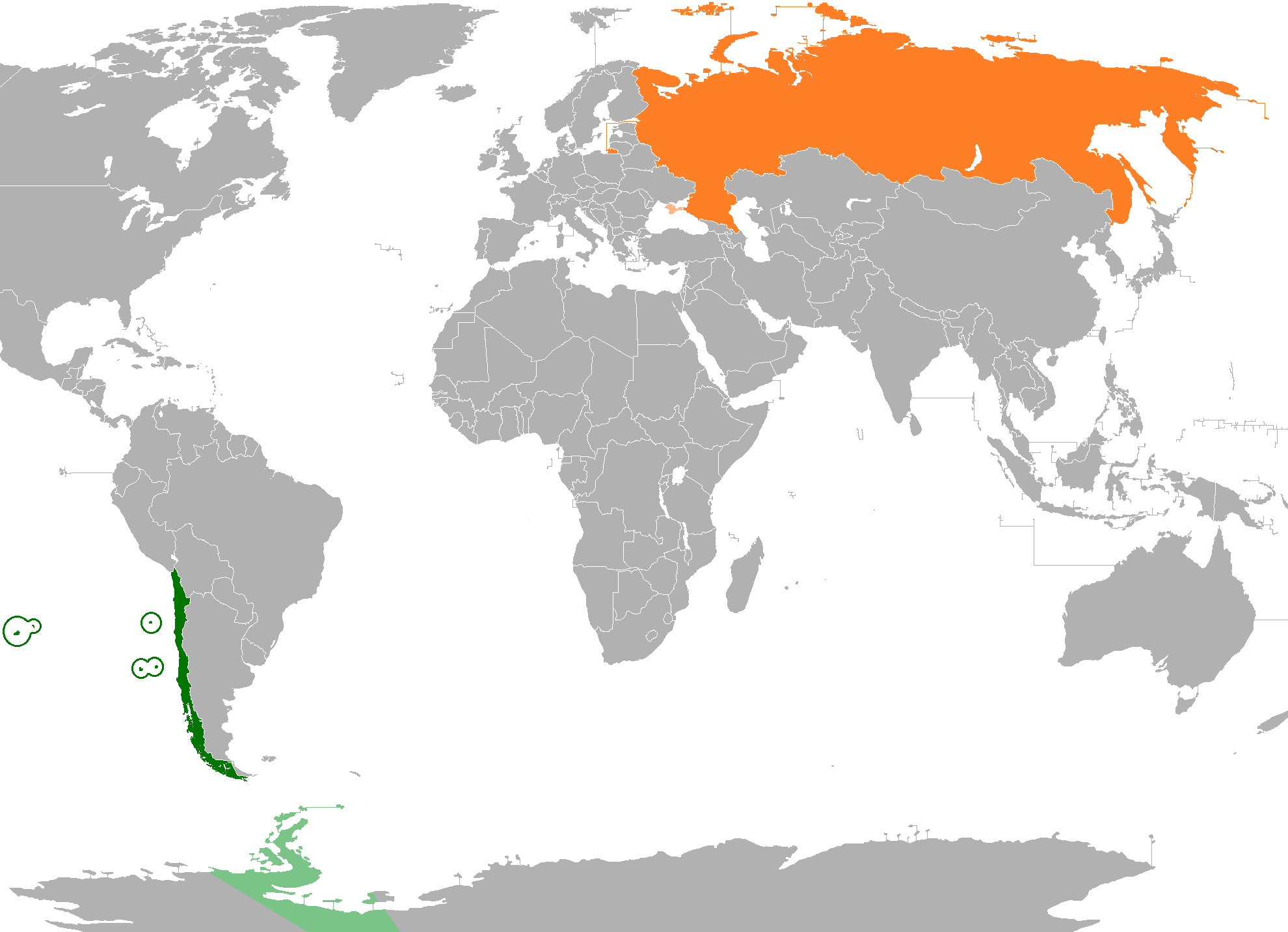
- Chile: Russia

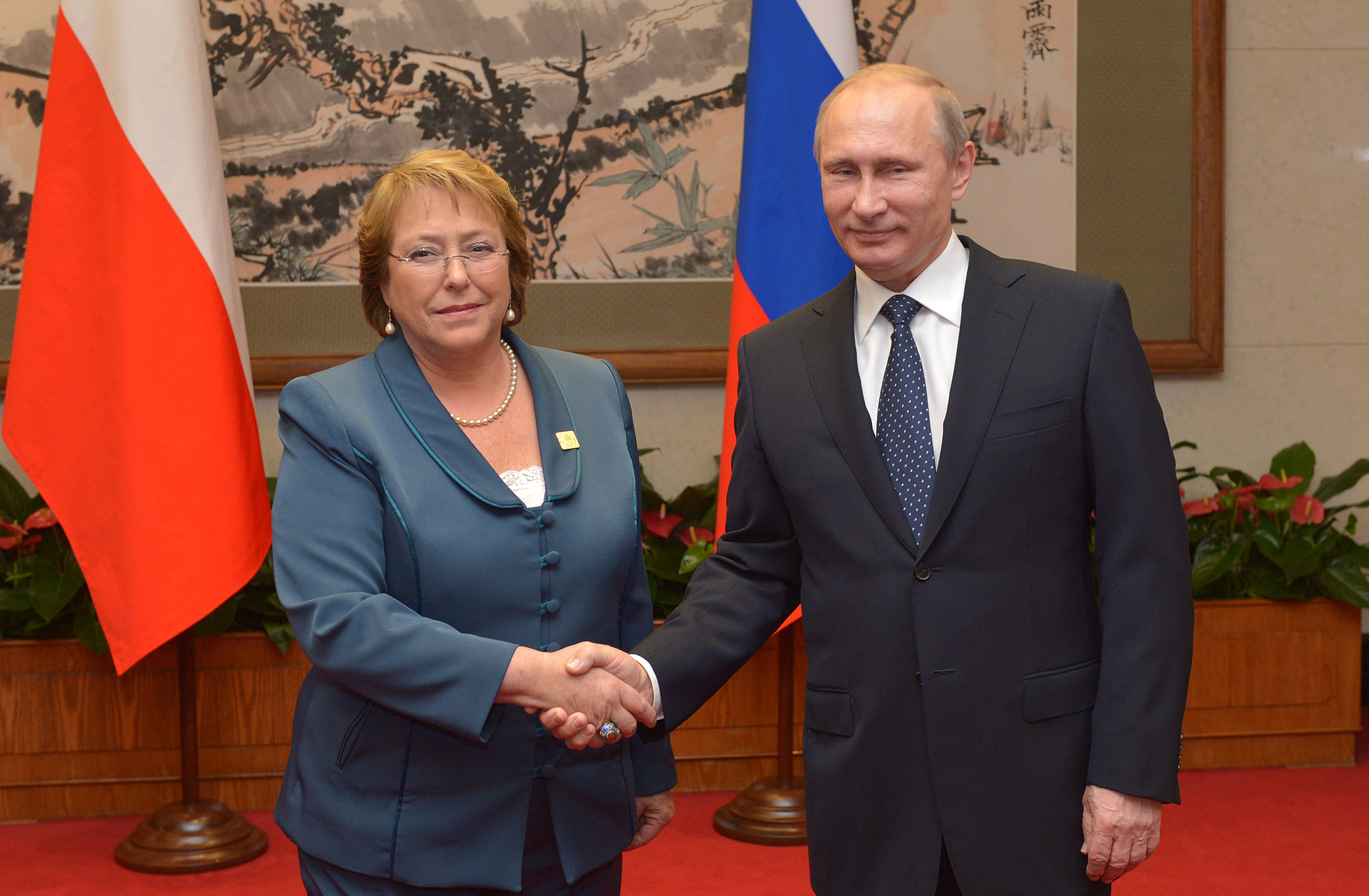
Russian President Vladimir Putin (right) with the Chilean President Michelle Bachelet (left), November 2014.

Chile–Russia relations (Russian: Российско-чилийские отношения, Spanish: Relaciones ruso-chilenas) are the bilateral foreign relations between the Republic of Chile and the Russian Federation. The establishment of diplomatic relations between Chile and the USSR countries happened on December 11, 1944.

Both countries are full members of APEC, the International Monetary Fund, and the United Nations.

== History ==
=== 1940s–1960s ===
Chile first established diplomatic relations with the Soviet Union on 11 December 1944; however, they were short-lived and were severed on 27 October 1947 due to the intensification of the Cold War and the banning of the Communist Party of Chile. In 1956, Soviet premier Nikolai Bulganin declared that the Soviet Union was willing to develop relations with Latin American countries on the basis of friendly cooperation, mutually beneficial trade relations, peaceful coexistence, and noninterference in internal affairs. For the first time since 1944, Soviet foreign policy allowed for increased relations between the Soviet Union and the Third World. In Chile, these changes were largely moot during the 1950s and 1960s as Chile was openly aligned with the United States from WWII onwards against the threat of "Communist aggression". Since they were allied with the United States, Chile halted all diplomatic relations with the Soviet Union, ended all forms of bilateral economic relations, and outlawed and persecuted Communist parties. The Cuban revolution of 1959 prompted a new wave of anti-Communism in Latin America, reaffirming the Chilean government's decision to stay clear of Soviet influence and relations.

After the accession of Christian Democrat Eduardo Frei Montalva to the presidency on 3 November 1964, relations were re-established on 24 November 1964, and it wasn't until 1967 that bilateral treaties were signed by the two states.

=== Relations during the Allende government: 1970–1973 ===
The victory of Salvador Allende in Chile's presidential election in 1970 gave the Soviet Union an opportunity to develop close ties with Chile. The victory of Allende's Unidad Popular, a coalition of Socialist, Communist, and miscellaneous leftist parties, demonstrated that perhaps Chile's government was ideologically and politically closer to the Soviet Union than any other South American country. However, the Soviet Union was hesitant to shoulder the burden in order to guarantee the success of the Chilean experiment. Economically, Soviet aid came in the form of long-term credits, which represented less than $350 million, with limited amount of aid in the form of hard currency. Allende's government needed more financial aid, not joint projects in fishing and housing, to solve balance-of-payments problems. Although bilateral trade between the two countries was expanded and diversified, it was still much lower than levels of trade between the Soviet Union and other South American countries. Lastly, the Soviet Union offered some forms of technical assistance in order to construct factories, oil production, and to operate the nationalized copper mines. The Soviet Union's limited levels of economic assistance in Chile display the clear Soviet hesitancy towards incurring enormous economic burdens. The Soviets had already seen the immense costs associated with supporting a Communist government in the western hemisphere following their support of Fidel Castro and his government in Cuba post-1959. By the early 1970s, the Soviet Union had begun practicing a détente with the United States, and increased support for the Allende government could endanger the fragile relationship between the United States and the Soviet Union. The Soviet Union was increasingly unwilling to allow Chilean revolutionary process destroy its new détente with the United States. The Soviet Union was also dealing with economic problems of its own which further deterred an increase in economic assistance to Chile. Starting around May 1972, leaders of the USSR started to see Chile as an example of what could go wrong in a revolutionary process rather than a good investment in the global battle against capitalism when the Allende government lost popular support and the Chilean economy remained at a standstill. Similarly, the Soviet Union practiced pragmatism in its political relations with Chile. At most, the Soviet Union only demonstrated moral and propagandistic support of Chile in lieu of more tangible policy.

When the United States cut-off financing to Chile over the latter's nationalisation of its copper industry, Allende was forced to seek alternative relationships for finance and trade, which culminated in a high-level Chilean delegation visiting the Soviet Union in May 1971, at which it was agreed that a Soviet-Chilean Trade Commission would be established. Allende went on a state visit to the Soviet Union in December 1972 with the aim of securing aid and financing from Leonid Brezhnev, but his visit was not a success. While some officials in Santiago believed that Allende's trip to the Soviet Union would force Moscow's hand into relieving Chile of its dependency on the United States, others argued it would not be sufficient to counteract Chile's balance-of-payments deficits. Allende and leader of the Chilean Communist Party Luis Corvalán met in December 1972 with Leonid Brezhnev, Alexi Kosygin, and Nikolai Podgorny. Allende and Corvalán's plan called for large short-term credits to offset a predicted Chilean deficit until 1976, Soviet bloc purchases of Chilean copper, and a $220 million investment in steel production. Allende tried to persuade Soviet leaders of this plan by arguing the idea of his country being a “silent Vietnam” in a futile attempt to invoke anti-American sentiment. Neither his plan nor this imagery was well received in Moscow, as the Soviet Union was already hesitant to openly defy the Americans in their own hemisphere. Allende left the Soviet Union with advice to resolve conflicts with Washington, a new credit of $45 million, and agreements using previously agreed credits to increase the USSR's technical assistance in developing Chile's copper, chemical, and fishing industries. Unfortunately for Allende, instead of increasing aid in Chile, the Soviet Union reduced economic support from $144 million in 1972 to $63 million in 1973. Allende was overthrown in a coup d'état on 11 September 1973. The initial Soviet response was cautious (as the USSR had not previously severed relations with Latin American countries where right-wing juntas had seized power). Chile's junta itself informed the USSR on 15 September 1973, that they would assume all commercial commitments and debts of the overthrown government. The relations however deteriorated rapidly amid mutual accusations and the USSR cut the diplomatic relations on 22 September 1973,

=== No diplomatic relations during the Pinochet regime: 1973–1990 ===
The Soviet-Chile relations having been suspended on 21 September 1973, the Embassy of India took over the affairs of the Soviet Union (China, which chose not to sever relations with Chile allowed socialist countries to temporarily keep a couple of administrators to oversee the properties of their former diplomatic missions). The Pinochet government almost instantaneously began attacking Soviet citizens and pursuing an extremely anti-Soviet agenda. The Soviet Union responded strongly by offering aid to persecuted members and supporters of Allende's previous administration and by denouncing the Chilean government as fascist.

In 1976, one of the symbolic events of the Cold War took place: the Chilean regime had decided to release Luis Corvalan, the Communist Party leader from prison, and on the advice of the US (which was acting as an intermediary, as Chile and the USSR had no diplomatic relations), they demanded in turn the release of Vladimir Bukovsky, a Soviet political prisoner. To the amazement of the Americans, the KGB chairman Yuri Andropov himself, who dealt with the issue, agreed. The exchange of the political prisoners took place on 18 December 1976 in Zürich.

=== Diplomatic relations since 1990 ===
Relations between the USSR and Chile were restored on 11 March 1990. President Ricardo Lagos paid a state visit to Russia in October 2002, and President Vladimir Putin paid a state visit to Chile in November 2004, in conjunction with the APEC summit in Santiago, marking the first visit by a Russian head of state to South America. Michelle Bachelet paid an official visit to Russia from 2 – 4 April 2009 at the invitation of Dmitry Medvedev. In June 2020, the Russian embassy in Santiago received an anonymous phony bomb threat, following similar incidents against Russian diplomatic missions in Brazil and Argentina; a person calling himself "Suffusion of Yellow" later went on to claim responsibility.

== Trade relations ==
In 2001 bilateral trade between the two nations totalled US$50 million, increasing to $300 million in 2007, and $380 million in 2008. In 2014 bilateral trade reached $820 million.

Chile is also looking forward to establishing new export outlets in Russia for its growing blueberry output. It has exhibited to the last IFE show in Moscow for the first time. In 2007–2008, Russia leapfrogged Spain to become Chile's third largest fruit export market in Europe, with overall exports to the country (mainly apples and table grapes) growing by 59 percent, from 64,554 tonnes to 102,321 tonnes.

== Resident diplomatic missions ==
- Chile has an embassy in Moscow.
- Russia has an embassy in Santiago.
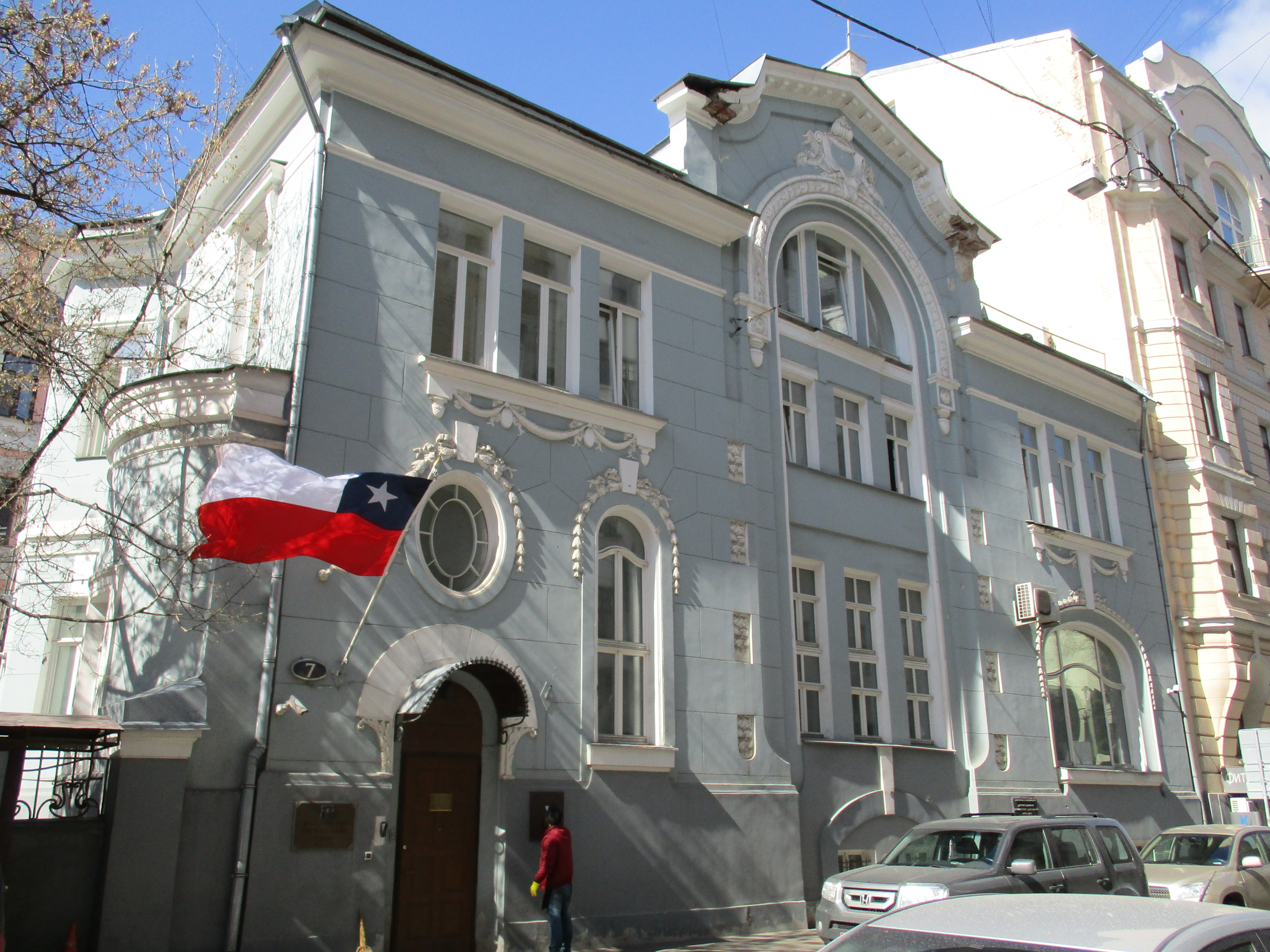
Embassy of Chile in Moscow

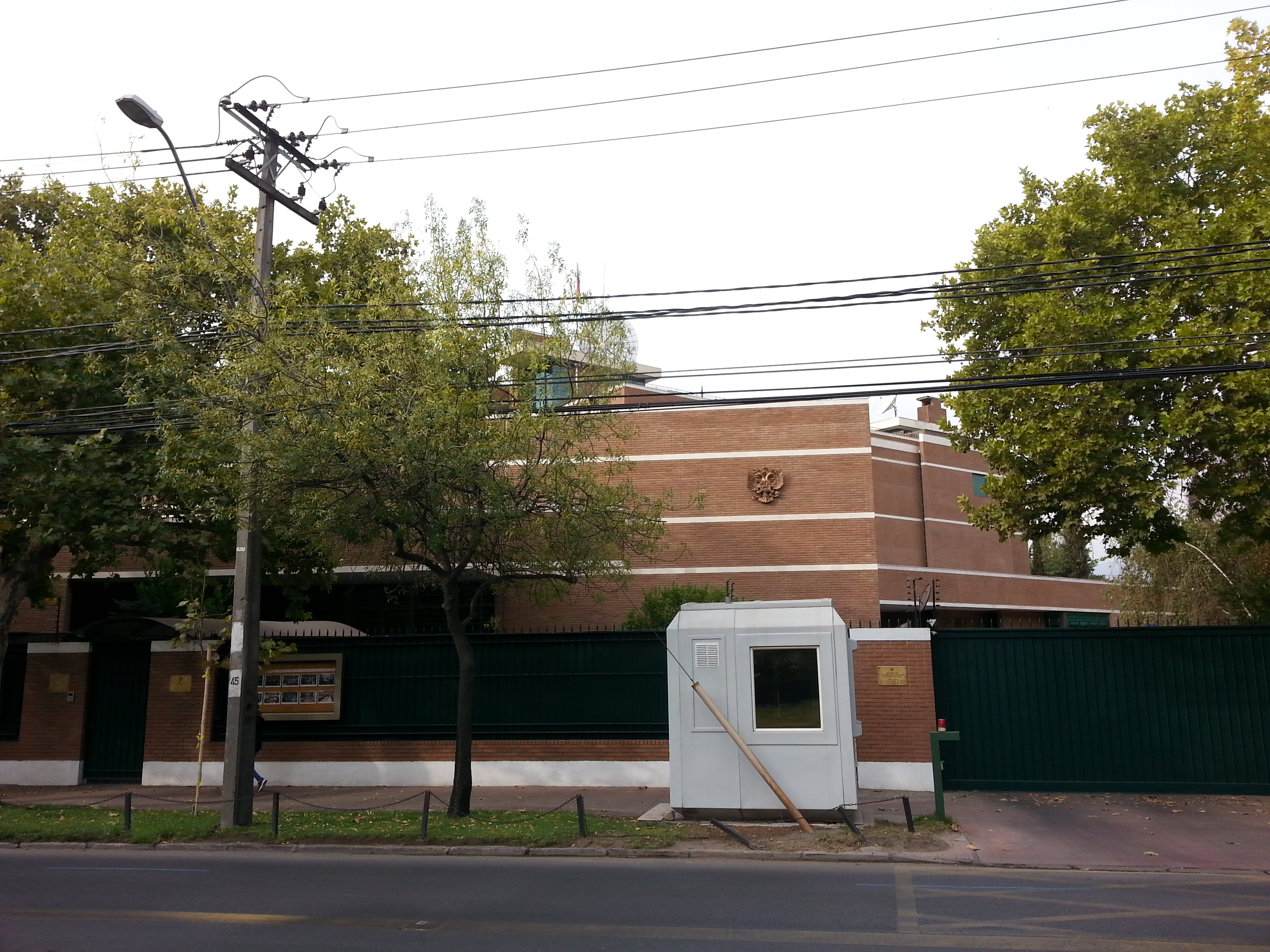
Embassy of Russia in Santiago

== See also ==
- Russian Chileans
- List of ambassadors of Russia to Chile
