= Chile–Greece relations =

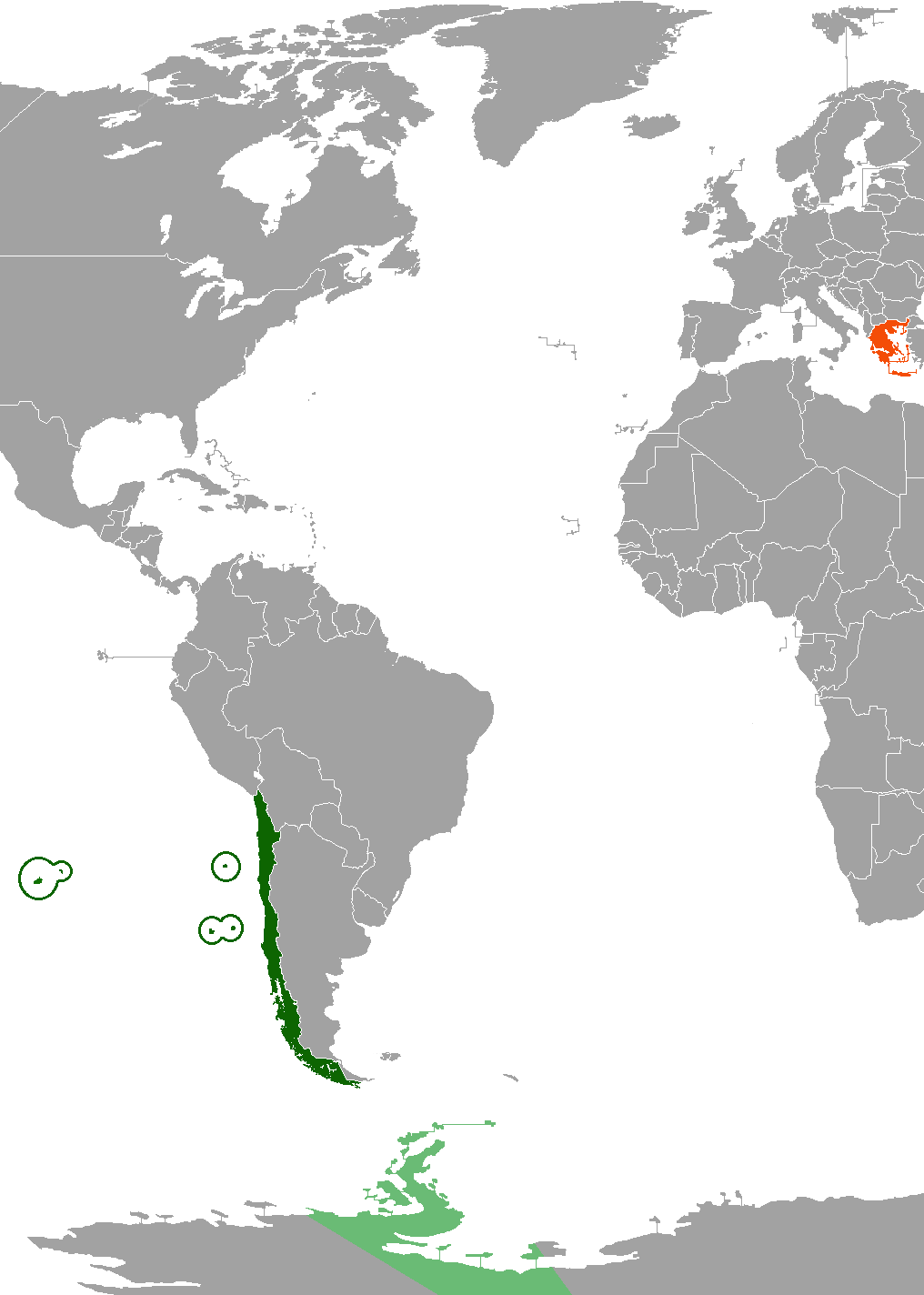
- Chile: Greece

Chile–Greece relations are the bilateral relations between Chile and Greece. Both nations are members of the United Nations.

== List of bilateral visits ==
- In June 2003, the Speaker of the Chilean Chamber of Deputies, Isabel Allende, visited Athens.
- In October 2003, the Greek Foreign Minister George Papandreou visited Santiago.
- In 2004, the then Chilean Defense Minister and future President of Chile Michelle Bachelet visited Athens.

== List of bilateral treaties and agreements ==
- Cultural Agreement. Signed in Athens on May 14, 1962.
- Tourist Agreement. Signed in Santiago on September 15, 1994.
- Framework agreement on economic, scientific and technological cooperation. Signed in Santiago on September 15, 1994.
- Protocol for Consultations between Foreign Ministries. Signed in Athens on July 10, 1996.
- Agreement to abolish visas for diplomatic, government service, and official passports. Signed in Athens on July 10, 1996.
- Agreement for the promotion and mutual protection of investments. Signed on July 10, 1996.

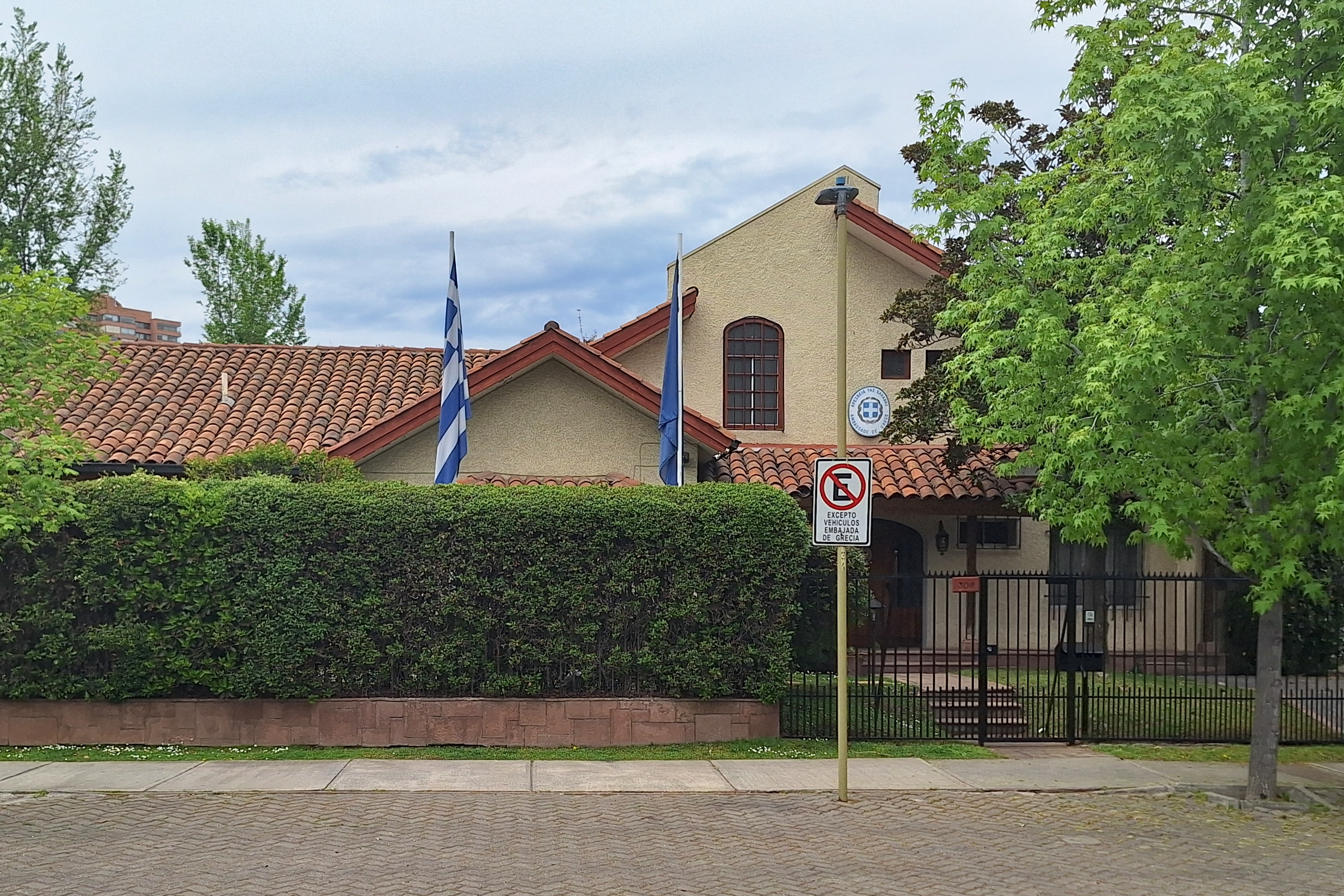
Embassy of Greece in Santiago

== Resident diplomatic missions ==
- Chile has an embassy in Athens.
- Greece has an embassy in Santiago.

== See also ==
- Foreign relations of Chile
- Foreign relations of Greece
- Greeks in Chile
