= Old Believers in North America =

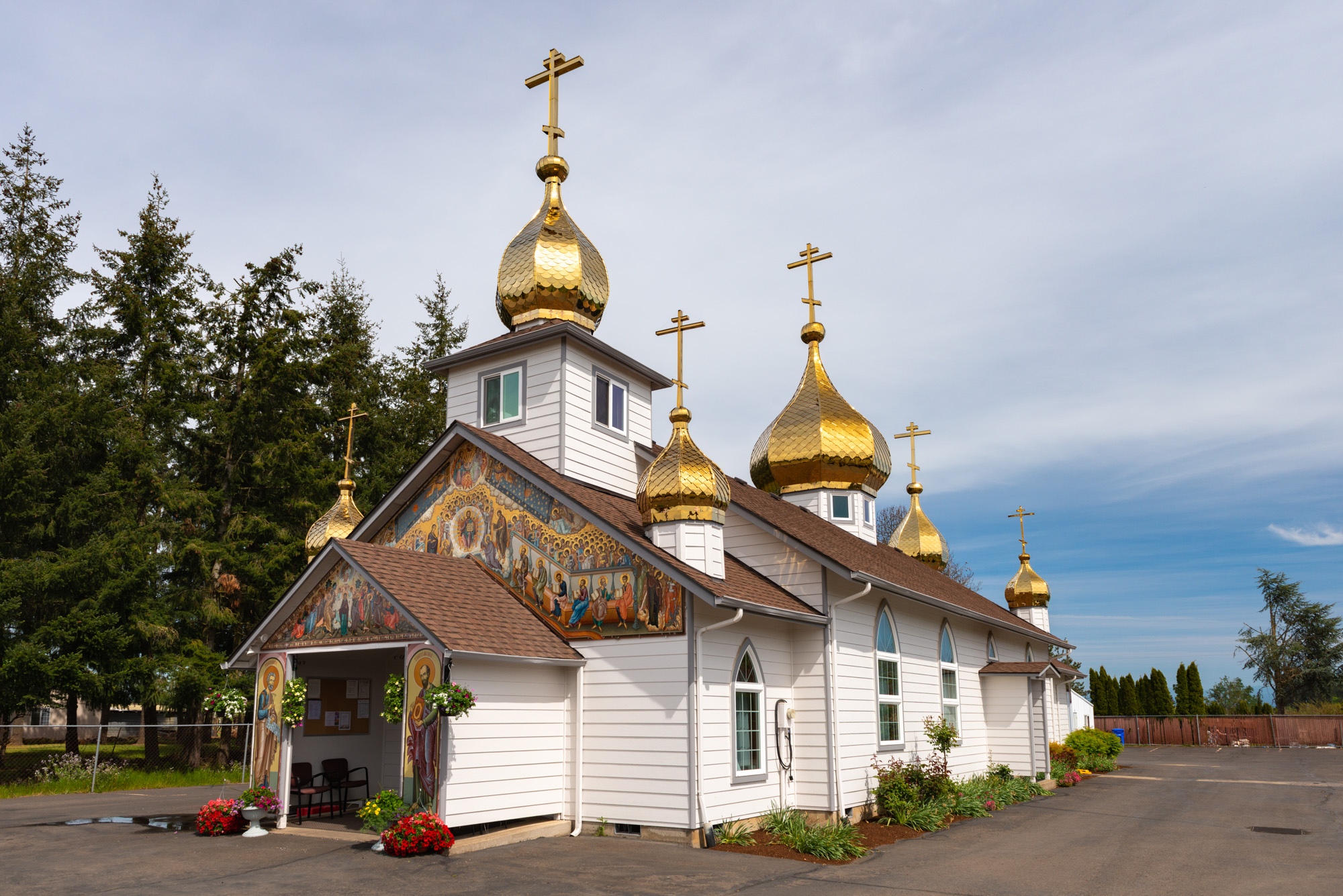
- Church of the Holy Ascension in Gervais, Oregon

Regions with significant populations
- Oregon: c. 10,000
- Alaska: c. 2,000
- Alberta: c. 500

Languages
- Russian; English

Related ethnic groups
- Old Believers in South America; Russian Americans; Russian Canadians

Old Believers, ethnic Russians who reject the mainstream Russian Orthodox Church due to 17th-century liturgical reforms, have had a presence in North America since the late 19th century. The largest community is in the US state of Oregon, with around 10,000 Old Believers. Another substantial community exists in Alaska, with around 2,000 people.

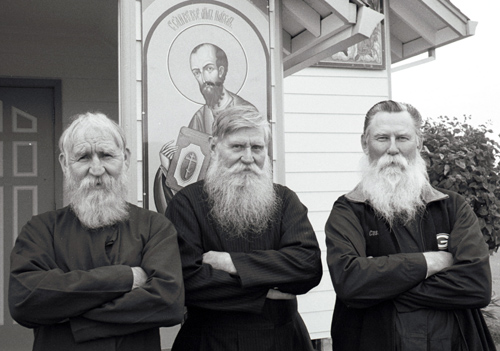
Old Believer men in front of their church in Oregon

== History ==
Old Believers first arrived in the United States in the late 19th century from present-day Poland, Lithuania, and Belarus. They were mainly priestless Pomorians, and they settled in Michigan, New Jersey, and western and southern Pennsylvania. A larger group of immigrants arrived in the first decade of the 20th century. They worked in mines and factories, and gradually assimilated to American culture. The first Old Believers in the US immigrated primarily for economic (rather than religious) reasons, and many did not intend to settle permanently in the country. However, the upheaval of World War I, Russian Revolution, and establishment of the Soviet Union prevented them from returning to their homes. At the same time, the wars and revolutions prevented emigration and cut connections between diaspora communities and their homelands. The first Old Believer prayer house in North America was built in 1910 in Marianna, Pennsylvania, with brick donated by the Pittsburgh-Buffalo Coal Company. By 1913 the Old Believer population in Pennsylvania numbered around 3,000, primarily located in Marianna, Erie, Monessen, Cokeburgh, and Russellton. Another prayer house, the Church of the Nativity, was opened in Erie in 1919. More reliable employment incentivized movement from the coal mines of Marianna to Erie, forming an Old Believer enclave, and the Erie congregation was larger than that of Marianna by 1937.

The first significant group of Old Believer immigrants in Canada arrived from Manchuria in the 1920s, fleeing the aftermath of the Russian Revolution and instability in China. (Note: There is some evidence of an Old Believer presence in Canada as early as the turn of the 20th century. In 1908 archimandrite Pavel Semenov, a defector to the priested Belokrinitskaya Hierarchy, was made "Bishop of Canada". However, there was probably not a significant Old Believer population in Canada at that time; the creation of a Canadian diocese may have been a missionary effort to compete with other Orthodox hierarchies in North America. Semenov died in 1916 having never visited Canada.) The only extant community originating from this cohort is the congregation in Hines Creek, Alberta.

In the 1960s, reports of available farmland motivated around 2,000 Old Believers to establish a colony between Gervais and Mt. Angel, near Woodburn, Oregon. The majority of Old Believers in Woodburn migrated from Turkey, and a significant minority came from Harbin in China.

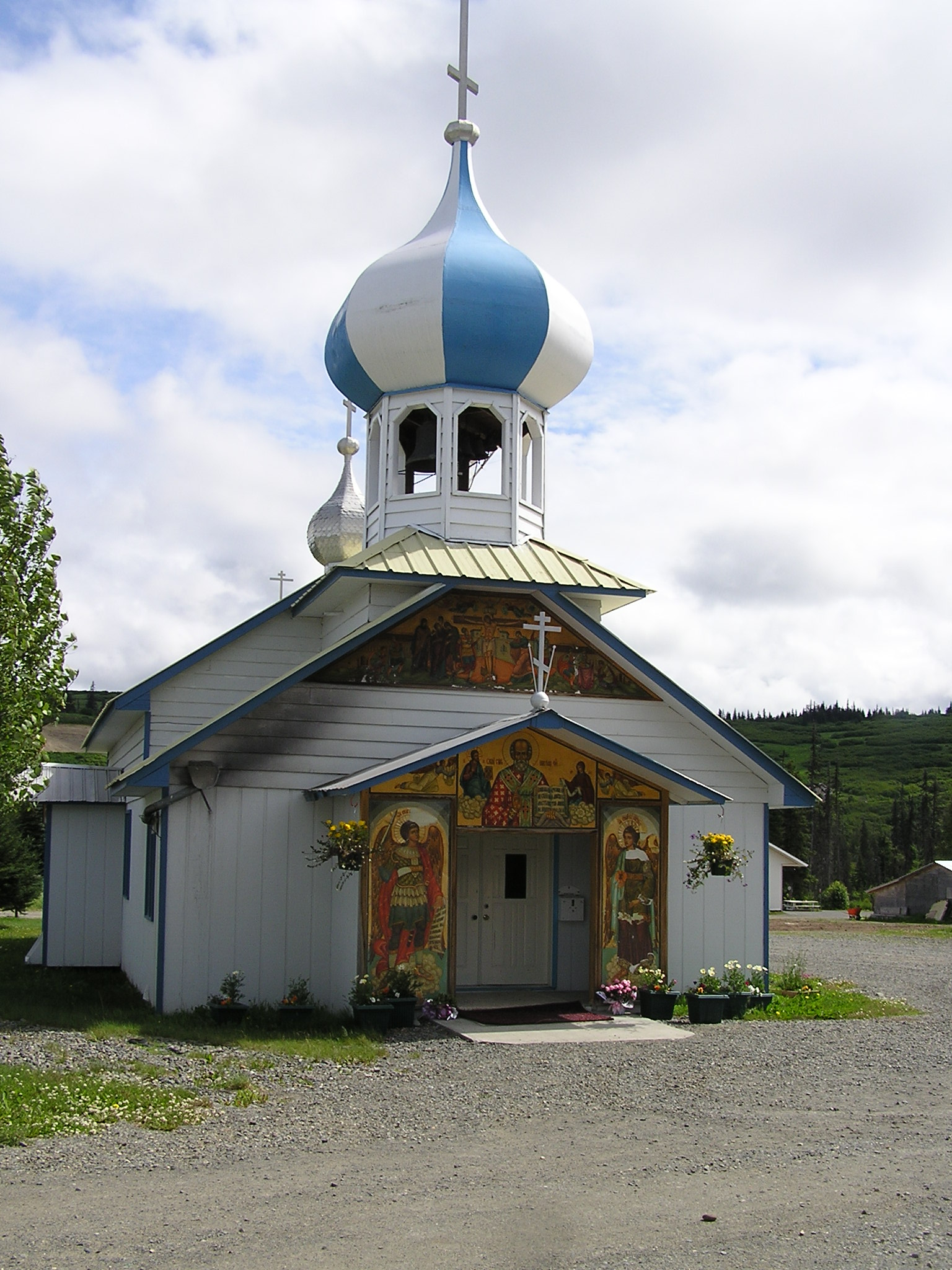
The church in Nikolaevsk, Alaska

In 1967, five families from the Woodburn area migrated north to the Kenai Peninsula in Alaska, desiring further isolation from society. There they founded Nikolaevsk, and many became fishermen. Due to a conflict over ordination of priests among residents of Nikolaevsk, five priestless families founded a new village, Berezovka, near Willow, Alaska in 1984.

== Demographics and geography ==
=== Canada ===
About 500 Old Believers live in Alberta, forming most of the Old Believer population of Canada. One congregation is near Hines Creek, and another is in Lac La Biche.

=== United States ===
A Voice of America report on the Old Believer community in Nikolaevsk, Alaska

The largest community of Old Believers in North America is located in Oregon, and numbers around 10,000. As of 2017, there were eleven sobors (prayer halls) in Oregon. According to Alexander Dolitsky, the prayer halls in Oregon reflect the divides among Old Believers in the state into three groups: those who migrated from Harbin, Xinjiang, and Turkey.

The largest Old Believer settlement in Alaska is Nikolaevsk. In total there are around 2,000 Old Believers in Alaska.

The Church of the Nativity in Erie, Pennsylvania remains the largest congregation in the eastern US.

== Factions ==
=== Priestless ===
The priestless (bezpopovtsy) communities in the eastern United States (Pennsylvania, Michigan, New York, and New Jersey) descend from the original late 19th-century cohort of Old Believer immigrants from present-day Poland, the Baltics, and northwestern Russia. They are mostly Pomortsy, with a small minority of Fedoseevtsy who integrated into the larger community.

=== Priested ===
There is a priested (popovtsy) congregation in Nikolaevsk, Alaska (centered on the Church of Saint Nicholas, part of the Belokrinitskaya Hierarchy).
