= Mauricio Amster =

Ukrainian typographer (1907–1980)

Mauricio Amster Cats
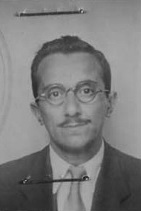
- Born: 1907; Lemberg, Austro-Hungarian Empire
- Died: 1980 (aged 72–73); Santiago, Chile
- Occupations: Typographer, calligrapher, illustrator, graphic artist, designer, educator, writer, translator, book collector

Mauricio Amster Cats (1907–1980) was born in Lemberg and died in Santiago, Chile. He was a typographer, calligrapher, illustrator, graphic artist and designer, educator, writer, translator, and book collector who designed more than 500 books in Chile.

== Biography ==
=== Early life ===
Amster was born into a Sephardic Jewish family and finished his bachelor education in Lviv. In 1927, he left for Austria, leaving his family behind (his parents died in the Nazi concentration camp in Belzec). Shortly after arriving in Vienna, he was unable to continue his studies at the Academy of Fine Arts; he left for Berlin, where he studied at the Reimann School between 1927 and 1930. In Depression-ravaged Germany, he could not find work and subsequently moved to Madrid, Spain.

=== Life in Spain ===
He worked as a freelance artist for publishers Dedalo, Oriente, Zeus, and Ulises. Before mid-1936, he joined the Communist Party, and in his position as the person "responsible for transport of the National Artistic Treasure" traveled to Valencia, protecting paintings evacuated from the Museo del Prado. In July 1937, he participated in the Congress of Anti-fascist Intellectuals, where he met Chilean poets Vicente Huidobro and Pablo Neruda, who since 1935 had been a cultural attaché in the Chilean embassy.

He worked in the Ministry of Public Instructions and Arts, where he developed the famous "Cartilla", an ideological elementary textbook for uneducated soldiers of the Republican Army (published in October 1937 with 125,000 in the initial edition, translated to many languages). He married Adina Amenedo and escaped with her from Barcelona, crossing to France on January 24, 1939 to avoid being arrested by the troops loyal to General Francisco Franco.

=== Life in Chile ===
He left Europe on board the SS Winnipeg from Bordeaux, France, on August 1, 1939, with 2,200 immigrants helped by Pablo Neruda and the Chilean government. They arrived a month later in Valparaíso. He started his career in Chile designing the arts and literary criticism journal Babel, then worked for the publishing house Cruz del Sur, and finally worked as an art director with the publishing house Editorial Zig-Zag until 1947.

He later developed an intense professional link with the publisher Universitaria (publisher of Anales and Revista de Filosofia at the University of Chile and books such as Mis viajes of Ignacy Domeyko). He also worked as a professor of graphic arts. He founded the School of Journalism, Communication Science and Technology, with Ernesto Montenegro. He worked for the publisher Editorial del Pacifico.

Amster died in 1980 in Santiago, Chile.

== Bibliography ==
1. Dabrowski, Christopher H. (2013). Mauricio Amster Cats. Santiago: Instituto Varsovienne.
2. Tejeda, Juan Guillermo (2011). Amster. Santiago: Universidad Diego Portales.
3. Pérez, Carlos (April 1997). Mauricio Amster: Semblanza biográfica del Instituto Valenciano de Arte Moderno. Valencia: IVAM Centre Julio González.

== Publications ==
- Amster, Mauricio (1960). Técnica gráfica del periodismo. Editorial Universitaria.
- Amster, Mauricio (1966). Técnica gráfica. Evolución, procedimientos y aplicaciones. Editorial Universitaria.
- Amster, Mauricio (1973). Normas de composición. Guía para autores, editores, correctores y tipógrafos. Editorial Universitaria.
- Amster, Mauricio (1980). La ilustración del libro por medios manuales. Santiago: El Bibliófolo.
