= SS Winnipeg =

French steamer notable for carrying refugees from the Spanish Civil War

Coordinates: 49°51′N 27°58′W

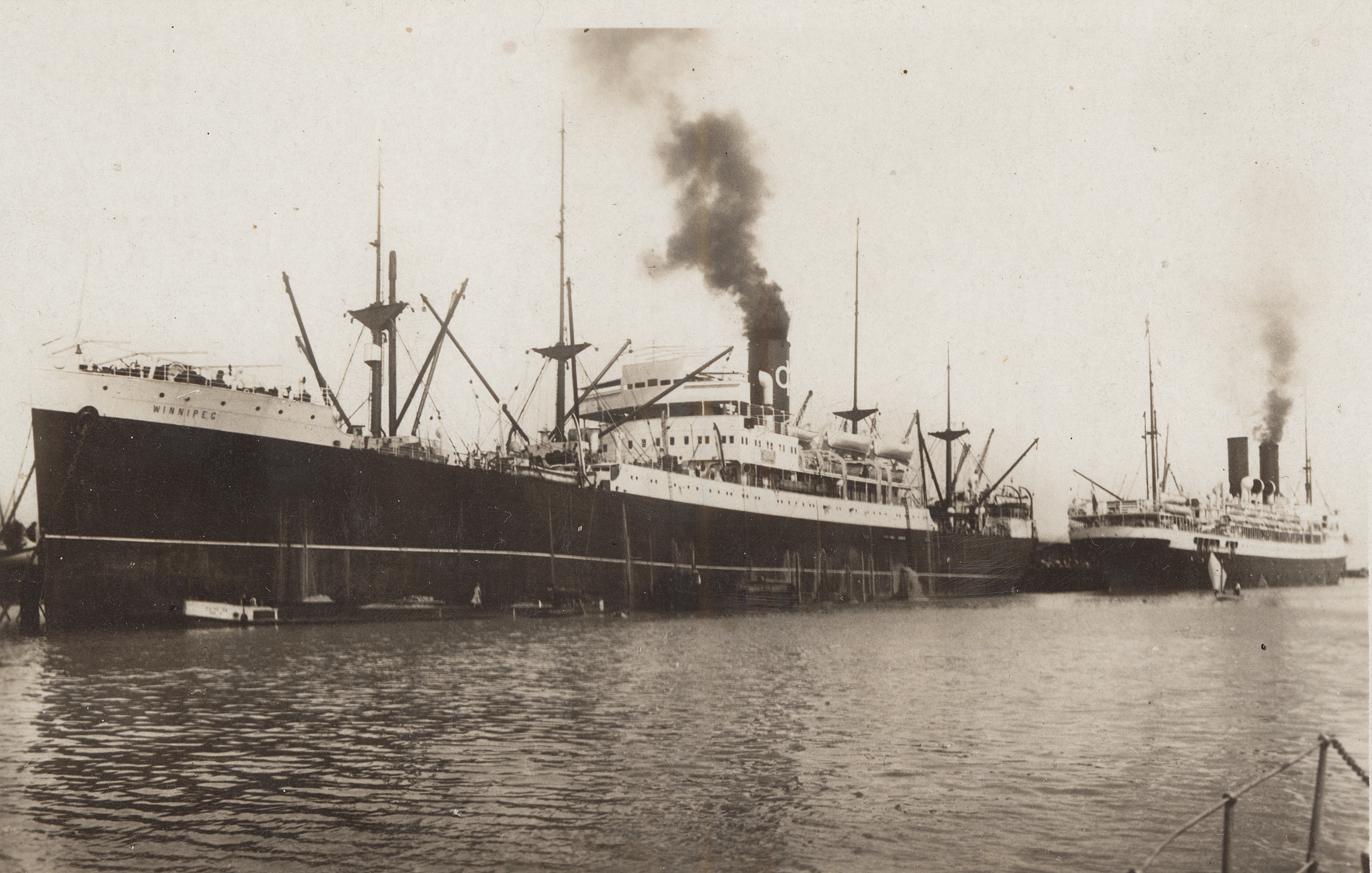
- SS Winnipeg in 1939

History
- Name: 1918–1930: SS Jacques Cartier; 1930–1938: SS Winnipeg; 1938–1941: Paimpol; 1941: SS Winnipeg; 1941–1942: SS Winnipeg II
- Owner: 1918–1938: (France) Cie. Générale Transatlantique, Paris; 1938–1941 Compagnie France-Navigation (C. F. N.), Le Havre; 1941–1941 (United Kingdom) British Government; 1941–1942 (Canada) Canadian Pacific Steamships
- Port of registry: 1918–1941: France; 1941: United Kingdom; 1941–1942: Canada
- Builder: Ateliers & Chantiers de France, Dunkirk, France
- Fate: Sunk, 22 October 1942

General characteristics
- Type: Passenger ship
- Tonnage: 9,807 GRT
- Length: 143.9 m (472 ft 1 in)
- Beam: 18.2 m (59 ft 9 in)
- Propulsion: 2 × triple expansion engines
- Speed: 14 knots (26 km/h; 16 mph)
- Crew: 114

SS Winnipeg was a French steamer notable for arriving at Valparaíso, Chile, on 3 September 1939, with 2,200 Spanish immigrants aboard. The refugees were fleeing Spain after Franco's victory in the Spanish Civil War (1936–1939). The Chilean President Pedro Aguirre Cerda had named the poet Pablo Neruda Special Consul in Paris for Immigration, and he was charged with what he called "the noblest mission I have ever undertaken": shipping the Spanish refugees, who had been housed by the French government in internment camps, to Chile.

== History ==
After the end of the Spanish Civil War, Pablo Neruda noticed that many Spanish Republicans had fled in exile to France where they were detained in squalid camps in miserable conditions. The poet, who was then living in Chile, decided to organize their travel to Chile. He first worked as Chilean consul in Spain, before being named consul in Paris.

The ship was an old French cargo ship which ordinarily could not take more than 250 persons, but it was adapted so it could carry the 2,200 refugees. Neruda actively worked in this endeavour, reuniting families separated by the war. Beside the assistance of his friends artists and writers, he was helped by his wife Delia del Carril.

On the night when Winnipeg set sail, on 4 August 1939, in the port of Trompeloup - Pauillac, Pablo Neruda wrote:

Que la crítica borre toda mi poesía, si le parece. Pero este poema, que hoy recuerdo, no podrá borrarlo nadie.

The critics may erase all of my poetry, if they want. But this poem, that today I remember, nobody will be able to erase.

Winnipeg arrived at the port of Valparaíso on 3 September 1939. On the following day, the Spanish Republicans were officially received by the Chilean authorities. Some of them had already landed, a few days before, in the port of Arica, in northern Chile. In a gesture of gratitude, the refugees attached to the ship's mast a large canvas with the face of the Chilean president painted on it.

Most of the immigrants who landed in Chile stayed there. Among them were the historian Leopoldo Castedo, the typographer Mauricio Amster and the painters Roser Bru and José Balmes. Victor Pey, who boarded the ship after being a prisoner of war in France, became one of the closest advisors to Salvador Allende.

Winnipeg remained under French flag after the fall of France in 1940 and sailed under orders of the Vichy government. She was captured on 26 May 1941 by the Dutch sloop HNLMS Van Kinsbergen in the Caribbean Sea and confiscated by the British government. Among the 732 passengers were eight Jewish photographers who were saved from internment and persecution in France by the Emergency Rescue Committee headed by Varian Fry: the Belgian Charles Leirens, the French portrait photographer of Ukrainian-Jewish origin Boris Lipnitzky, the Hungarian animal photographer Ylla (Camilla Henriette Koffler), the Germans Ilse Bing, Josef Breitenbach, Charlotte “Yolla” Niclas-Sachs, Fred Stein and Simon Tannenwald. The ship was eventually purchased by a Canadian company, Canadian Pacific Steamships, some months later and renamed Winnipeg II. She was torpedoed and sunk by the German submarine U-443 on 22 October 1942 while en route from Liverpool to Saint John, New Brunswick. All people on board were rescued by the Canadian corvette HMCS Morden.

== See also ==
- Demographics of Chile
- Presidential Republic Era (1924–1973)
