= Víctor Pey =

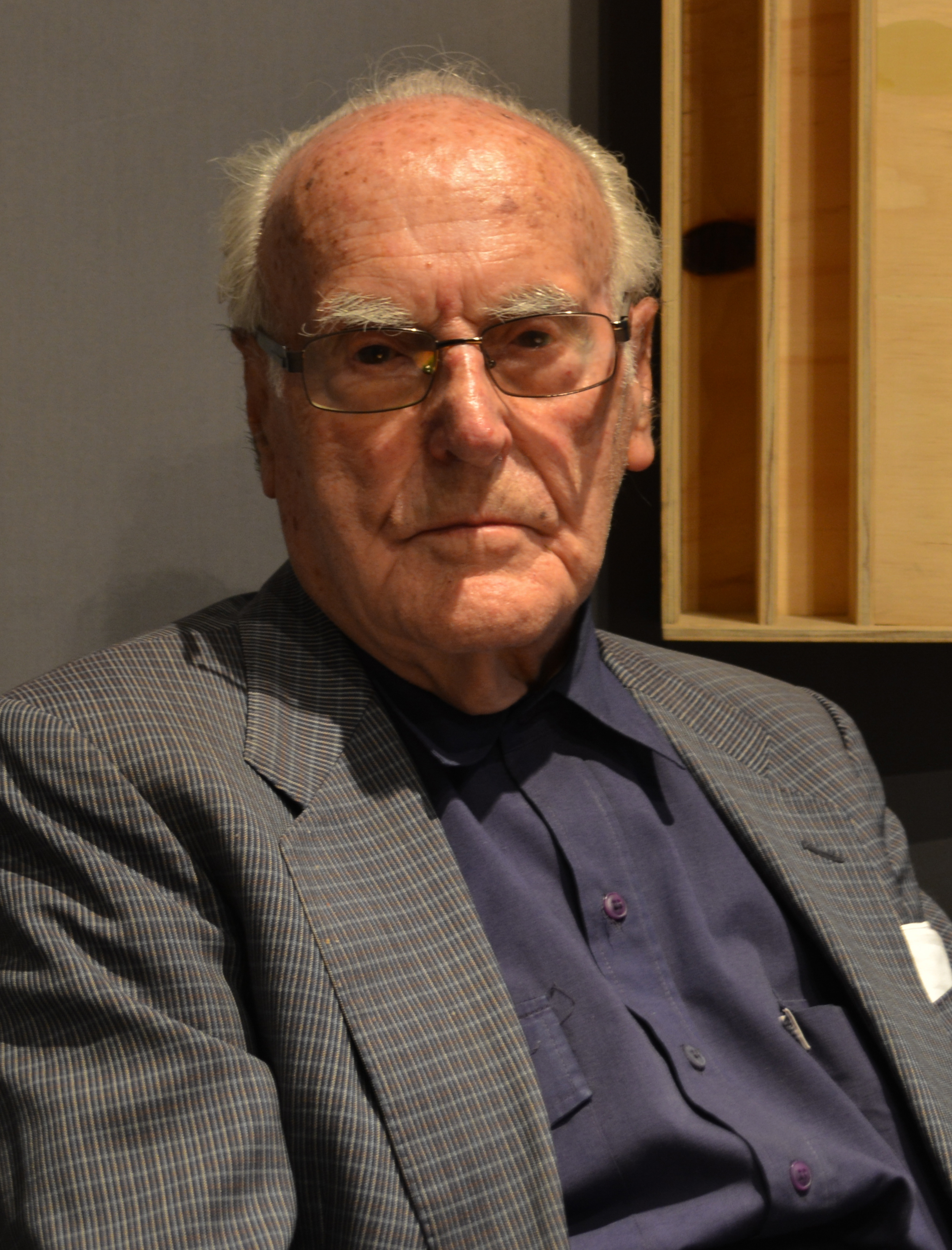
Pey at age 100 in 2015

Víctor Pey Casado (31 August 1915 – 5 October 2018) was a Spanish-born Chilean engineer, professor and businessman.

He was born in Madrid, the son of writer and priest Segismundo Pey Ordeix, and Manuela Casado, from Valladolid. At the age of two, he moved with his family to Barcelona. During the Spanish Civil War, he fought on the Republican side and was a member to the Durruti Column. He formed part of the Spanish government in exile as a technical advisor to the War Industries Commission of Catalonia. He crossed the Pyrenees into France on 25 January 1939, was interned by French authorities and sent to a prison camp at Perpignan. In September 1939, Pablo Neruda arranged that Pey and his family board the SS Winnipeg for Chile.

After arriving in Santiago, he found work as a surveyor, together with the engineer José Saitúa, who was in charge of the construction of an aqueduct between Laguna Negra and Santiago. Pey became a naturalized Chilean citizen and worked with his brother Raúl in an engineering company. Pey met Salvador Allende during a party hosted by Aníbal Jara Letelier, editor of La Hora newspaper. When Allende became President in 1970, Pey became an advisor to the Popular Unity government and was one of his closest associates. He purchased the newspaper El Clarín during Allende's presidency, which became the largest newspaper in Chile. After the Pinochet dictatorship was imposed in 1973, El Clarín was shut down. Pey was persecuted by the military junta and went into exile, not returning until the 1990s.

In 1997, Pey initiated a lawsuit against the Chilean government in the World Bank Tribunal for the expropriation of his newspaper. Successive Chilean administrations held the position of not paying Pey. After a 19-year legal battle, the case was dismissed without Pey receiving any damages.

Pey identified as an agnostic. He was named honorary rector of the University of Chile in 2015, coinciding with his centenary. He died of natural causes on 5 October 2018, aged 103.
