= Greeks in Chile =

Greeks in Chile Griegos en Chile Έλληνες της Χιλής
Total population
- 100,000

Regions with significant populations
- Antofagasta, Valparaíso, La Serena, Coquimbo, Santiago de Chile.

Languages
- Chilean Spanish, Greek

Religion
- Christianity (mainly Eastern Orthodox)

Related ethnic groups
- Greeks, Greek diaspora, Greeks in Brazil

There has been a community of Greeks in Chile since the sixteenth century. The Greek community in Chile is estimated to have 100,000 descendants. Most reside either in the Santiago, Coquimbo or in the Antofagasta area.

== Immigration ==
The first immigrants from Greece arrived during the sixteenth century from Crete, and surnamed "Candia" after the island's capital, the current Heraklion. The surname, although at present, is very disconnected from its ancient origins. The majority of Greek immigrants arrived in Chile at the beginning of the 20th century, some as part of their spirit of adventure and escape from the rigors of the First World War and the burning of Smyrna in Asia Minor, although many Greeks had already settled in Antofagasta, including crews of the ships commanded by Arturo Prat for the Pacific War (1879–1883) in the naval battle of Iquique (boatswain Constantine Micalvi).

Amid this flood of foreigners who populated northern Chilean appeared the Greeks. There were numerous Collectivité Hellenic whose records were listed in the newspaper El Mercurio of Antofagasta, which said that between 1920 and 1935 there were about 400 Greeks in the city, and another 300 in saltpeter offices.

In 1926 the first women's association for excellence, filóptoxos (friends of the poor) was set up, chaired by Xrisí Almallotis. Since then as of 2022 there have been four or five generations of descendants of Greeks. Some have moved south and are grouped mainly in Santiago and Valparaíso. Others returned to Greece after the First World War, but most of the immigrants stayed in their new country and formed Greek-Chilean families. Constantino Kochifas Carcamo, owner of cruise company Cruceros Skorpios in Puerto Montt, is a member of this community.

== Antofagasta ==
Antofagasta is a community in Latin America established in 1890, notable for a town anniversary on 14 February, in which foreign communities set up a stand. Many of the original families moved to Santiago and Valparaíso, however there are still an estimated seventy current residents who were born in Greece.

== Notable people ==
- Miguel Littin, film director, screenwriter, film producer and novelist.
- Ángela Jeria, mother of Michelle Bachelet, president of Chile.
- Irina Karamanos, first lady of Chile.

== See also ==
- Chile-Greece relations
- Greek diaspora
