= Russian Chileans =

Total population
- 1,300

Regions with significant populations
- Santiago

Languages
- Chilean Spanish, Russian, Yiddish

Religion
- Eastern Orthodox Church and Judaism

Related ethnic groups
- Russians

Russian Chileans form a minor part of the Russian diaspora and a small group in comparison to the other ethnic groups in Chile. The 2002 Chilean Census reported 638 Russian citizens, although Russia's government estimates that 1,300 Russians live in Chile. There are more than 70,000 Orthodox Christians in Chile, the majority of them of Russian or Greek origin. Also, a significant amount of Russian Jews arrived in Chile during the 20th century.

== History ==
The first Russians came to Chile in the early 19th century as part of naval expeditions circumnavigating the globe, among them captains Otto Kotsebu, Fyodor Litke, and Vasili Golovnin. However, they were just temporary visitors; the earliest Russian migrants came in 1854. The immigrants of that time belonged to different ethnic groups of the Russian Empire, particularly to minorities. Among them were seafarers and traders as well as medical professionals such as Alexei Sherbakov, who served as a surgeon in the Chilean Navy during the War of the Pacific. In the period between World War I and World War II, political motivations for migration came to the forefront; the number of White emigres in Chile grew to about 90. In the 1950s, their numbers were further bolstered by arrivals from among the Russian expatriate community in Harbin. The Russian Cemetery was founded in 1954 to provide a separate space for burials for the community.

As of 2004, the total size of the Russian expatriate community in Chile was estimated at 250 individuals by the local Russian embassy. Motivations for the recent migration include opportunities for small business, the ease of acquiring mortgages to purchase housing, as well as the weather. They are employed as professors in educational centres, as well as in Chilean food export companies. Community associations they have formed include the Corporación Cultural Alejandro Lipchutz, which boasts 95 members including 70 non-Russians; they work to disseminate information about Russian culture and life.

== Religion ==
Russians, along with Ukrainians and Greeks, were the first immigrants of the Orthodox faith to come to Chile. In the 1920s, Eleodoro Antipov founded the first Orthodox chapel, the Iglesia de la Santísima Trinidad, in Patronato; father Nicolas Kashnikoff also created the less well-known chapel of Our Lady of Kazan, which was later taken over by father Vladimir Uliantzeff. Subsequently, after the end of World War II, Chile played host to a large number of refugees not just from Russia, but Ukraine and Greece as well, which bolstered the numbers of the Orthodox community. There are more than seventy thousand Orthodox believers in Chile, and 15 Orthodox churches and chapels, mostly under the authority of the Patriarch of Antioch.

== Notable people ==
This is a list of Russian expatriates in Chile and Chileans of Russian descent:

- Miguel Krassnoff, Chilean brigadier
- Olga Ulianova, historian
- Katherine Salosny

== See also ==
- Chile-Russia relations
- Russian diaspora
- Immigration to Chile
