= Goler =

Goler may refer to:

== People ==
- Wendell Goler, Senior White House and Foreign Affairs correspondent for Fox News Channel
- Goler T. Butcher, professor of international law at Howard University.
- Goler clan, a clan of poor, rural families living in Nova Scotia and the subjects of the book On South Mountain: The Dark Secrets of the Goler Clan
- George W. Goler, pioneering pediatrician

== Other uses ==
- Goler Metropolitan AME Zion Church, a church in Winston-Salem, North Carolina on the National Register of Historic Places
- Goler Memorial African Methodist Episcopal Zion Church, a church in Winston-Salem, North Carolina on the National Register of Historic Places

== See also ==
- Göhler, a surname
