= Italian Chileans =

Chilean citizens of Italian descent

Italo-cileni (Italian) Ítalo-chilenos (Spanish)
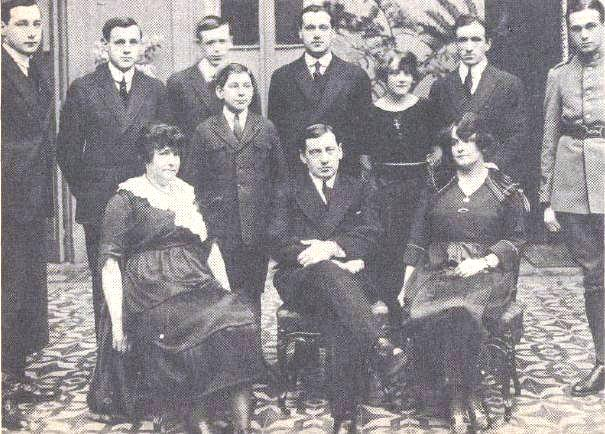
- Family Alessandri, of Italian descent, in 1920, with two future presidents of Chile, Arturo Alessandri (1920–1925 and 1932–1938) and Jorge Alessandri (1958–1964)

Total population
- c. 52,000 (by birth) c. 600,000 (by ancestry)

Regions with significant populations
- Valparaíso, Santiago, Concepción

Languages
- Chilean Spanish · Italian and Italian dialects

Religion
- Roman Catholicism

Related ethnic groups
- Italians, Italian Americans, Italian Argentines, Italian Bolivians, Italian Brazilians, Italian Canadians, Italian Colombians, Italian Costa Ricans, Italian Cubans, Italian Dominicans, Italian Ecuadorians, Italian Guatemalans, Italian Haitians, Italian Hondurans, Italian Mexicans, Italian Panamanians, Italian Paraguayans, Italian Peruvians, Italian Puerto Ricans, Italian Salvadorans, Italian Uruguayans, Italian Venezuelans

Italian Chileans (Italian: italo-cileni; Spanish: ítalo-chilenos) are Chilean-born citizens who are fully or partially of Italian descent, whose ancestors were Italians who emigrated to Chile during the Italian diaspora, or Italian-born people in Chile. It is estimated that about 600,000 Chileans are of full or partial Italian ancestry, while Italians by birth in Chile are about 52,000. In Southern Chile, there were state-conducted Italian immigrant programs though they were not as massive as the German and Croatian immigrant programs. Families settled especially in Capitán Pastene, Angol, Lumaco, and Temuco but also in Valparaíso, Concepción, Chillán, Valdivia, and Osorno. One of the notable Italian influences in Chile is, for example, the sizable number of Italian surnames of a proportion of Chilean politicians, businessmen, and intellectuals, many of whom intermarried into the Castilian-Basque elites.

Italian Chileans, along with French Chileans, contributed to the development, cultivation and ownership of the world-famous Chilean wines from haciendas in the Central Valley, since the first wave of Italians arrived in colonial Chile in the early 19th century.

Italians in immigration to Chile have been present since the arrival of the first Spaniards into the country, such as Captain Giovanni Battista Pastene who helped Pedro de Valdivia's expedition. Thence, with akin Latin culture, Italians have helped forge the nation, with architects (Gioacchino Toesca), painters (Camilo Mori), businessmen (Anacleto Angelini), economists (Vittorio Corbo) and statesmen (Arturo Alessandri).

Since Italian immigration was never massive or organized, the only case of concerted immigration appeared in the town of Capitán Pastene, in the Araucanía Region of southern Chile, where in 1904, 23 families from Emilia-Romagna were left at their own device after being wrongfully enticed to the "riches" of Chile. Today, this small town celebrates a renaissance of their Italic heritage.

== History ==
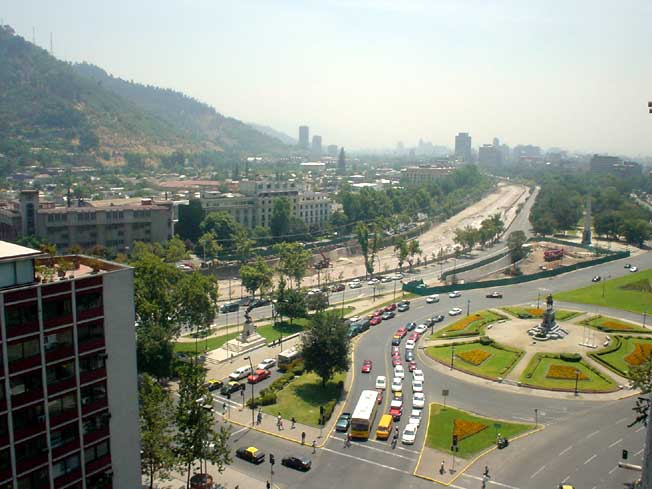
La Plaza Baquedano of Santiago is commonly called "Plaza Italia."

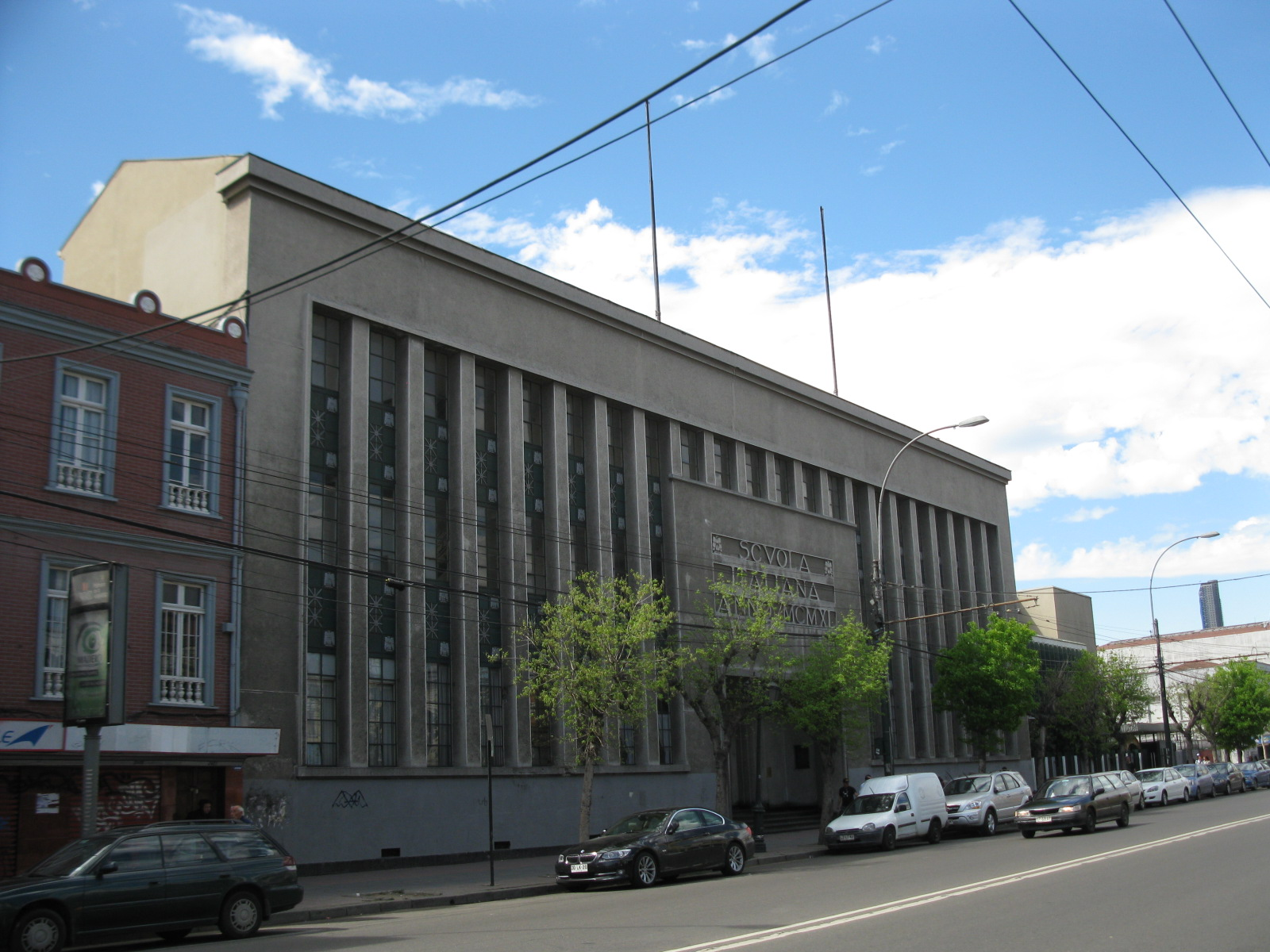
Scuola Italiana Arturo Dell' Oro, Valparaíso campus

Italian emigration in Chile was limited to a few tens of Italians during the centuries of the Spanish colony.

After independence, the Chilean government encouraged European emigration but with less success than in neighboring Argentina, given the markedly lower number of foreigners present in Chile (in 1907 the presence of foreigners in Chile was 4.5% of the population, while in Argentina it was 78%).

However, there was a substantial flow of migration from Liguria to the area of Valparaíso, which came to control 70% of the city. These immigrants founded the "Body of Fire" (called "Cristobal Colon") of the city and its "Italian School," whose building the government of Chile has declared a National Historic Monument (Spanish: "Monumento Histórico Nacional").

At the end of the 19th century, many Italian merchants were rooted in the northern part of Arica, where they began exploiting the rich mines of saltpetre. Meanwhile, many Italian families settled in the capital Santiago, Concepción and Punta Arenas.

In 1904, immigrants from Emilia brought by Giorgio Ricci founded "Nueva Italia" in Araucanía which was in 1907 renamed Capitán Pastene.

Throughout the central-southern zone of Chile, 78,740 Italians were transplanted to the early 20th century.

Some Italian-Chileans voluntarily returned to Italy, like the aviator Arturo Dell'Oro, who died in the skies of Belluno in 1917, which was head to Valparaíso one of the main Italian schools in Chile. Giulio Ravazzano (medal of honor) went back to Italy to defend his country during the Great War, to return later on where he married.

After World War I, it had exhausted major migration from Italy, and Chile currently are 339,650 Italian citizens (including those with dual passports).

Many Italian Chileans have reached positions of leadership in the society of Chile, like President Jorge Alessandri.

== Italian community ==
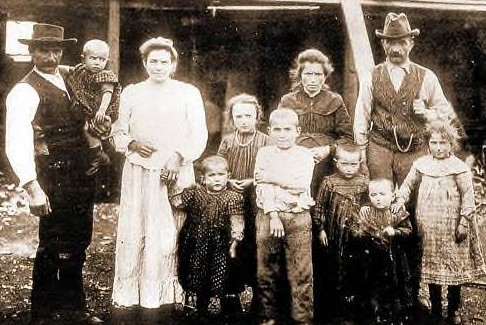
Family Castagna in 1910, who emigrated from Pavullo, Italy to Capitán Pastene

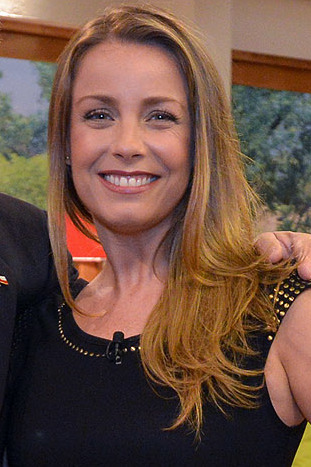
The Italian Chilean Claudia Conserva, actress and TV presenter

The Italian community has been present since the times of Giovanni Battista Pastene, who participated in the discovery of Chile to the Spanish crown in the shipment of Pedro de Valdivia.

Since then, many Italians have occupied positions of importance and married with Chileans of Spanish origin who ruled Chile; for example, the wife of Salvador Allende, the Italian Chilean Hortensia Bussi.

Former President Salvador Allende told the journalist Régis Debray that a Genovese shoemaker, Giovanni De Marchi, had a strong influence on its policy of training adolescents:

Just finished classes went to speak to this anarchist who had a great deal of influence on my life as a boy. He was sixty, or perhaps sixty years, and would chat with me. I was taught to play chess, I spoke of things of political life, and I lent books.

In 1821, the patriarch of the Alessandri family, Giuseppe Pietro Alessandri Tarzo, an Italian patriot involved in the riots of the 1820s, decided to leave Tuscany and worked as Consul of the Kingdom of Sardinia in Santiago, Chile. Among his descendants are two presidents of Chile, Arturo Alessandri (1920–1925 and 1932–1938) and Jorge Alessandri (1958–1964).

Among the Italian-Chileans are architects (as Gioacchino Toeschi), painters (as Camilo Mori), industrial (as Anacleto Angelini), actresses (like Claudia Conserva), economists (as Vittorio Corbo) and statesmen (as the President Arturo Alessandri and his son).

Italian Chileans are not one nationality, rather purely linguistic and cultural, as Italian ancestors came from various regions of the Italian-speaking area of Europe. Therefore, the descendants of Italian Croatian and Italian Swiss people (read Swiss Chilean), among others, are also counted. Included in the Italian minority are German Italians (Italian citizens of German descent and speak German language) and Arbëreshë people, the Italian-born descendants of Albanian settlers; among them are TV host and actress Cecilia Bolocco.

The Italian language is promoted by the Chilean section of Dante Alighieri, while the Italian press has with:

- La Gazzetta Italiana nel Cile, bimonthly (Santiago), director Nadir Moroso.
- Presenza, fortnightly (Providencia, 1969), publisher and editorial director Giuseppe Tommasi (Scalabrini Fathers).

There are some Italian schools in Chile (including in Santiago, the "Vittorio Montiglio" and Valparaíso, the "Arturo Dell'Oro") and some organizations protect and serve the Italian community.

=== Capitán Pastene ===
In the southern Chilean town named Capitán Pastene, there is currently a small concentration of 2,200 Italo-Chilean, who constitute almost all of the local population and maintain a few words of Italian dialect of their ancestors emigrated.

In 1904 about 100 families from the province of Modena moved there, as organized by the Chilean Government, to populate an area newly conquered by Chilean troops in their war against Mapuche tribes.

== Italian Chileans ==
- Arturo Alessandri, President of Chile (1920–1925 e 1932–1938).
- Jorge Alessandri, President of Chile (1958–1964).
- Alejandro Serani, attorney and Minister of Justice in 1937.
- Anacleto Angelini, businessman.
- Maria Ignacia Omegna, actress
- Andrés Bianchi, economist, PhD Yale University, former President of the Central Bank of Chile.
- Felipe Bianchi, sports journalist.
- Cecilia Bolocco, TV host and Miss Universe 1987.
- Diana Bolocco, TV host.
- Hortensia Bussi, wife of President Salvador Allende.
- Pedro Carcuro, sport journalist.
- Silvia "Coca" Guazzini, television, theatre and film actress.
- Claudia Conserva, actress and TV host.
- Christiane Endler, professional football athlete
- Fernando González, tennis player and Olympic medalist.
- Soledad Onetto, journalist and TV host.
- Manuel Pellegrini, football manager and former footballer.
- Aldo Schiappacasse, sports journalist.
- Cristopher Toselli, football player.
- Humberto Trucco, President of the Supreme Court of Chile (1934–1937 e 1944–1950).
- Manuel Trucco, politician and Vicepresident of Chile (1931).
- Fabio Vio, Ambassador of Chile to Peru (2008–2014).

== See also ==
- Chile-Italy relations
- Audax Italiano
- Barrio Italia
