= Immigration to Chile =

Immigration to Chile has contributed to the demographics and the history of this South American nation. Chile is a country whose inhabitants are mainly of Spain (mostly of Andalusian and Basque origin) and Native American, mostly descended from Mapuche peoples. During the 19th and 20th centuries, Europeans, mainly Spanish, Germans, British, French, Southern Slavs, and Italians, immigrated to Chile. The inflow was much smaller than those to Argentina, Uruguay and Brazil, meaning that it was significantly less impactful. At the same time, some separate cultural aspects, such as German cakes, British afternoon tea, and Italian pasta, were preserved. The fusion is also visible in the architecture of Chilean cities. This intermarriage and mixture of cultures and races have shaped the present society and culture of Chile.

Settlers from Europe came from France, Great Britain, Italy, Germany, and Croatia, among others. Although significant numbers of Palestinians, Syrians, and Lebanese also arrived. Today, most immigrants come from other American countries. The largest immigrant group comes from Venezuela, followed by Peru, Haiti, Colombia, Bolivia and Argentina. One of the main factors that has driven this migration has been the country's relatively stable political history, compared with the rest of Latin America and the significant growth of the Chilean economy in recent decades.

== Immigration and diasporas in Chile ==
Country of origin	Recent immigrants, (INE-DEM, 2019)	Descendants of old immigrants	Time of greatest immigration	Reference: Immigrants or descendants
Venezuela	700,000	—	S.21	Ministerio del Interior, 2024.
Peru	235,165	—	S.20—S.21	Departamento de Extranjería y Migración, (INE-DEM, 2019).
Haiti	185,865	—	S.21	Departamento de Extranjería y Migración, (INE-DEM, 2019).
Colombia	161,153	—	S.21	Departamento de Extranjería y Migración, (INE-DEM, 2019).
Bolivia	120,103	—	S.20—S.21	Departamento de Extranjería y Migración, (INE-DEM, 2019).
Argentina	79,474	—	S.19—S.21	Departamento de Extranjería y Migración, (INE-DEM, 2019).
Ecuador	41,403	—	S.20—S.21	Departamento de Extranjería y Migración, (INE-DEM, 2019).
Spain	22,524	—	S.16—S.18	Departamento de Extranjería y Migración, (INE-DEM, 2019).
Dominican Republic	20,080	—	S.21	Departamento de Extranjería y Migración, (INE-DEM, 2019).
Brazil	19,980	—	—	Departamento de Extranjería y Migración, (INE-DEM, 2019).
United States	18,477	—	—	Departamento de Extranjería y Migración, (INE-DEM, 2019).
Cuba	16,253	—	S.20	Departamento de Extranjería y Migración, (INE-DEM, 2019).
Mexico	10,380	—	—	Departamento de Extranjería y Migración, (INE-DEM, 2019).
Paraguay	5,987	6,500	—	Departamento de Extranjería y Migración, (INE-DEM, 2019), y Secretaría de Repatriados de Paraguay.
Other countries	51,918	—	—	Departamento de Extranjería y Migración, (INE-DEM, 2019).
France	10,520	800,000	S.19—S.20	R. Parvex, Hommes and Migrations, 2014.
United Kingdom	—	700,000	S.19—S.20	Embajada Británica en Chile, según Proyecto Biografía de Chile, 2012.
Italy	6,075	600,000	S.19—S.20	R. Parvex, Hommes and Migrations, 2014.
Germany	9,689	500,000	S.19—S.20	Cámara Chileno-Alemana de Comercio, según DW.
Palestine	—	500,000	S.19—S.20	Up to 61% of chilean-arabs. International Business Times, 2013.
Croatia	—	400,000	S.19—S.20	Corporación Cultural Chileno-Croata Domovina, 2015.
Syria	—	200,000	S.19—S.20	25% of chilean-arabs. Datos cruzados de EPOA, 2001; en J. Córdoba-Toro, 2015; e International Business Times, 2013.
Jewish	—	175,000	S.19—S.20	Presidencia de la Comunidad Judía en Chile, según EFE, 2010; H. Harvey, 2012.
Portugal	—	174,000	S.16—S.18	1% of chilean surnames. L. Thayer, 1989.
Ireland	—	120,000	S.19—S.20	O'Higgins Tours, 2010.
Greece	—	100,000	S.19—S.20	R. Parvex, Hommes and Migrations, 2014.
Switzerland	—	100,000	S.19—S.20	Embajada Suiza e Inst. Cultural de Providencia, 2010; J. Córdoba-Toro, 2018; Swiss Federal Council, 2019.
Netherlands	—	50,000	S.19—S.20	—
Lebanon	—	32,000	S.19—S.20	4% of chilean-arabs. EPOA, 2001; e International Business Times, 2013.
Serbia	—	30,000	S.19—S.20	5% of Yugoslav immigration, in relation to the remaining 95% corresponding to Croatian immigration.
Romani	—	20,000	S.20	H. Marsh, University of East Anglia, 2016.
China	15,696	20,000	S.20	Departamento de Extranjería y Migración, (INE-DEM, 2019), y La Tercera.
Poland	—	10,000	S.19—S.20	Stowarzyszenie Wspólnota Polska, 2007.
Sweden	—	5,000	S.21	Svenskar i Världen, 2022.
Japan	—	3,000	S.20	Gobierno de Japón, 2017.
South Korea	—	2,700	S.20	Diario La segunda, 2014.
Hungary	—	2,000	S.20	Nemzetpolitikai Kutatóintézet, según Programa Kőrösi Csoma Sándor, 2015.
Total	1,625,074 (2022)	—	—	Ministerio del Interior, 2024.

== Immigration from Europe ==
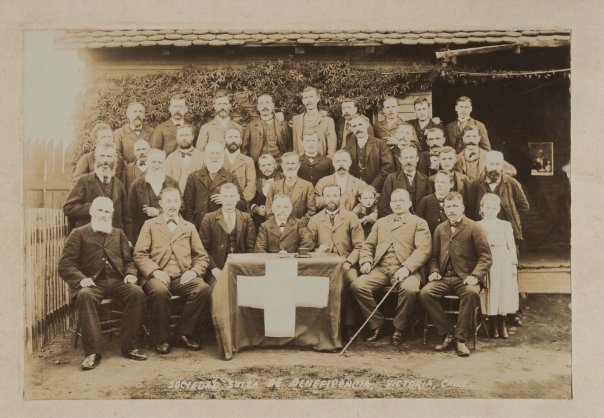
Swiss Charitable Society of Victoria, year 1886.

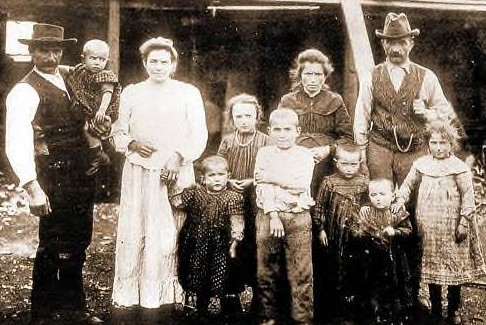
One of the Italian settler families who founded Capitán Pastene, year 1910.

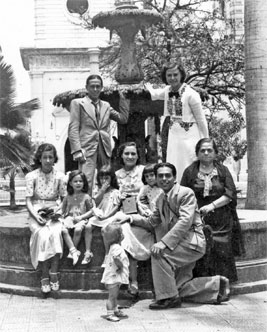
French family in Chile, year 1920.

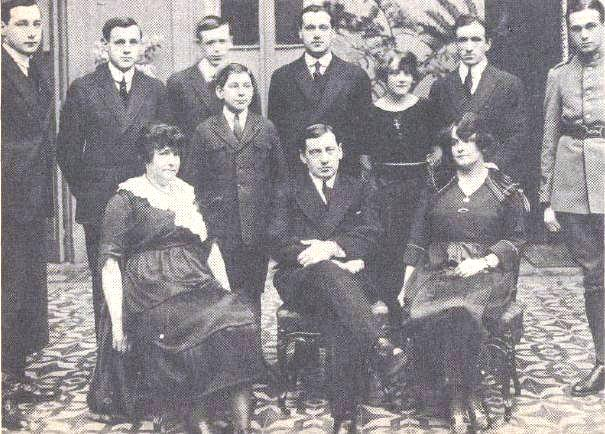
Alessandri Family, with two future presidents of Chile, year 1920.

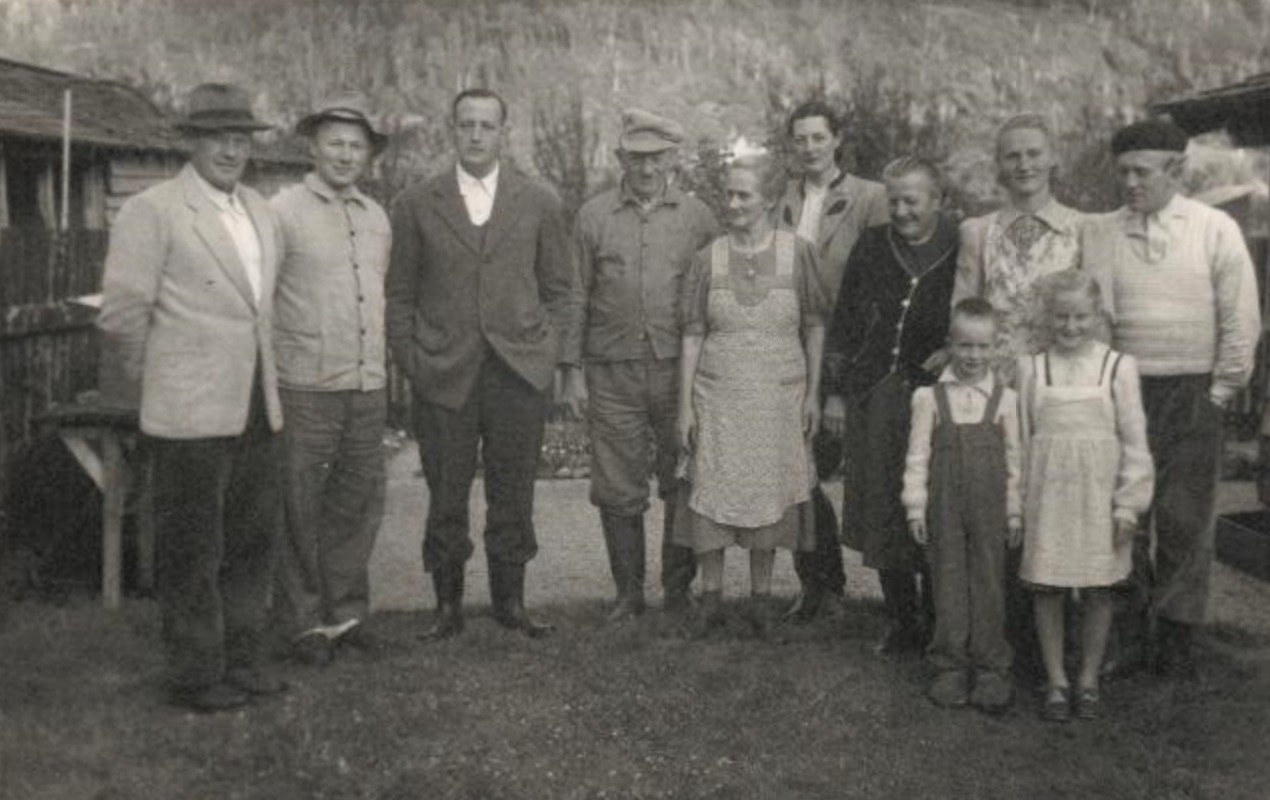
Family of German colonists, in the agricultural expansion in Aysén, year 1951.
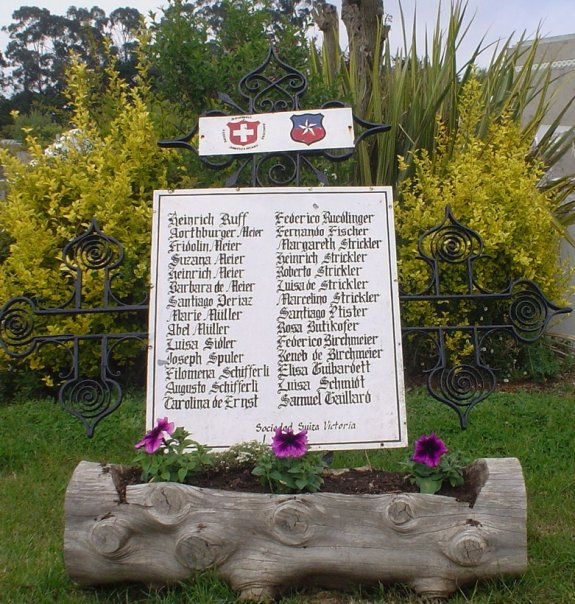
Plaque of the Swiss Cemetery, located in Victoria, Araucanía Region.

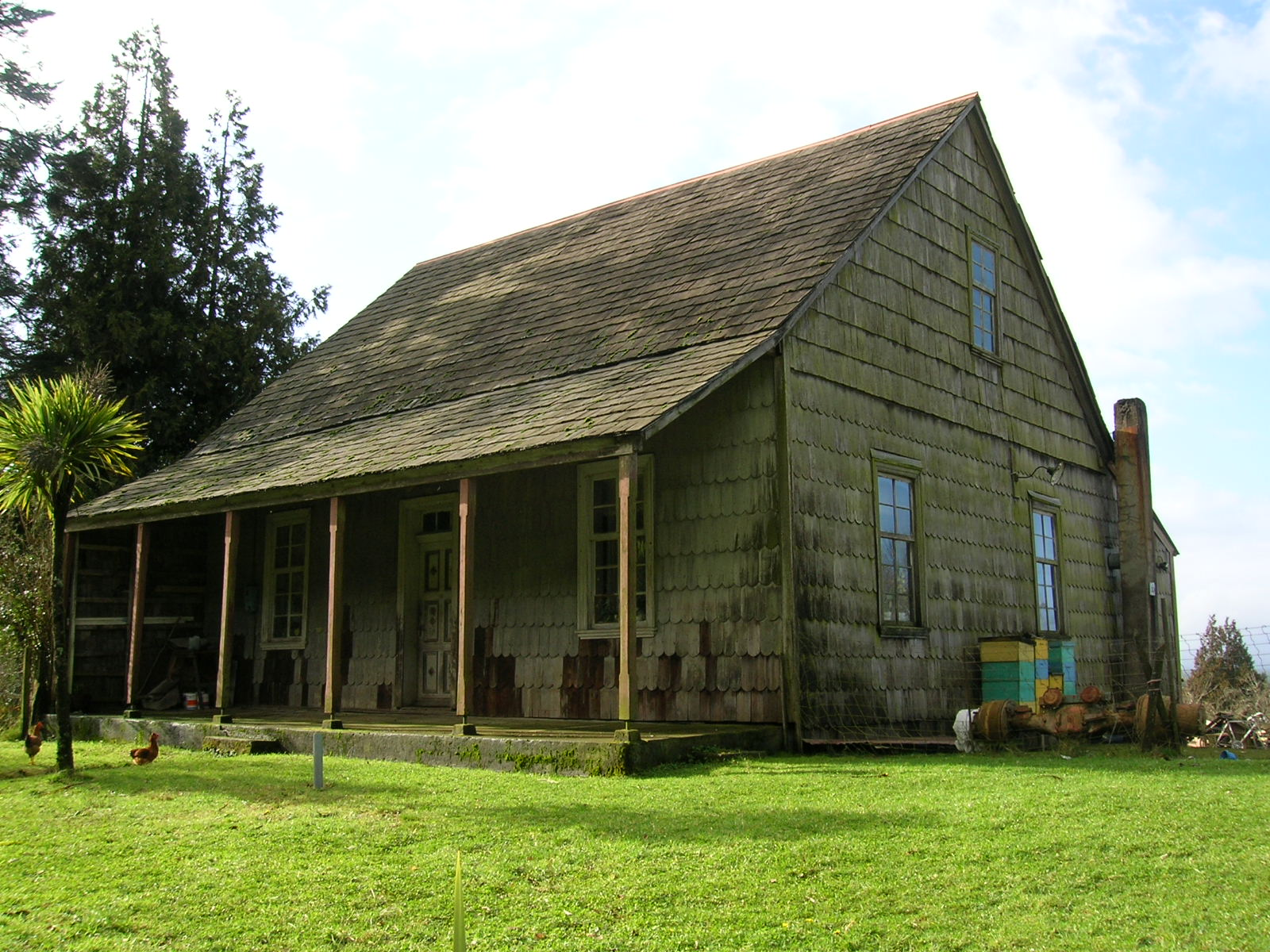
Typical house of German settlers in southern Chile, in Los Ríos and Los Lagos regions.

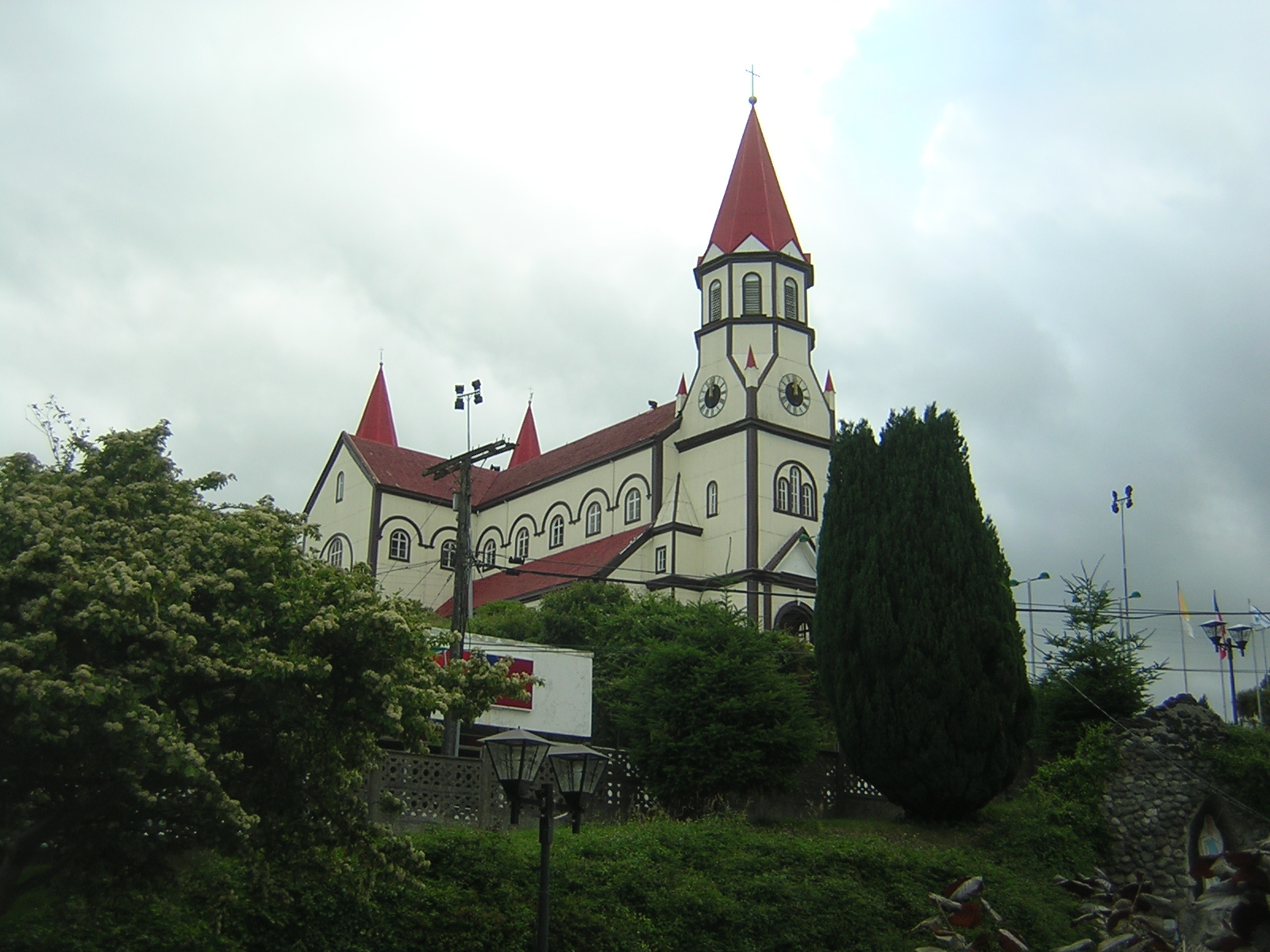
German-style parish church in Puerto Varas, Los Lagos Region.

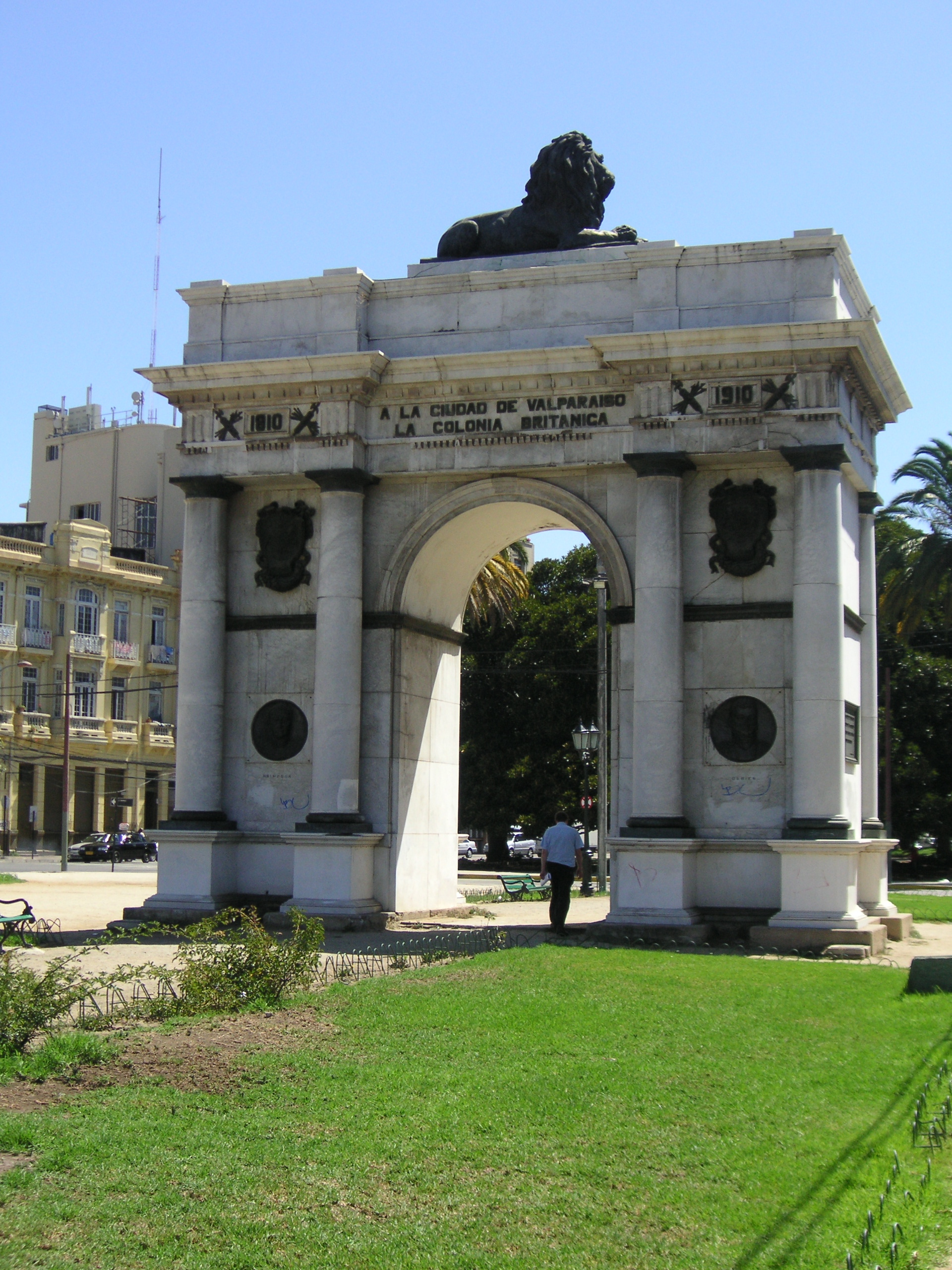
British Arch, located in the city of Valparaíso.

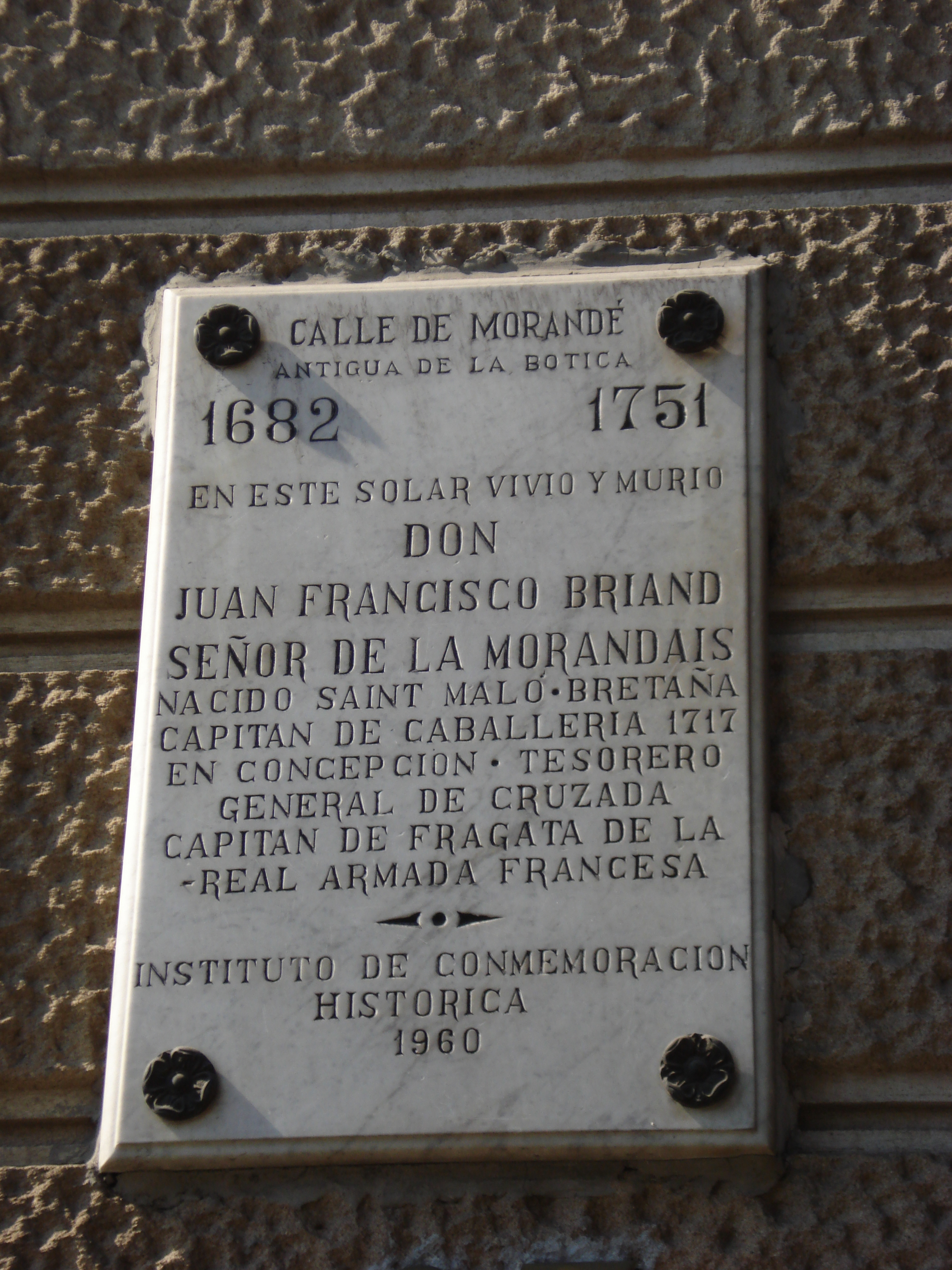
Plaque in the house of the French immigrant Morandais, origin of the Chilean surname Morandé.

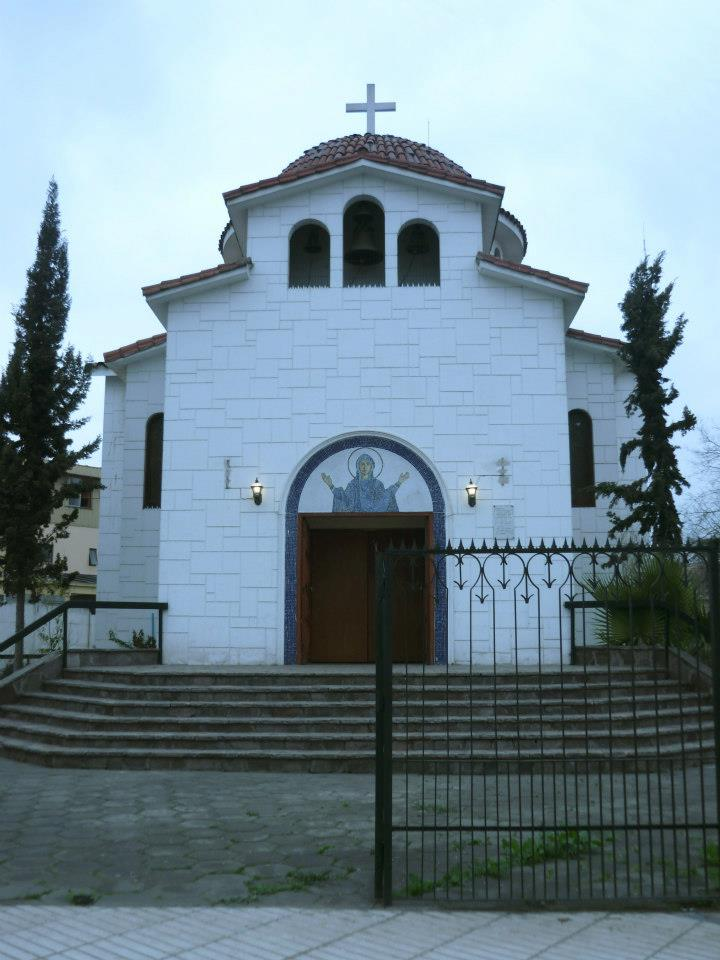
Greek Orthodox Church of the Saints Constantine and Elena, located in the commune of Ñuñoa, Santiago.

Spaniards were the most relevant group among European immigration to Chile. The largest ethnic group in Chile arrived from Spain during the colonial age, prior to 1810. Too, until the 18th century, the country experienced massive immigration from the Basque Country and Navarre, reaching 27% of the total Chilean colonial population, as well as Portuguese and Italian immigrants who accompanied the Spanish Empire. The situation changed for the early 20th century Chile was not a particularly attractive destination for migrants simply because it was far from Europe, and reaching such a remote place was difficult. A situation recognized in the census of 1907, census which recorded the percentage of Europeans versus the total population of Chile (2.2%). In other counts, with only immigrants born in their countries of origin, and without counting their descendants, came to represent 4.1% of the national population, with the exception of Magallanes Region, where 1/4 people had been born abroad, mostly on the European continent.

However, some relevant groups arrived anyway, especially for the colonization of Araucanía, and in search of luck in mining activity in the north of the country. In any case, this immigration does not compare to that of the South American Atlantic countries. Between 1851 and 1924 Chile only received the 0.5% of the European immigration flow to Latin America, against 46% of Argentina, 33% of Brazil, 14% of Cuba, and 4% of Uruguay. This was because most of the migration occurred across the Atlantic, not the Pacific, and that this migration occurred mostly before the construction of the Panama Canal. Also, Europeans preferred to stay in countries closer to their homelands instead of taking that long tour across the Straits of Magellan or crossing the Andes.

Although the majority of European immigrants during the first half of the 20th century came from Spain and Italy, others came in smaller numbers from other European countries including the Caucasus. Jews arrived in the early part of the 20th century, fleeing pogroms in Russia and in the mid-20th century from Poland, Hungary, Romania, and the former nations of Yugoslavia and Czechoslovakia, also Germany, fleeing the Nazis in the 1930s and Communism in the 1950s.

=== Spain ===
Clearly, Spanish immigration was the most important during the colonial period. Since Chile became an independent republic, Spanish immigration is estimated at 40,000 people settling between 1880 and 1940. The Spanish Civil War spurred some 3,000 people to immigrate to Chile at the end of the 1930s, primarily being Catalan and Basque. The majority embarked for Chile on the ship Winnipeg thanks to Pablo Neruda, the Chilean delegate sent to France to take care of the pertinent negotiations. Almost 11,000 Spaniards also arrived in Araucanía between 1883 and 1901, after the Occupation of Araucanía. These colonists were given lands in the Chilean Central Valley and their descendants are principally found in Temuco, Concepción, and Ercilla. In 1903, a fleet of 88 Canarian families—400 persons—arrived in Budi Lake, Chile, that currently have more than 1,000 descendants, as a response to the government's call to populate this region and signed contracts for the benefit of a private company. While many Canarians obeyed their service, some of those who disobeyed the provisions of repopulation tried to escape their service and were arrested, and the indigenous Mapuche people took pity on the plight of these Canarians who were established on their former lands. The Mapuches welcomed them and joined their demonstrations in the so-called "revolt of the Canarians", and many Canarians integrated into Mapuche population to add the large mestizo population that exists in Chile.

Today, the Spanish colony continues to be the most significant in the country, having its own football (soccer) club, Unión Española and more than 80 institutions of varying purpose throughout Chile (charitable, sports, philanthropic, social, etc.). It is estimated that some 400,000 Chileans are descendants of Spanish immigrants who came to Chile during the 20th century, more than 100,000 descending from the Spanish who settled in Araucanía.

=== Basque ===
Estimates of the number of Chileans with Basque ancestry currently range from 10% (1,600,000) to as high as 27% (4,700,000). The Basque community in Chile is large, visible, and has existed since the 16th century. Basque immigration can be divided into historical periods: the discovery, foundation, and colonial period; the wave of immigration in the 18th century; and the recent immigration period (19th and 20th centuries). A substantial number of traders from the Basque country arrived between 1750 and 1800. These Basque immigrants prospered and married the daughters of the old commissioned officers who came originally from the south of Spain, making them landlords of economic, social, and political power, which has given them a certain preeminence.

The Basque presence in Chile began in the conquistador period. A contingent from the Basque Provinces, including Navarra, was part of the original Spanish army. In the 16th century, of the 157 families from the Iberian Peninsula that settled in Chile, 39 had Basque surnames. The number grew steadily, and many Chilean governors have been of Basque origin.

During the 18th century, Chile saw a mass immigration coming from the Basque country. By the end of the 18th century, Chileans with Basque surnames comprised 27% of the Chilean population. Basques became the most important regional group in the population, displacing both the native population and descendants of those born in New Castile, Old Castile, and Andalucía. These immigrant families initially dedicated themselves to their preferred forms of business, and in successive years entered into many alliances with families of Castilian origin possessing lands and titles, giving birth to a new social group known in Chilean history as the "Castilian-Basque Aristocracy."

In the second half of the 19th century came a new wave of Basque immigration, with as many from the French Basque country as from the Spanish Basque country. The migratory flood continued, with varying intensity, almost until the end of the Spanish Civil War.

To describe the Basque-Chilean relationship, Miguel de Unamuno, himself of Basque ancestry, said: "There are at least two things that clearly can be attributed to Basque ingenuity: the Society of Jesus and the Republic of Chile."

=== France ===
960,000 are the descendants of French in Chile today. The French came to Chile in the 18th century, arriving at Concepción as merchants, and in the mid-19th century to cultivate vines in the haciendas of the Central Valley, the homebase of world-famous Chilean wine. The Araucanía Region also has an important number of people of French ancestry, as the area hosted settlers arrived by the second half of the 19th century as farmers and shopkeepers. With akin Latin culture, the French immigrants quickly assimilated into mainstream Chilean society.

By 1854 there were 1654 Frenchmen in Chile, by 1895 it rose to 8266; about 80% of them arrived from Southwestern France, especially from Basses-Pyrénées (Basque country and Béarn), Gironde, Charente-Inférieure and Charente and regions situated between Gers and Dordogne.

In World War II, a group of over 10,000 Chileans of French descent, the majority have French relatives joined the Free French Forces and fought the Nazi occupation of France. The incumbent Chilean President, Michelle Bachelet is of French origin. Former dictator, Augusto Pinochet, is another Chilean of French descent. A large percentage of politicians, businessmen, professionals and entertainers in the country are of French ancestry.

=== Germany ===
According to the last census and estimations, year 2019, 9,689 German immigrants resided in Chile at that time, and their descendants are to be 1,000,000 people. The origin of the massive immigration of Germans (includes Poles due to Partitions of Poland, German-speaking Swiss, Silesians, Alsatians, Austrians, and Sudeten Germans) to Chile is found in the so-called "Law of Selective Immigration" of 1845. The "law's" objective was to bring middle and upper-class people to colonize regions in the south of Chile, between Valdivia and Puerto Montt. More than 6,000 families arrived in Chile during this period alone.

The German immigrants succeeded in creating vigorous villages and communities in virtually uninhabited regions, completely changing the landscape of the southern zones. Carlos Anwandter left evidence of this great spirit of building, proclaiming to all the colonists: "We will be Chileans, as honorable and hardworking as ever there were, we will defend our adopted country united in the ranks of our new compatriots, against all foreign oppression and with the resolve and fortitude of the man that defends his country, his family, and his interests. This country that we have adopted as sons will never have reason to repent of its enlightened, humane, and generous gesture..." (18 November 1851).

Later years brought a new, great wave of German immigrants who settled throughout the country, especially in Temuco, Santiago, and in the country's principal commercial zones. During World War II, many German Jews settled in Chile, fleeing the Holocaust. After the war, many leaders and collaborators from Nazi Germany sought to take refuge in the southern region of the country. Paul Schäfer even founded Colonia Dignidad (Dignity Colony), a German enclave in Region VII, where massive human rights violations were carried out.

Among many distinguished descendants of the Germans in Chile are counted the commander Fernando Matthei Aubel, the architect Mathias Klotz, tennis players Gabriel Silberstein and Hans Gildemeister, golf players Joaquín Niemann and Felipe Aguilar, the athletes Sebastián Keitel and Marlene Ahrens Ostertag and her daughter, TV host and journalist Karin Ebensperger, the musicians Patricio Manns and Emilio Körner, the economist Ernesto Schiefelbein, the politicians Miguel Kast and Evelyn Matthei, the entrepreneurs Jürgen Paulmann and Carlos Heller, the painters Uwe Grumann and Rossy Ölckers, television presenters Karen Doggenweiler, Allison Göhler, and Margot Kahl, writers César Müller and Mexican-born Beatriz Gutiérrez Müller, and the actors Gloria Münchmeyer and her daughter Catalina Guerra, Antonia Zegers, Aline Kuppenheim, and Bastian Bodenhofer.

It is now difficult to tabulate the full number of German descendants in Chile because of the large amount of time that has passed and because they have mixed with the Chilean population for more than 150 years. Because many areas of the Chilean South are sparsely populated, the traces of German immigration are rather obvious that the German culture is well preserved. In reality, the descendants of these first immigrants mostly live in the big cities.

=== Britain and Ireland ===
British descendants in Chile are estimated to number between 350,000 and 420,000 to 700,000; with 120,000 Irish-Chileans. The English, Welsh, Scottish, and Irish population rose to more than 32,000 during the port of Valparaíso's boom period at the end of the 19th and beginning of the 20th century during the saltpeter bonanza. The role of British colonial influence is important to understanding the boom and bust of the port of Valparaíso.

The English immigration and influence was also important in the northern regions of the country during the saltpeter boom, in the ports of Iquique and Pisagua. The King of Saltpeter, John Thomas North, was the principal backer of nitrate mining. The British legacy is reflected in the street names of the historic district of the city of Iquique, and the foundation of various institutions, such as the Club Hípico (Racing Club). Nevertheless, British influence came to an end with the saltpeter crisis during the 1930s.

Today the descendants of British and Irish immigrants are found dispersed throughout the country. Well-known descendants of these colonists include Patricio Aylwin, Gustavo Leight, Alberto Blest Gana, Joaquín Edwards, Carlos Condell de la Haza, Juan Williams, Patricio Lynch Solo de Zaldívar, Jorge O'Ryan, Benjamín Vicuña MacKenna, Bernardo Leighton, Enrique Mac Iver, Bernardo O'Higgins, José Manuel "Rojo" Edwards, Emilio Edwards, Rodrigo Millar, Solange Lackington, Olivia Collins, and Sussan Taunton.

=== Croatia ===
One of the most important groups of European immigrants in Chile are the Croats, whose number of descendants today (2009) is estimated to be 500,000 persons, the equivalent of 3% of the population. Other authors claim, on the other hand, that close to 4.6% of the Chilean population must have some Croatian ancestry. Chile is the second-ranked country in the world for number of Croatian descendants, after Croatia itself.

The first Croatian immigrants came from Dalmatia, arriving in the mid-19th century in escape from the wars unleashed in that region or from pestilence on the islands in the Adriatic Sea. The major concentrations of Croatians can be found in Santiago, Antofagasta, and Punta Arenas, but a large concentration also exists in Viña del Mar, Porvenir, and La Serena. Many descendants of Croatian immigrants who settled in the north and south of Chile later moved to the capital.

Arturo Givovich is considered to be the first Croatian in Chile, having arrived in the 17th century on an English pirate ship belonging to Sir Francis Drake. Givovich jumped ship in Chile, abandoning the Navy and staying on land for the sake of love. In the mid-19th century, three sailors from the Dalmatian-Croatian coast—Antonio Letic, Antonion Zupicic, and Esteban Costa (Kosta)—were hired by the Chilean Navy and sent to the Straits of Magellan. They arrived in October 1843, with a relief and resupply mission for Fort Búlnes, which had been erected only months before.

Without a doubt, most Croatian immigrants, approximately 58,000, arrived in Chile at the end of the 19th century and the beginning of the 20th, up until World War I. Consequently, the Croatian colony in Chile was officially considered Austro-Hungarian.

The Croatian immigrants dedicated themselves to business. In Punta Arenas, they dedicated themselves to the estates, or the extraction of gold, primarily found in Cañón Baquedano. In the north of Chile, they dedicated themselves to mining saltpeter. Various institutions created by the Croatian colony have persisted, including clubs, schools, stadiums, gymnasiums, and charity institutions. The cities of Punta Arenas and Antofagasta are sister cities of the city of Split in Dalmatia.

Croatian immigration in Punta Arenas was crucial to the development of Magallanes and the city in particular. Currently, you can see their legacy in the names of shops and many buildings. According to some references, up to 50% of the population of Punta Arenas are descendants of Croats.

=== Italy ===
In 1989, the estimated number of people of Italian descent in Chile was 300,000 persons. After independence, the Chilean government encouraged Italian emigration especially after the formation of the Kingdom of Italy in the 1860s and 1870s, but without getting the results from the nearby Argentina.

However, there was a substantial flow of migration from Liguria to the area of Valparaíso, which came to control 70% of the city. These immigrants founded the 'Body of Fire' (called Cristóforo Colombo) of the city and its Scuola Italiana, whose building has been declared by the Government of Chile "Monumento Histórico Nacional".

In comparison, larger numbers of Italian immigrants to Chile were from the Northern Italian regions such as Liguria, Emilia-Romagna, Piedmont and Lombardy and to a much smaller number of Central or Southern. Italian Chileans along with French Chileans contributed to the development, cultivation and ownership of the world-famous Chilean wines from haciendas in the Central Valley ever since the first wave of Italians arrived in colonial Chile in the early 19th century. With akin Latin culture, the Italian settlers, along with French, quickly assimilated into mainstream Chilean society.

At the end of the 19th century many Italian merchants are rooted in the northern part of Arica, where they began exploiting the rich mines of saltpetre. Meanwhile, many Italian families settled in the capital Santiago, Concepción, Viña del Mar, La Serena and Punta Arenas.

Although being just a fraction of the size of the migration to Argentina, Italian immigration to Chile has been present since the arrival of the first Spaniards into the country, like captain Giovanni Battista Pastene who helped Pedro de Valdivia's expedition. Thence, with akin Latin culture, Italians have helped forge the nation, with architects (Gioacchino Toesca), painters (Camilo Mori), businessmen (Anacleto Angelini), Economists (Vittorio Corbo) and statesmen (Arturo Alessandri) among others.

=== Greece ===
The Greek community in Chile are estimated to number 150,000, and reside either in the Santiago area or in the Antofagasta area, mostly. Chile is one of the 5 countries with the most descendants of Greeks in the world.

The Greek community has great importance in Chile. The first immigrants arrived during the 16th century from Crete, so named "Candia" in honor of the island's capital, the current Heraklion. The surname, although at present, is very disconnected from its ancient origins. The majority of Greek immigrants arrived in Chile at the beginning of century, some as part of their spirit of adventure and escape from the rigors of the World War and the catastrophe of Smyrna in Asia Minor, although many Greeks had already settled in Antofagasta, a city in northern Chile, including crews of the ships commanded by Arturo Prat for the Pacific War (1879–1883) in naval battle of Iquique (boatswain Constantine Micalvi). It is very likely that the good climate of the area has been a major attraction for immigrants Greeks. However, the chronicles of the time show that most attracted by the reputation he had acquired the northern Chilean operation of salt and the wealth they had in the country. According to El Mercurio of Antofagasta, between the years 1920 and 1935 there were about 4,000 Greeks in the city and other 3,000 in offices saltpeter.

The majority of Greek immigrants arrived in Chile at the beginning of the 20th century for his spirit adventurer. However, the chronicles of the time show that most attracted by the reputation he had acquired the north by the operation of nitrate. The country was plunging into an economic boom that lasted a very large period in which the Chileans did not pay taxes. Salitre fever attracted thousands of foreigners who came from Europe and some of the United States. The "nitrate" or city offices located close to the mineral operations were a glorious time. Furniture, curtains, carpets were imported from France or England and foreigners also imported European governesses to educate their shoots.

Amid this flood of foreigners who populated northern Chilean appeared Greece. Was a numerous Collectivité Hellenic whose records were listed in two sources. One of these was the extensive collaboration that gave the Chilean press through its pages in the newspaper El Mercurio. The other end of the fire under the rubble of the first home that housed the proto-Hellenes of Chile.

In 1926 the first women's association for excellence, filóptoxos (friends of the poor) which was chaired by Xrisí Almallotis. Since then to date there have been about four or five generations of descendants of Greeks. Some have moved south and are grouped mainly in Santiago and Valparaíso. Others returned to the motherland after the first war but most of the immigrants stayed in their new country and founded numerous Greek-Chilean families. The main member of this community the employer is Constantino Kochifas, owner of the ships Skorpios in Puerto Montt.

=== Switzerland ===
There are currently 5,000 Swiss citizens residing in Chile, and 130,000 Swiss descendants, of whom 60,000 are from colonizations sponsored by the State of Chile in the 19th century, and another 30,000 are emigrants during World War I and II.

The number of Swiss in Chile seems larger than it actually is. This is because Swiss linguistic and cultural characteristics are commonly confused with those of Germans, Italians and French. Swiss migration to Chile took place at the end of the 19th century, between 1883 and 1900, particularly to the area of Araucanía, especially to Victoria and Traiguén. It is estimated that more than 8,000 Swiss families received grants of land.

In the 19th century, the opening up of new lands in the New World and the economic crisis in Europe motivated the most impoverished sectors of society to emigrate, mainly to United States in North America, to Australia, and to Brazil, Uruguay, Argentina and Chile in South America. It was an organized exodus of limited duration. As economic immigration increased, the State assumed a regulatory role by granting or denying requests for permission to settle there.

Formal reports of Swiss immigrants' experiences in southern Chile began in 1853. Official reports of the Swiss Consulate in Valparaíso highlighted the advantages and disadvantages that Chile offered to migrants from Europe. Around 1884, the Chilean Government invited citizens from various European countries to settle in supposedly "pacified" southern territories in Araucania, where the first Swiss, French and German settlers continued to be harassed by the hosts commanded by the mapuche leader Colipi until 1889.

The procedure was as follows: the settlers were met by government authorities at Talca, held in quarantine, and then taken to Angol, where each family received farming tools and a cart with oxen to travel to the "promised land." In one documented case, in the town of Puren, each family was freely assigned 40 hectares, plus other 20 hectares for each son capable of working those lands. In addition, each family received a subsidy of 15 pesos per month and one milking cow. In turn, the family had to undertake to live in their allocated plot, fence it, build a home and work it directly.

Only 28 years after the commencement of German colonization in southern Chile, the Federal Council in 1881 authorized specialized agencies to operate in Switzerland to recruit migrants. The Federal Council, after years of examining the advantages and disadvantages to admitting migrants, posed as a premise the assumption that the Chilean authorities insisted on peace in Araucanía, which had not yet been fully accomplished. The first contingent departed Switzerland in November 1883. Subsequent authorizations would depend on its success. The first group was composed of 1311 families who landed in a Chilean port 19 December 1883. Between 1883 and 1886 12,602 people, representing 7% of emigration from Switzerland overseas, traveled to the territory of Araucanía . The operations continued until 1890, when it was recorded that 22,708 Swiss had come to the heart of the Araucania. Between 1915 and 1950, after the last recorded mass exodus of Swiss to Chile 30,000 residents were found to be installed in the central area of the country, primarily in Santiago and Valparaíso.

=== Netherlands ===
In 1600, the Chilean city of Valdivia was conquered by Dutch pirate Sebastian de Cordes. He left the city after some months. Then in 1642 the VOC and the WIC sent a fleet of ships to Chile to conquer the city of Valdivia and seize the goldmines of the Spanish. The expedition was conducted by Hendrik Brouwer, a Dutch general. In 1643 Brouwer conquered the Chiloé Archipelago and the city of Valdivia. Brouwer died on 7 August 1643, and the vice-general Elias Herckmans took control.

The second emigration from the Netherlands to Chile came in 1895. Under the so-called "Inspector General of Colonization and Chilean Immigration" a dozen Dutch families settled between 1895 and 1897 in Chiloé, particularly in Mechaico, Huillinco and Chacao. In the same period Hageman Egbert arrived in Chile. with his family, 14 April 1896, settling in Rio Gato, near Puerto Montt. The Wennekool family came to Chile and inaugurated the Dutch colonization of Villarrica.

In the early 20th century, a large group of Dutch people, known as Boers, arrived in Chile from South Africa and worked mainly in construction of the railway. The Boer War would eventually lead in 1902 to the British annexation of both the Dutch and British colonies. Some of the Boers, also called Afrikaners decided to return to Europe, many of them after a long stay in British camps. Shortly after their return to the Netherlands, some were presented with the opportunity to immigrate to Chile with the help of the Chilean government.

On 4 May 1903, a group of over 200 Dutch emigrants sailed on the steamship "Oropesa," of the "Pacific Steam Navigation Company," from La Rochelle (La Pallice) in France. The majority of migrants were born in the Netherlands: 35% were from North Holland and South Holland, 13% from North Brabant, 9% from Zeeland and another 9% from Gelderland. Only a dozen children had been born in South Africa (in Pretoria, Johannesburg, Valkrust, Roode Koog, Muurfontein, Platrand, Watersaltoon and Cape Town/Kaapstad). Among the emigrants was a small group of singles, but most were married couples with children (some had as many as five children).

On 5 June, they traveled by train to their final destination, the city of Pitrufquén, located south of Temuco, near the hamlet of Donguil. Another group of Dutch emigres arrived shortly after in Talcahuano, aboard the "Oravi" and the "Orissa". The Dutch colony in Donguil was christened "Colonia Nueva Transvala" or "New Transvaal Colony". Between 7 February 1907 and 18 February 1909, more than 500 families eventually settled in Chile to start a new life.

It is currently estimated that there are about 105,000 Chileans of Dutch descent in Chile, mostly located in Malleco, Gorbea, Pitrufquén, Faja Maisan and around Temuco.

=== Hungary ===
In South America, more Hungarians settled in Argentina and Brazil. But Chile was a major point of passage for Hungarians to other countries in North America (the United States or Canada) and Australia. Most Hungarian immigrants to Australia came from South America during the first half of the 20th century. According to 2001 census estimates, there are around 40,000 people of Hungarian descent living in Chile, the main concentration are in Santiago.

=== Lithuania ===
After the Nazi German occupation and Soviet annexation of the Baltic States when WWII ended, tens of thousands of Lithuanians and Latvians fled Communist Soviet rule to Chile. They managed to prosper and preserve Baltic culture, when their homelands struggled to break free from Russia by 1990.

=== Poland ===
A small number of Poles came to Chile, with first of them coming during the Napoleonic Wars. In the early 20th century, there were around 300 Poles in Chile. After World War II, around 1,500 Poles, mostly former Zivilarbeiter (forced laborers in Nazi Germany), settled in Chile, and in 1949 the Association of Poles in Chile was founded. A significant majority of Polish Chileans live in Santiago. One of the notable Polish Chileans is Ignacy Domeyko.

=== Russia ===
According to the 2001 Chilean Census, about 5,500 Russians live in the country, but other demographic estimates of Chileans with Russian descent climb to over 60,000. It included Poles due to Partitions of Poland.

The first Russians came to Chile in the early 19th century as part of naval expeditions circumnavigating the globe, among them captains Otto Kotsebu, Fyodor Litke, and Vasili Golovnin. However, they were just temporary visitors; the earliest Russian migrants came in 1854. The immigrants of that time belonged to different ethnic groups of the Russian Empire, particularly to minorities. Among them were seafarers and traders as well as medical professionals such as Alexei Sherbakov, who served as a surgeon in the Chilean Navy during the War of the Pacific. In the period between World War I and World War II, political motivations for migration came to the forefront; the number of White Russian emigres in Chile grew to about 90%. In the 1950s, their numbers were further bolstered by arrivals from among the Russian expatriate community in Harbin. The Russian Cemetery was founded in 1954 to provide a separate space for burials for the community.

== Immigration from the Americas ==
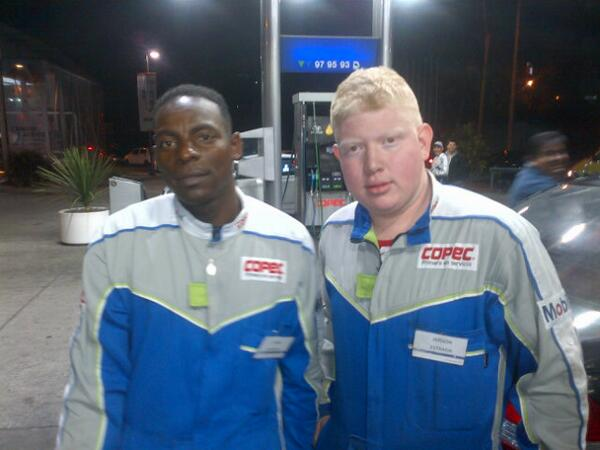
Immigration has made of Chile a more ethnically diverse country.

Though during all its history, Chile has received immigrants from other American countries. The economic and political stability of the last decade has been one of the determinant factors in the growing entrance of immigrants of said origin to the country. Although the majority come from Argentina and Peru due to those countries' proximity, a good number of Bolivians, Ecuadorians, Colombians, Brazilians, Venezuelans, Mexicans, Canadians, Central Americans (mostly Nicaraguans and Salvadorans), Uruguayans, Caribbean islanders (recently the small wave of Haitians) and Paraguayans. Also United States citizens have entered. They have found reception in the country, being employed in diverse branches of the Chilean economic task.

=== Argentina ===
Argentine immigration is a longstanding phenomenon that goes back to Chilean independence and the time of the Army of the Andes. The first Argentines arrived when the Organization of the Republic of Chile was launched in 1823 after Independence, as was the case with both Manuel Blanco Encalada and Bartolomé Mitre. The Argentine community has always been important. In the mid-1990s, when the first symptoms of the Argentine economic and social crises began to be noted, and especially when the crisis exploded at the end of 2001, over 100,000 left Argentina for Chile. As a result, in early 2005 they succeeded in becoming the first true foreign colony in the country.

The Argentine colony resides primarily in the IV Region of Coquimbo and La Araucanía Region IX, and has great influence in the region of Patagonia due to the proximity of the various peoples and since the geographic barrier of the Andes does not exist there.

=== Bolivia ===
Bolivian immigration is minor in comparison to the Argentine and Peruvian communities in Chile, but it is not unimportant with more than 20,000 immigrants in the year 2008. This is due primarily to the tense relations that have existed between the two countries, primarily since the War of the Pacific. The continuous diplomatic conflicts between Chile and Bolivia have resulted in the absence of diplomatic relations between them since the mid-1970s. In spite of this, thousands of Bolivians in search of better economic situations have entered Chile, settling primarily in Arica and Calama during the 1960s and since the end of the 1990s.

On the other hand, it is important to emphasize the immigration of the Bolivian elite, who have come primarily for academic reasons. Many of the principal political and economic figures in Bolivia have studied in Chile for a great part of their lives.

=== Ecuador ===
In reality, approximately 15,000 Ecuadorans live in Chilean territory, a number that has risen exponentially during the late 1990s. For many years, Ecuador had been considered a friend of Chile. The Ecuadoran immigrants are largely professionals, principally in the medical fields, and skilled labourers who engage in a various trades.

=== Peru ===
Although Peruvian immigrants have been one of the principal groups of Latin American origin that have settled in Chile, their importance has risen in recent years. The ties between the two regions have been strong since the colonial period: the Captaincy General of Chile first formed part of the Viceroyalty of Peru then was the Captaincy General of Chile, independent from 1798. After the War of the Pacific that pitted Chile against the Bolivian-Peruvian alliance between 1879 and 1883, Chile incorporated the Peruvian territories of the Department of Tarapacá and the provinces of Arica, Tacna (until 1929) and Tarata (until 1925). In these zones in the north of Chile, which were Chile-ized since 1910, they maintained relations primarily of an economic, cultural and even familial nature.

At the end of the 20th century, Chile's economic prosperity began to produce a rapid growth in Peruvian immigration to the central zone of the country. Although many Peruvian immigrants were professionals and held important positions in companies, the majority were of low socioeconomic origin in search of new opportunities for their families. Consequently, they took low-paying positions in the beginning, such as laborers or domestics, and sent their small remittances to their families in their home countries. Many of these immigrants also entered the country illegally. Nevertheless, the Asian financial crisis that affected Chile beginning in 1998 provoked a rise in unemployment figures, surpassing 12%, while Peruvian immigration was increasing. These events caused the public to begin discussing the situation of the Peruvian colony in Chile, with many people claiming that the immigrants were "stealing" Chilean jobs.

In reality, the Peruvian immigrants formed one of the principal foreign colonies in Chile. Some groups of Peruvians have named one of the principal locations of the Peruvian colony "Little Lima" (Pequeña Lima). It is located in the vicinity of the Plaza de Armas in Santiago, which has motivated some groups to question the Chilean authorities for permitting the use of the historic district and symbol of the city by the immigrants. The number of Peruvians in Chile is estimated at 85,000, principally residing in Santiago.

=== Immigration from the United States and Canada ===
Americans and Canadians have long come to Chile and other South American countries. Many Chilean miners, ranchers and businessmen immigrated to the United States (see also Chilean American) as well to Canada aware of the opportunities provided in North America in the 19th and 20th centuries.

=== Other immigrants from the Americas ===
Although they do not have the importance of the aforementioned colonies, there exist an important number of immigrants coming from other countries in the Americas. According to the 2002 report of the International Organization for Migration, more than 10,000 people from the United States have immigrated to Chile, most of whom initially arrived to work for multinational corporations and possess professional degrees and are well situated economically.

According to the same report (2002), more than 9,000 Colombians, 8,900 Brazilians, and 5,000 Venezuelans had settled in Chile. These communities had arrived in the country seeking better economic and academic opportunities, but in general had assimilated into general society. They are, in the majority, well received by the Chileans and are employed in diverse labor activities and have established local businesses.

Along the same lines, more than 3,000 Cubans have settled in Chile, the majority holding professional degrees. The number of medical centers operated by Cubans has increased in the past few years and they have proven to be great successes as a result of their low costs.

As of November 2021, numbers of people entering Chile from elsewhere in Latin America have grown swiftly in the last decade, tripling in the last three years to 1.5 million, with arrivals stemming from humanitarian crises in Haiti (ca. 180,000) and Venezuela (ca 460,000).

== Immigration from Asia ==
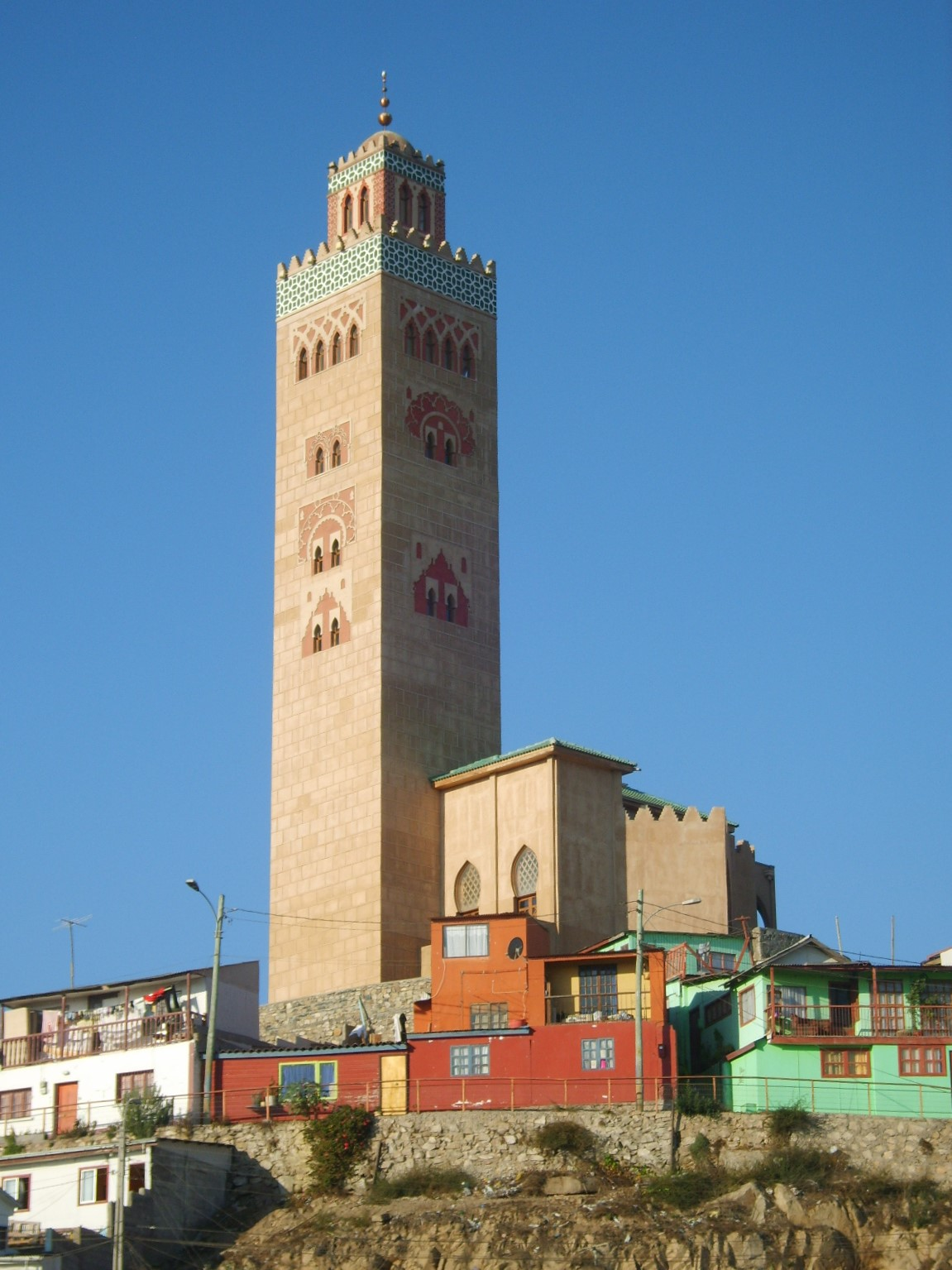
Mosque Mohammed VI Center for Dialogue of Civilizations, in Coquimbo.

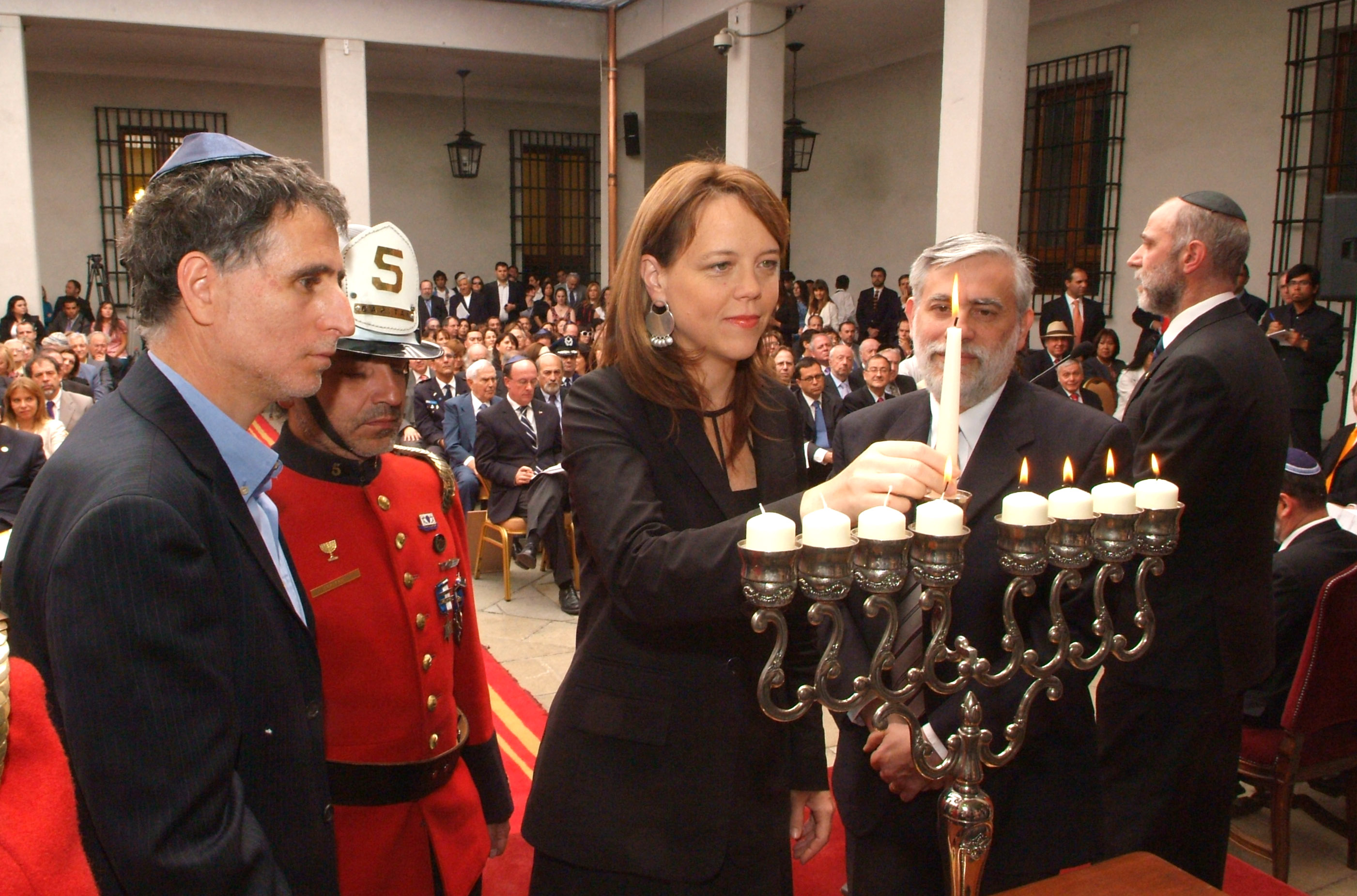
Jewish Hanukkah in La Moneda Palace, Santiago.

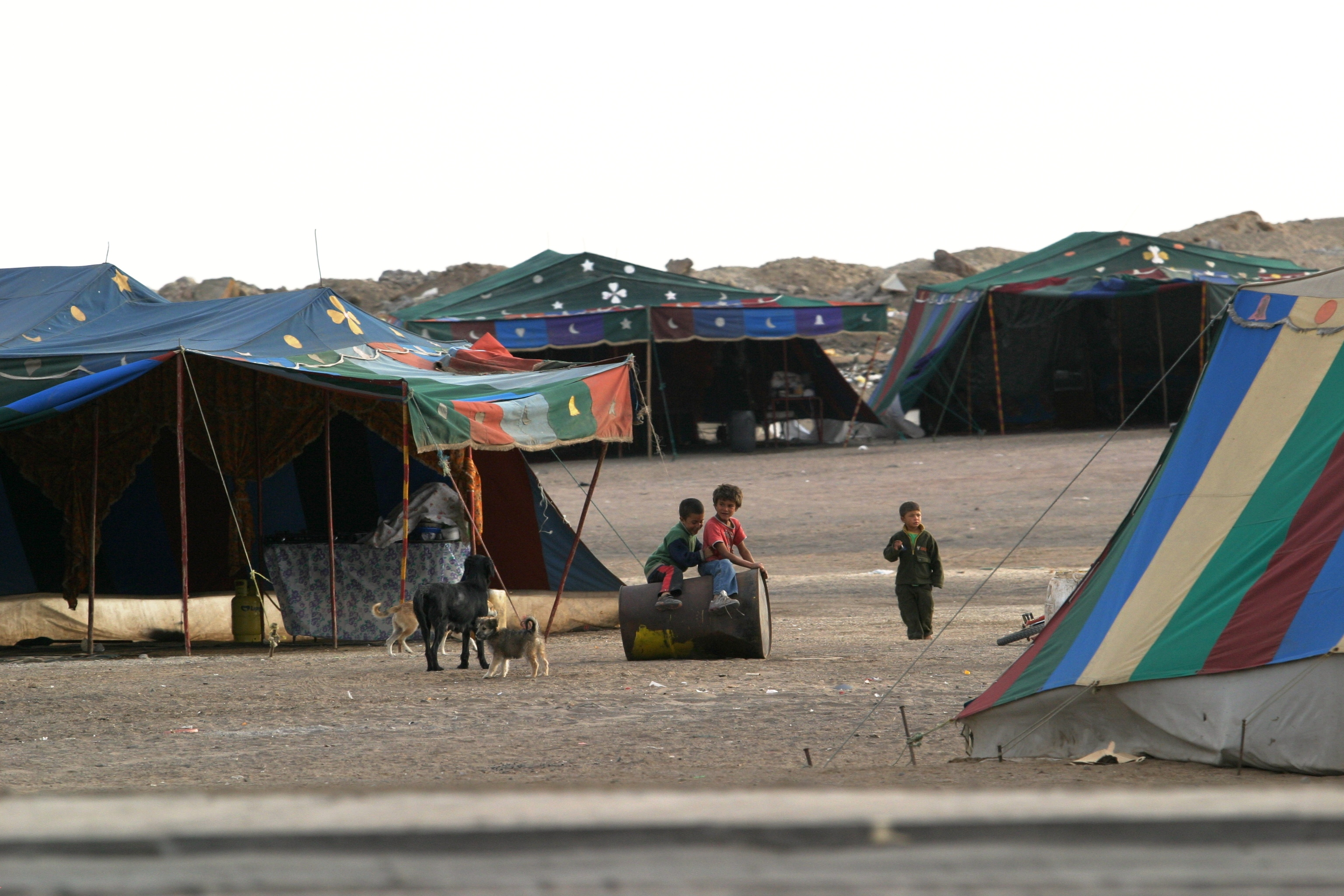
Nomadic settlement of Romani people in Antofagasta.

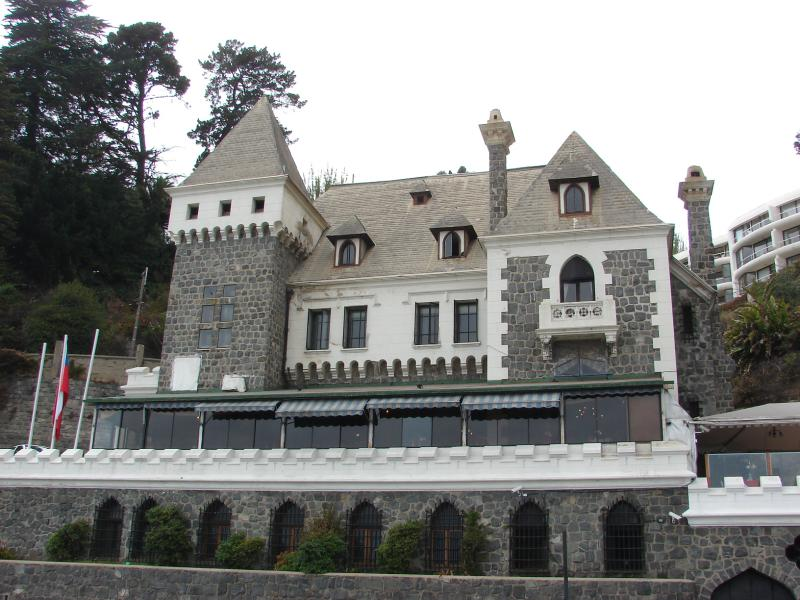
Frontis of Arabian Club in Viña del Mar.

It is estimated that near the 4% of the Chilean population is of Asian origin, who are Asian immigrants and descendants, chiefly of the Middle East. There are a large community of Arab Chileans (i.e. Palestinians, Syrians, Lebanese and Middle East Armenians), and the total number are around 800,000. Note that Jews may be included, whether they are direct descendants of Israeli citizens or Jewish immigrants from Europe.

Chile is home to a large population of immigrants, mostly Christian, from the Levant. Roughly 500,000 Palestinian descendants are believed to reside in Chile. And the effects of their migration are widely visible. The earliest such migrants came in the 1850s, with others arriving during World War I and later the 1948 Arab-Israeli war. The Club Palestino is one of the most prestigious social clubs in Santiago. They are believed to form the largest Palestinian community outside of the Arab world. Aside from these migrants of previous decades, Chile has also taken in some Palestinian refugees in later years, as in April 2008 when they received 117 from the Al-Waleed refugee camp on the Syria-Iraq border near the Al-Tanf crossing. The situation in Gaza has caused tensions even thousands of miles away between the Israeli and Palestinian communities in Chile.

In recent years, Chile had enlarged East Asian populations: considerably from China and Taiwan (See Chinese people in Chile) with a more recent wave from Japan (see Japanese Chilean) and South Korea (see Koreans in Chile). The earliest wave of East Asian immigration took place in the late 19th and early 20th centuries, mainly Chinese and Japanese contract laborers. A small community of Indians in Chile also exists.

== Immigration from Sub-Saharan Africa ==
From the beginning, small numbers of African slaves arrived with the Conquistadors. These slaves (and their descendants) constituted 1.5% of the national population at the beginning of the 19th century. Later on, their descendants—called "pardos" by the Spanish—were partially "absorbed" into the general population through intermarriage. For this reason, about 50% of Chileans have a tiny degree of Sub-Saharan African ancestry, and the number of Chileans with considerable contribution of African ancestry is negligible or virtually nonexistent.

== Number of Immigrants ==
Year	Total Population	Immigrant Population				
Year	Total Population	Total	%	European	Latin American	Others
1865	1,819,223	21,982	1.21%	53.7%	41.4%	4.9%
1875	2,075,971	25,199	1.21%	62.3%	33.0%	4.7%
1885	2,057,005	87,077	4.23%	30.1%	67.2%	2.7%
1907	3,249,279	134,524	4.5%	53.3%	42.7%	4.0%
1920	3,731,593	114,114	3.06%	60.0%	31.2%	8.9%
1930	4,287,445	105,463	2.46%	60.0%	24.6%	15.4%
1940	5,023,539	107,273	2.14%	67.2%	21.7%	11.1%
1952	5,932,995	103,878	1.75%	55.9%	23.4%	20.7%
1960	7,374,115	104,853	1.42%	60.9%	26.1%	13.0%
1970	8,884,768	90,441	1.02%	53.3%	34.4%	12.3%
1982	11,275,440	84,345	0.75%	31.8%	54.5%	13.7%
1992	13,348,401	114,597	0.86%	20.1%	65.1%	14.8%
2002	15,116,435	184,464	1.22%	17.2%	71.8%	11.0%
2012	16,634,603	339,536	2.04%	10.5%	85.6%	3.8%
2017	17,574,003	1,119,267	6.1%	12.4%	83.8%	3.8%
