= Göhler =

Göhler is a German surname. Notable people with the surname include:

- Allison Göhler (born 1984), Chilean meteorologist
- Antje Göhler (born 1967), German chess master and writer
- Christa Göhler (1935–2010), German cross-country skier
- Nico Göhler (born 2003), German racing driver
- Roland Göhler (1943–2025), German rower

== See also ==
- Goler (disambiguation)
