= Alonso de Ovalle =

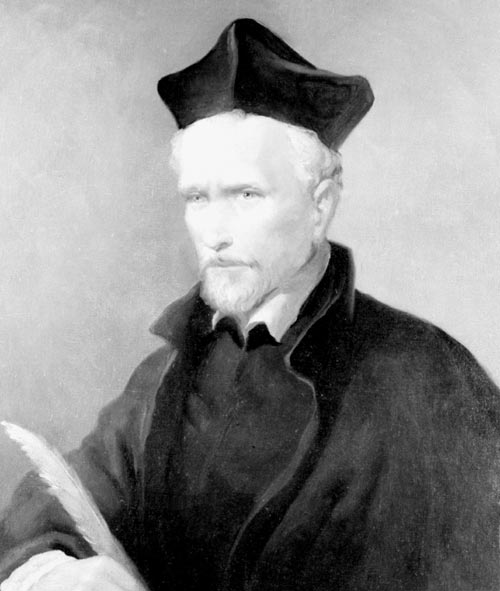
Alonso de Ovalle

Fr. Alonso de Ovalle (Santiago, 1601 – Lima; May 1651) was a Chilean Jesuit priest and chronicler of Chilean history. His book Historica relacion del Reyno de Chile was the first chronicle solely about Chile to be printed. The book described the Conquest of Chile and the Arauco War.

When Ovalle was seventeen, he left home to join the Jesuits. He was sent to study at the Colegio de Córdoba del Tucumán. After eight years he returned to Santiago where he was ordained a priest. He focused on teaching and evangelizing indigenous peoples and slaves. He was also rector of the San Francisco Javier Boarding School in Santiago.

In 1640 he was sent to Rome to gather resources and request more people to minister in Chile. He arrived in Cádiz in 1642. While in Spain he wrote his account of Chile. At the time there were few priests in Spain so he wanted to introduce the relatively new territory. It was the first historical and descriptive work about Chile published in Europe.

A year later the book was translated into Italian. Unfortunately for Ovalle, the priests from outside of Spain were forbidden by the Spanish Crown to enter Chile. Then the 1647 Santiago earthquake destroyed the city. Santiago's city council requested Ovalle to petition the Crown for aid in reconstruction. He did so and used the opportunity to get permission for the foreign priests to travel to Chile. He was successful and they departed in 1650. Ovalle died en route in Lima.

Ovalle also wrote "Breve relación y noticia de la esclarecida Casa de los Pastenes" (Brief Account and Report of the Illustrious House of the Pastenes). He gathered information about his family during his time in Spain. Then when he was in Italy he traveled to Genoa. He was great grandson of the Genoese sailor Juan Bautista Pastene. He recorded the information he gathered into the book about his family. He also used the time tracing the genealogy of Chilean conquerors and rulers to include in his "Historical Account of the Kingdom of Chile".

== Historical Account of the Kingdom of Chile ==
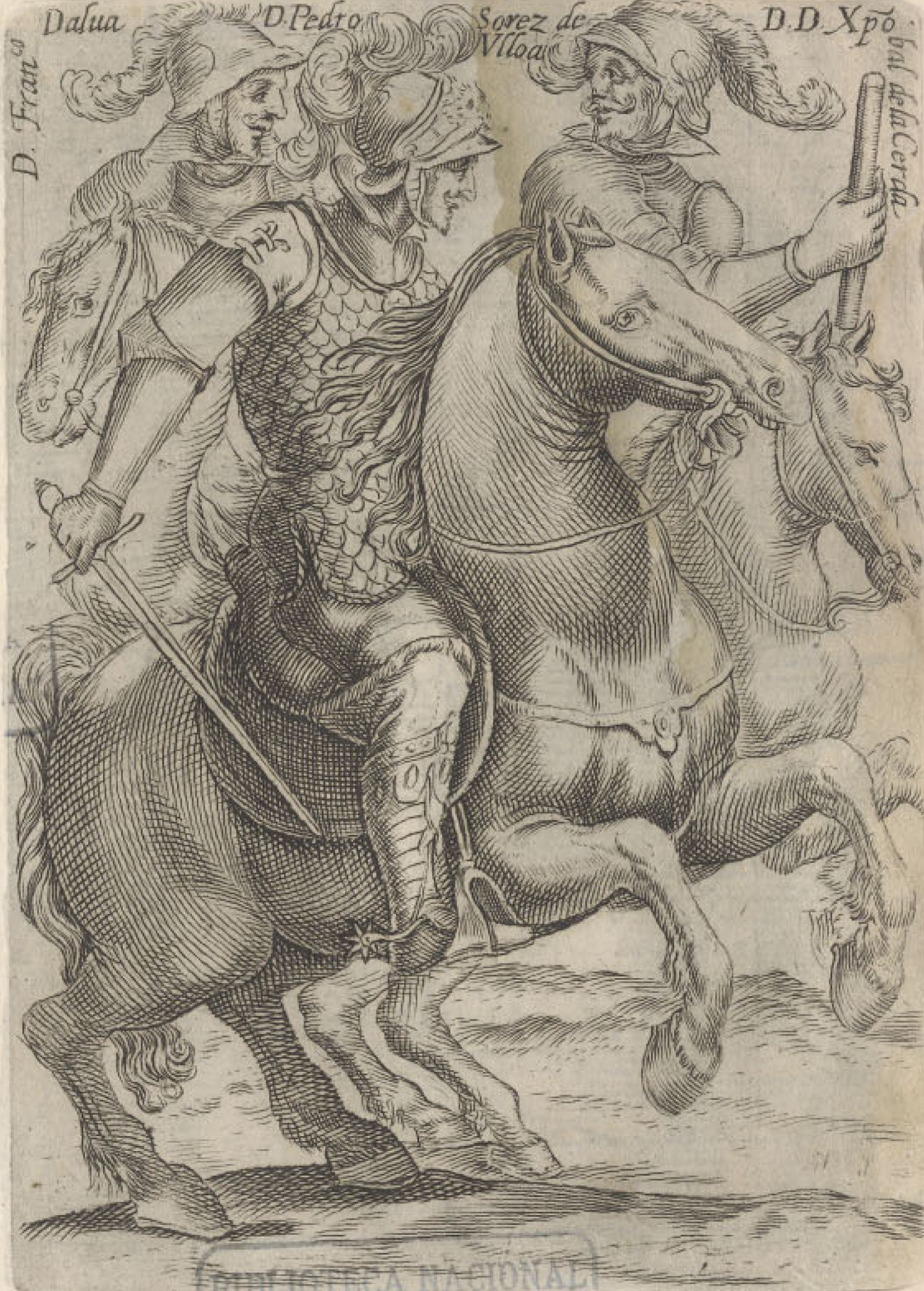
A drawing of Francisco de Alava, Pedro Osores de Ulloa and Cristóbal de la Cerda:Spanish governors of Chile

Fully titled, the "Historical account of the Kingdom of Chile and of the missions and ministries exercised therein by the Society of Jesus", was written based on Ovalle's own knowledge and information he received by letter. In it he described the cities and the rural landscapes, the natural products, the customs, dress, games, and devotions of the people. Because he was writing to encourage Europeans to travel to Chile, his writing resembles current marketing techniques.

The book consists of six parts, two for nature, one for the indigenous people, two for the conquest, one for the Arauco War, and one (the longest) for evangelizing.

Beyond the writing Ovalle included many illustrations. There is a gallery of governors and military figures. A map of Chile is included and considered to be one of the oldest of the country. There are illustrations of different geographical locations as well.
