= Capitán Pastene =

- Town
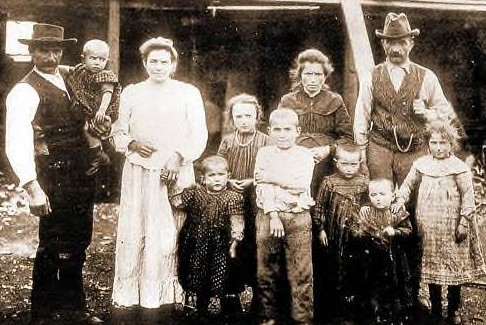
- Italian immigrants to Capitán Pastene in southern Chile

- Location in Chile
- Coordinates: 39°16′36″S 71°58′28″W
- Country: Chile
- Region: Araucanía
- Province: Malleco
- Municipality: Lumaco
- Foundation: 10 March 1904

Population
  - Urban: 2,600
- Time zone: CLT

Capitán Pastene is a town founded by Italian immigrants, located in the commune of Lumaco in the Araucanía Region of Chile.

== History ==
Capitán Pastene was initially founded with the name "Nueva Italia" in 1906. The first settlers were Italians brought by Giorgio Ricci, he had promised land suitable for agriculture, but settlers found themselves immersed in a zone of forested hills. In 1907 the settlement changed name to Capitán Pastene. Several houses recall the days of the earliest settlers of the 87 families, with nearly 770 members, who arrived in 1904 and 1905 from Modena in two successive migrations to focus initially on agriculture and forestry work. Soon a number of settlers moved out to the nearby towns of Traiguén and Temuco or farther away to Santiago or Argentina.

Settlers arrived from the northern Italian region of Emilia Romagna (Bologna and major cities such as Modena) and left a generation of Italo-Chilean that lasts to this day, which has contributed to enriching the local culture.

Capitán Pastene has 2,600 inhabitants many of whom are descendants from that first group from Modena. It is estimated that throughout the region known as "Pastene", people with kinship ties to migrants from Modena number over 16,000. Including the Chileans of Modena descent there are 800,000 Chileans of Italian ancestry, distant or close, including the Italian-Argentines transplanted to Chile.

Currently, there is a considerable revival of Italian traditions in the region of Capitan Pastene.

== Juan Bautista Pastene ==
Giovanni Battista Pastene (1507-1590), after whom the town is named, was a Genoese maritime explorer. He was among the first to explore the Pacific in the sixteenth century. He was a lieutenant of Pedro de Valdivia, and when Emperor Charles V ordered the exploration of southern Chile, this task was entrusted to Pastene.

== Twin cities ==
Capitán Pastene has been proposed to be nominated a comune of southern Chile and thus to be a twin city of Pavullo, a small town near Modena. Most of the original settlers were from Pavullo and Verica.

== See also ==
- Italian Chilean
- Italian people
- Italian diaspora
- Juan Bautista Pastene
- List of towns in Chile
