= Indians in Chile =

Total population
- 1,500

Regions with significant populations
- Punta Arenas · Santiago · Iquique

Languages
- Chilean Spanish · Sindhi · Hindi · Urdu · English · Languages of India

Religion
- Hinduism · Islam · Christianity · Sikhism · Religions of India

Related ethnic groups
- Person of Indian Origin

Indians in Chile form one of the smaller populations of the Indian diaspora. The large majority of them of Sindhi descent. Some Indians settled in Chile in the 1920s. Later more Indians migrated there in the 1980s.

== History ==
Some migrants from the British Raj arrived as labourers in mining, rail and agriculture in the early 20th century – usually under British-owned corporations. However, the majority of Indian Chileans arrived in the 1980s and the 1990s due to economic and sociopolitical crises in their home country.

The first immigrants from India—mostly of Sindhi descent—arrived to Magallanes (present-day Punta Arenas) in 1904, where they worked as traders. Their descendants moved to different parts of the country—mostly to Santiago. Descendants of Sindhi migrants to Chile also live on the northern coast (i.e. Arica, Iquique and Antofagasta). A second (and the largest) wave of Indian immigration that occurred in the 1980s and early 1990s set up an ethno-cultural organization in Santiago known as the Indian Association of Santiago.

As of 2012, there are about 1,500 people of Indian origin living in the country – mostly in Iquique, Santiago and Punta Arenas. About 40% of them have obtained Chilean nationality.

== Business and employment ==
There are various commercial opportunities in Chile for Indian immigrants and multinational firms have begun to arrive and along with them Indian engineers.

== Notable people ==
- Jennifer Mayani – model and actress

== See also ==
- Chile–India relations
- Indian diaspora
- Immigration to Chile
- Asian Latin Americans
- Hinduism in Chile
