= George W. Goler =

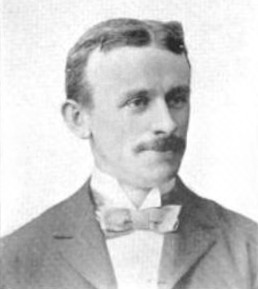
- Born: George Washington Goler; August 24, 1864; Brooklyn, New York, US
- Died: September 18, 1940 (aged 76); Rochester, New York, US
- Education: University at Buffalo School of Medicine
- Occupation: Pediatrician

George Washington Goler (August 24, 1864 – September 18, 1940) was an American pioneer in pediatrics. In addition to being the founder of the first prenatal clinic in the United States, he was the first to advocate a municipal department for the pasteurization of milk.

== Biography ==
George W. Goler was born in Brooklyn on August 24, 1864. He attended the New York College of Pharmacy, and graduated from the University at Buffalo School of Medicine in 1889.

After his appointment in 1896 as the Director of the Board of Health in Rochester, New York, Goler set about to reduce infant mortality. Following the efforts of New York City merchant Nathan Straus, who had provided pasteurized milk at cost to residents of tenements, Goler organized a station for the purification and distribution of milk.

During the months of July and August 1897, when infant deaths were at their highest, Goler arranged for an Infants' Milk Depot to be set up in a storefront in Rochester, with two nurses to pasteurize and cool milk, then to sell it at cost to mothers of small children. A pamphlet entitled "How to Take Care of Babies" was published in four languages and distributed for free. Infant mortality was reduced by 50 percent, and the city established four depots the following summer. In 1900, Goler set about to increase the cleanliness of raw milk, with strict hygienic standards at a particular dairy farm. Infant mortality declined further, and the standards were expanded to cover all dairy farms. Farmers were educated on hygiene, and inspection was increased. While the bacteria count in unsanitary stations was as high as 100,000 per cubic centimeter, the average for Rochester by 1907 was 3,853. An observer at the time wrote that "Rochester to-day has the purest milk supply in America," and added that "Under this system, there is practically no chance whatever for the spread of infectious diseases through an infected milk supply." Other municipalities followed the example set in Rochester, and infant mortality nationwide was reduced considerably, in large part because of the efforts of Dr. Goler to improve the cleanliness of milk.

Golder died in Rochester on September 18, 1940.
