= Goler Metropolitan AME Zion Church =

Historic church in North Carolina, United States

- U.S. National Register of Historic Places
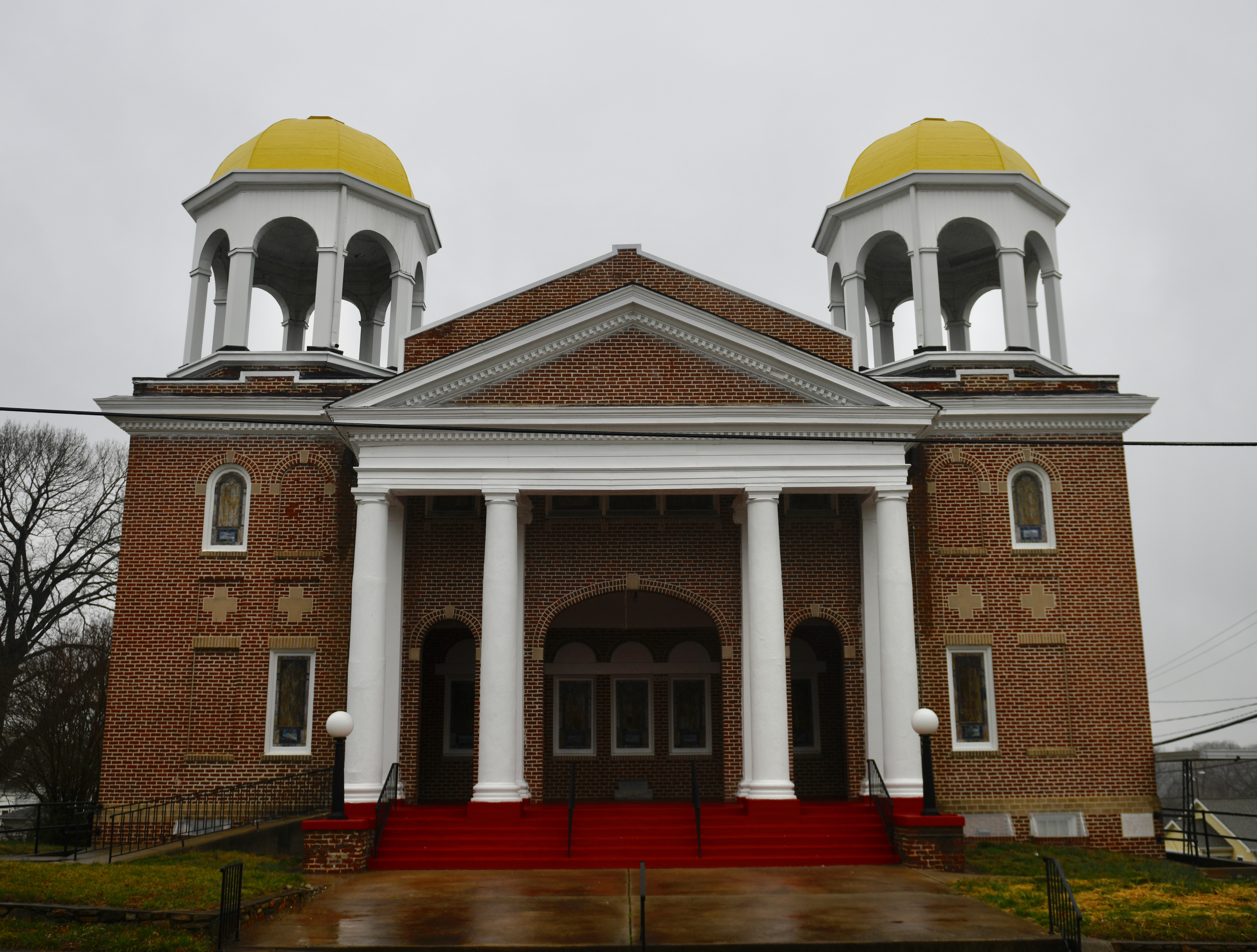

- Location within North Carolina Location within the United States
- Location: 1435 E. Fourth St. Winston-Salem, North Carolina
- Coordinates: 36°5′58″N 80°13′39″W
- Area: less than one acre
- Built: 1924
- Architectural style: Classical Revival
- MPS: African-American Neighborhoods in Northeastern Winston-Salem MPS
- NRHP reference No.: 99000060
- Added to NRHP: January 27, 1999

Goler Metropolitan AME Zion Church, originally known as East Fourth Street Baptist Church, is a historic African Methodist Episcopal Zion church located at 1435 E. Fourth Street in Winston-Salem, Forsyth County, North Carolina. It was built in 1924, and is a front-gabled brick church with two prominent domed towers and flanking one-story hipped-roof wings in the Classical Revival style. The front facade features a prominent pedimented porch supported by stuccoed Doric order columns and Ionic order pilasters. The interior is based on the Akron Plan. The building was acquired by an African-American congregation split from the Goler Memorial African Methodist Episcopal Zion Church in 1942. The congregation changed their name to Goler Metropolitan A.M.E. Zion Church in 1953.

It was listed on the National Register of Historic Places in 1999.
