= Giorgio Ricci =

Giorgio Ricci (b. 1870 in Verica) was an Italian entrepreneur known for bringing Italian immigrants to Araucanía in Chile under fraudulent conditions. Araucanía had been recently incorporated to Chile (1861-1883) when Ricci in 1904 brought over a group of Italian immigrants from Emilia-Romagna, promising good lands for agriculture. Once in Chile, immigrants were disappointed by the fact the lands he granted them were hilly forest not suitable for agriculture. The colony was initially called Nueva Italia, but changed in 1907 to the name Capitán Pastene. Soon however, many left for nearby towns such as Temuco and Traiguén or even further away into Santiago. In 1906, Ricci repeated the scheme bringing Italian immigrants in Brazil to Nueva Etruria west of Gorbea. As with Capitán Pastene, immigrants were lured into lands not particularly suitable for agriculture. By 1908, very few Italians remained in Nueva Etruria. Ricci was rewarded by the Chilean state with lands for helping colonizing the country.
