= Scuola Italiana Arturo Dell' Oro =

Italian international school in Chile

Coordinates: 33.0470°S 71.6105°W

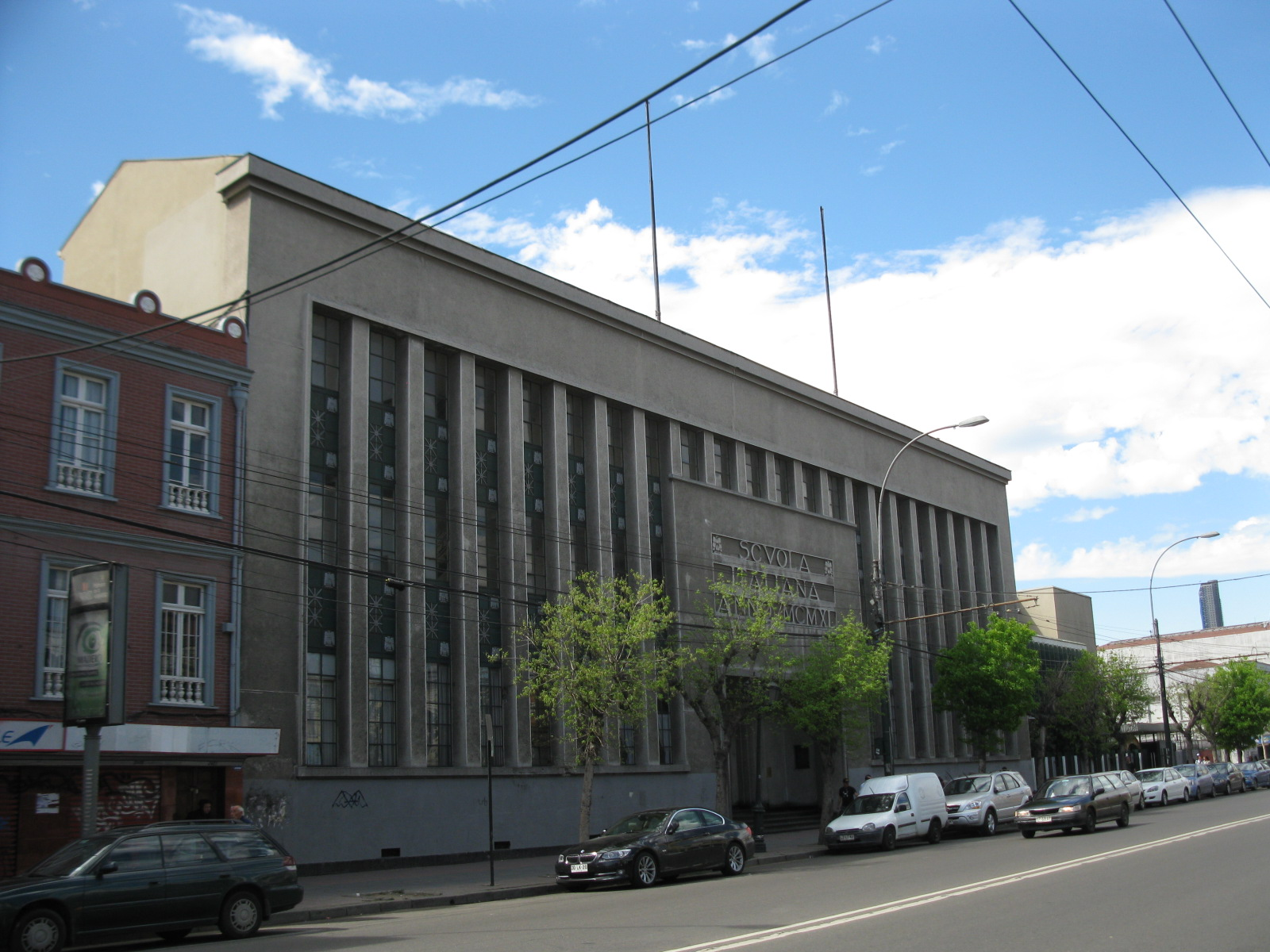
- Scuola Italiana Arturo Dell' Oro Valparaíso campus
- Valparaíso Region; Chile

Information
- Established: 1912; 114 years ago
- Website: www.scuolaitalianavalpo.cl

Scuola Italiana Arturo Dell' Oro is a private Italian international school with campuses in Valparaíso and Viña del Mar in Chile. It serves this city and Vina del Mar and has scuola infanzia (preschool) through secondaria II grado (upper secondary school). The Viña del Mar is located in the Miraflores neighborhood.

The Società Italiana d'Istruzione was established on 12 October 1912. It acquired land at Av. Yerbas Buenas to establish a permanent Italian school. 128 students attended its first classes in 1933. It moved to unfinished facilities in Av. Pedro Montt in 1941. The Viña del Mar school opened in 2003.
