= Goler Memorial African Methodist Episcopal Zion Church =

Historic church in North Carolina, United States

- U.S. National Register of Historic Places
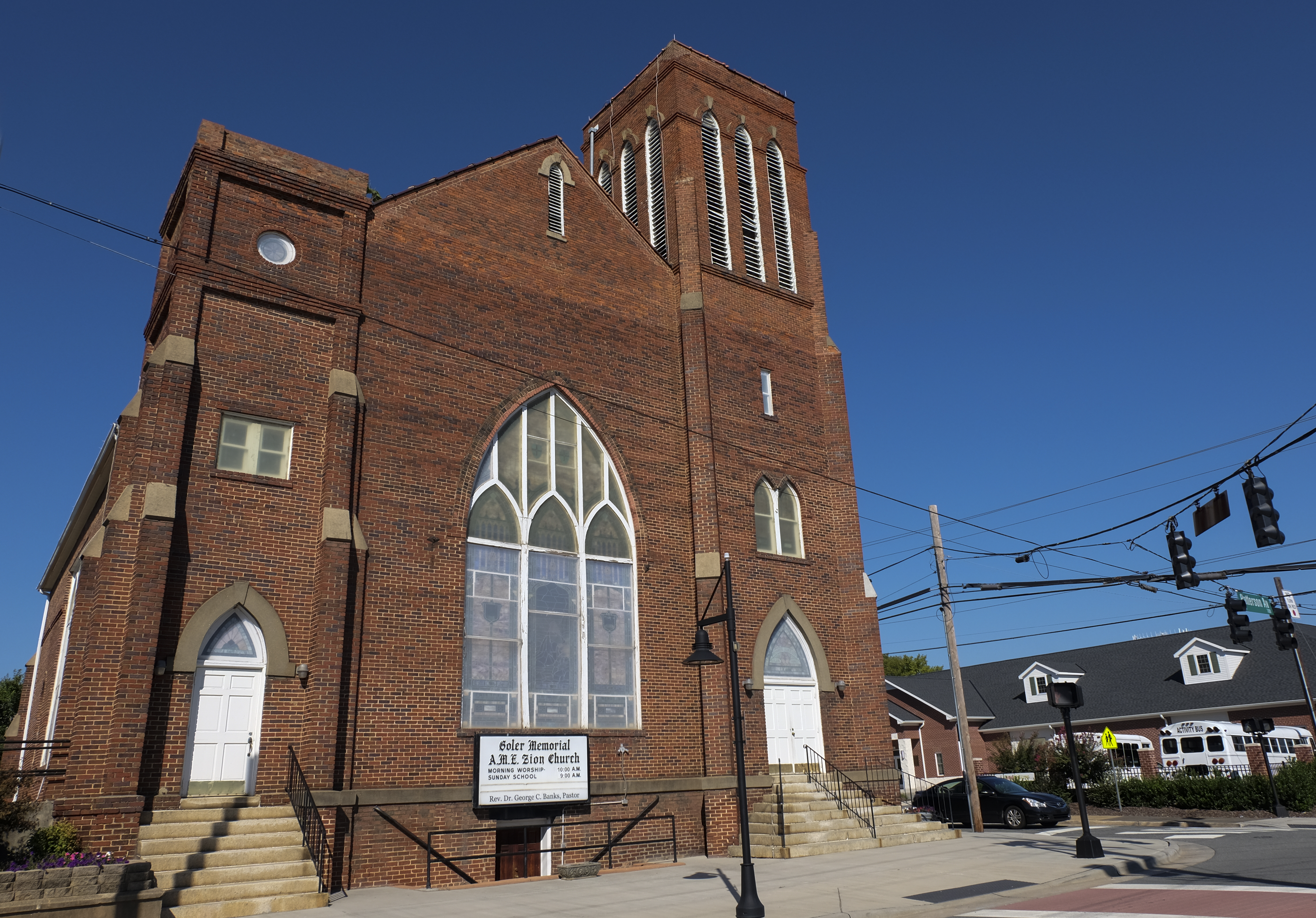

- Location within North Carolina Location within the United States
- Location: 630 Patterson Ave., Winston-Salem, North Carolina
- Coordinates: 36°6′8″N 80°14′30″W
- Area: less than one acre
- Built: 1918-1919
- Architectural style: Late Gothic Revival
- MPS: African-American Neighborhoods in Northeastern Winston-Salem MPS
- NRHP reference No.: 98000727
- Added to NRHP: June 26, 1998

Goler Memorial African Methodist Episcopal Zion Church, also known as Old Goler, is a historic African Methodist Episcopal Zion church located at 630 Patterson Avenue in Winston-Salem, Forsyth County, North Carolina. It was built in 1918–1919, and is a rectangular brick building in the Late Gothic Revival style. It features a gable-front block flanked by two square brick towers and stained glass windows. A two-story annex was built in 1946. In 1942, the Goler Metropolitan AME Zion Church congregation split from the Goler Memorial African Methodist Episcopal Zion Church.

It was listed on the National Register of Historic Places in 1998.
