= Allison Göhler =

Chilean meteorologist

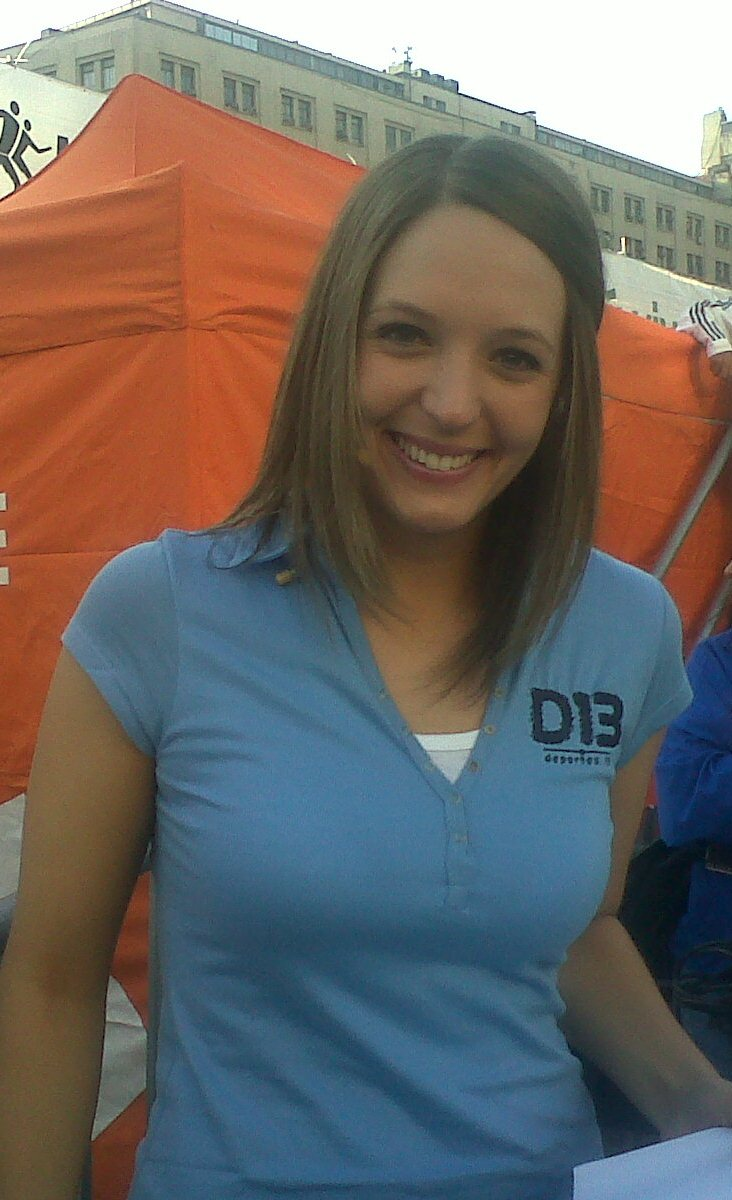
- On the 2011 Santiago Marathon broadcast
- Born: Allison Carolina Göhler Cepeda; 17 December 1984 (age 41); San Antonio, Chile
- Education: University of Valparaíso
- Occupations: Meteorologist, part-time TV host

Allison Göhler (born Allison Carolina Göhler Cepeda, 17 December 1984) is a Chilean meteorologist and part-time TV host.

== Biography ==
=== Life and studies ===
The daughter of a German father and a Chilean mother, Allison Göhler began her studies at Santa Teresita High School in San Antonio, Chile. At age 17 she moved to the city of Valparaíso with her family, starting her studies at the Faculty of Sciences of the University of Valparaíso, where she graduated from the Meteorology program. She has a postgraduate degree in Operational Meteorology from the Aeronautical Technical School. She has worked at the National Center for the Environment (CENMA).

=== Television debut as dancer ===
In 1999, she first appeared on television as the double of Marie Serneholt of the group A-Teens in a doubling contest on TVN's Buenos Días a Todos. Later, she was a member of the Groupo X dance troupe on the Chilevisión program Extra jóvenes. In 2000 she participated as a dancer on the Mega program Mekano, where she spent approximately 2 months.

=== Return to television as meteorologist ===
In early 2011, Göhler participated in a casting call for the presenter of the weather forecast for the new Canal 13 morning show Bienvenidos, where she was selected and gave the weather forecast all week. She was also on the special broadcast of the 2011 Santiago Marathon as its meteorologist, and co-hosted an edition of the program Quiero mi fiesta along with Daniel Fuenzalida. She was on Canal 13 for approximately 4 months.

Later she worked on the morning program Mucho gusto with the weather forecast, and on Morandé con compañía where she was a meteorologist, panelist, and journalist. In 2012, she was a meteorologist for La Red on the programs El Tiempo en La Red, Mujeres primero, Mañaneros, and Hora 20. In the summer of 2013, she arrived at TVN's Buenos Días a Todos morning program as a temporary replacement for Iván Torres. She worked as a journalist presenting real estate projects on the program Pabellón de la Construcción, broadcast on Chilevisión. From April 2013 to January 2014, she was part of TVN's TV Tiempo as the third host, giving the weather forecast a few days a month on TVN, TVN HD, 24 Horas, TV Chile (international broadcast), and TVN Internet.

=== Guachaca Queen ===
In 2011, she was invited by the newspaper La Cuarta to compete for the crown of Guachaca Queen on behalf of Canal 13 together with Claudio Palma, coming in third with a total of 10% (6,431 votes).

== TV programs ==
Dates	Title	Role	Channel
1999	Buenos Días a Todos	Dancer	TVN
1999–2000	Extra jóvenes	Dancer	Chilevisión
2000	Mekano	Dancer	Mega
March–June 2011	Bienvenidos	Meteorologist	Canal 13 Canal 13 HD
3 April 2011	Santiago Marathon	Meteorologist	Canal 13 Canal 13 HD
18 June 2011	Quiero mi fiesta	Host	Canal 13 Internet
August–December 2011	Mucho gusto	Meteorologist	Mega Mega HD
August–December 2011	Morandé con compañía	Meteorologist, panelist, and journalist	Mega Mega HD
August 2011 – April 2013	Pabellón de la Construcción	Journalist	Chilevisión Chilevisión HD
January–July 2012	El Tiempo en La Red	Meteorologist	La Red La Red HD
January–July 2012	Mujeres primero	Meteorologist	La Red La Red HD
January–July 2012	Mañaneros	Meteorologist	La Red La Red HD
January–July 2012	Hora 20	Meteorologist	La Red La Red HD
2013 – January 2014	Buenos Días a Todos	Meteorologist, host	TVN TVN HD
April 2013 – November 2014	TV Tiempo	Meteorologist	TVN TVN HD Canal 24 Horas
October 2022-present	Noticias Univisión Chicago: Primera Edición or Despierta Chicago	Meteorologist	WGBO-TV
