= Juan Bautista Pastene =

16th-century Italian maritime explorer of South America

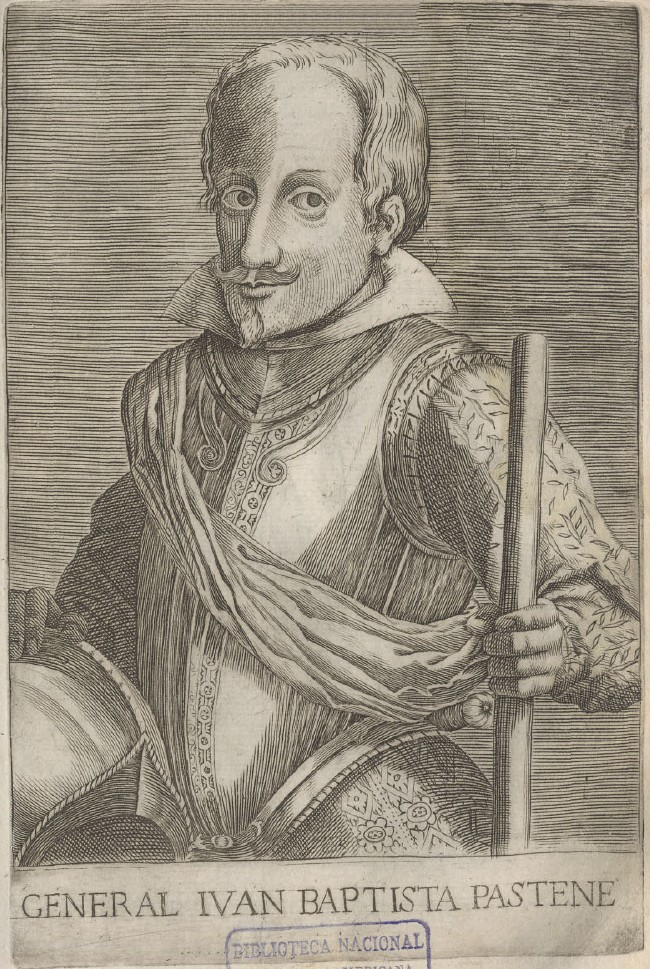
- Idealized illustration of Pastene from Alonso de Ovalle's "Histórica relación del Reyno de Chile".
- Born: 1507; Genoa
- Died: 1580; Santiago, Chile

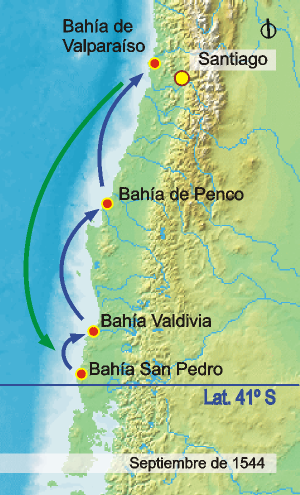
Map showing the September 1544 expedition led by Pastene.

Giovanni Battista Pastene (1507–1580) was a Genoese maritime explorer who, while in the service of the Spanish crown, explored the coasts of Panama, Colombia, Ecuador, Peru and Chile as far south as the archipelago of Chiloé.

== Early life ==
Juan Bautista Pastene was born in Genoa. His parents were Thomas and Esmeralda Solimana Pastene. He married Geneva Seixas, with whom he had three children. He arrived in Honduras in 1526, traveling in his own ship. He then came to Peru in 1536 to serve Francisco Pizarro. In 1544, and was pilot and Master of the ship Concepción.

He participated actively in many maritime explorations, which led to him being appointed by the Audiencia of Panama as a piloto mayor of the Mar del Sur (the Spanish name for the Pacific Ocean at the time).

== Chile ==
King Charles V ordered the exploration of southern Chile. This task was given by the Viceroy of Peru to Pastene, in 1543, for which he was awarded the title of general de la Mar del Sur.

In 1544 Pedro de Valdivia entrusted exploring the coasts of the south to Pastene, ordering him to reach the Strait of Magellan. Although he did not reach this goal, he explored much of the coast. He was the first to arrive at Bay of Concepción, in the ship "San Pedro", and took possession of it.

In 1545 Pastene went to Peru in search of aid for the new settlements in Chile, returning in 1547. He made other voyages in support of the struggling colony.

In 1550, Pastene supported Valdivia's campaign into Mapuche territory in what is now the Biobío Region linking up with the conquistadors land expedition at Penco with his two ships on February 23, 1550. There he was present in the foundation of Concepción. He took one ship to acquire provisions at an offshore Island where seven of his crew were killed by the islanders.

During the Government of García Hurtado de Mendoza, Juan Bautista Pastene made a naval reconnaissance down the coast to Chiloé. He also held the position of regidor of the city of Santiago, Chile in 1548, 1551, 1553, 1557 and 1568, and was mayor in 1564. He was also the first Governor of Valparaíso. He died in 1580 in Santiago, Chile.

The city of Capitán Pastene, formed by Italian immigrants to Chile in the early 1900, was named in his honor.

He was great grandfather of the Jesuit chronicler Alonso de Ovalle.

== Sources ==
- Pedro de Valdivia, Cartas de Pedro de Valdivia (Letters of Pedro Valdivia), University of Chile: Diarios, Memorias y Relatos Testimoniales: (on line in Spanish)
- Inicio Historia de Chile / Biografías / Juan Bautista Pastene
