= List of international presidential trips made by Sebastián Piñera =

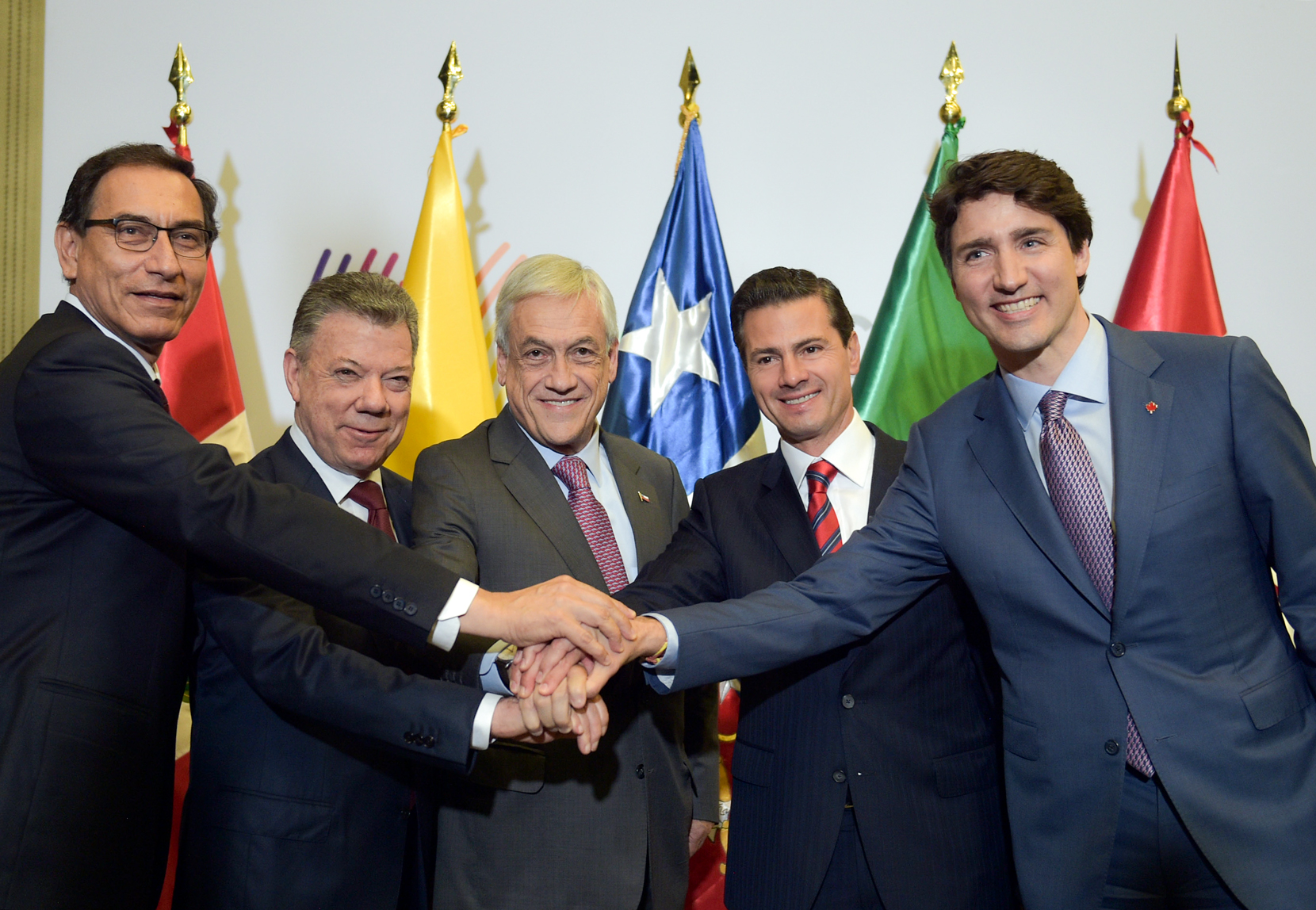
Martin Vizcarra, Juan Manuel Santos, Sebastián Piñera, Enrique Peña Nieto and Justin Trudeau in the 8th Summit of the Americas.

This is a list of international trips made by Chilean President Sebastián Piñera in his first and second term as the 34th and 36th President of Chile.

== Summary of international trips ==
Number of visits	Country
1 visit	Belgium, Canada, China, Costa Rica, Cuba, El Salvador, Indonesia, Jamaica, Japan, Jordan, Mexico, New Zealand, Papua New Guinea, Paraguay, Russia, Singapore, Thailand
2 visits	Germany, Israel, Italy, Palestine, Panama, South Korea, United Kingdom, Uruguay, Venezuela
4 visits	Argentina, France, Peru, Spain, Vatican
6 visits	Brazil, Colombia
9 visits	United States

== First term (2010–2014) ==
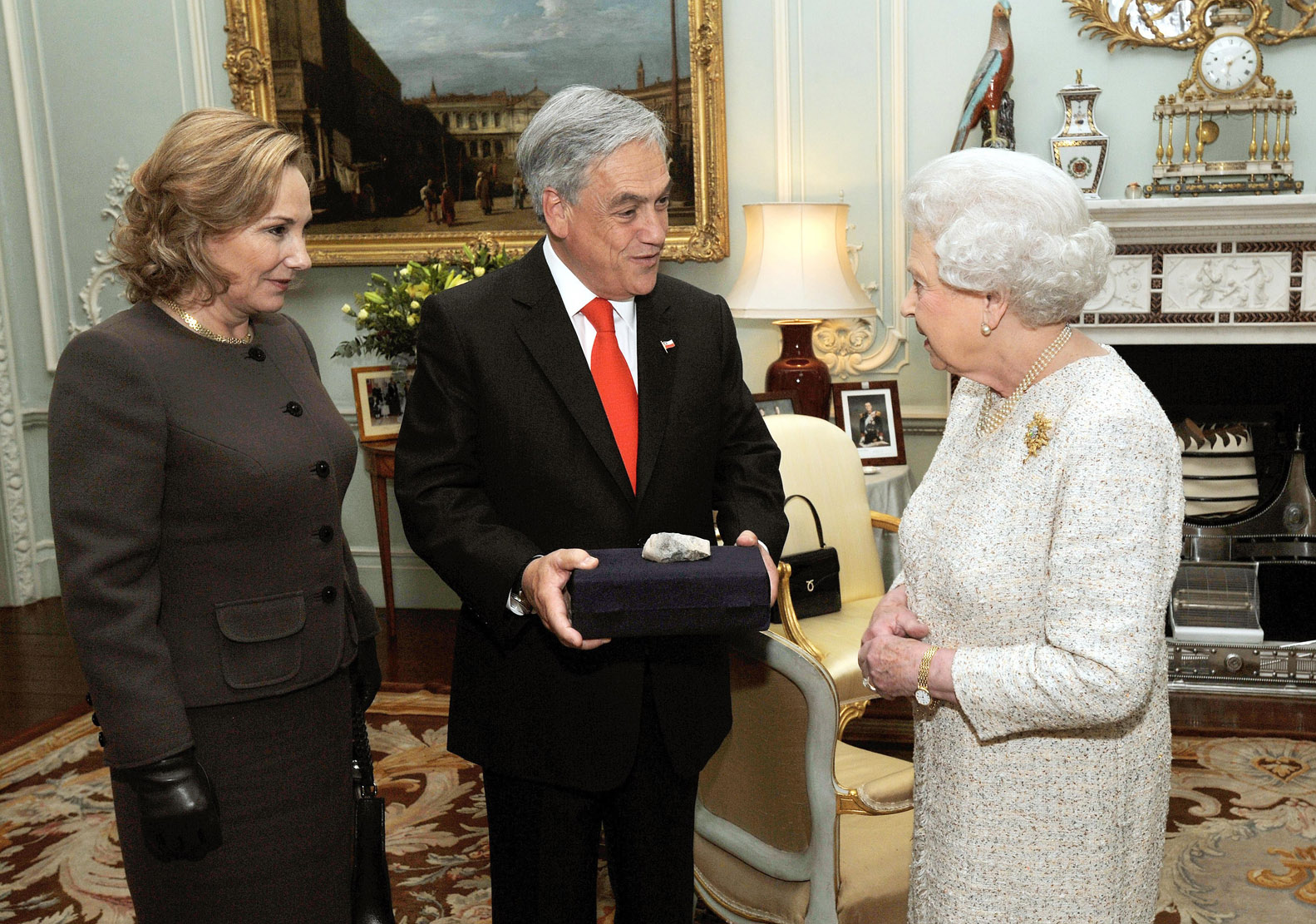
President Piñera & First Lady Morel with Elizabeth II during their state visit to United Kingdom in October 2010.

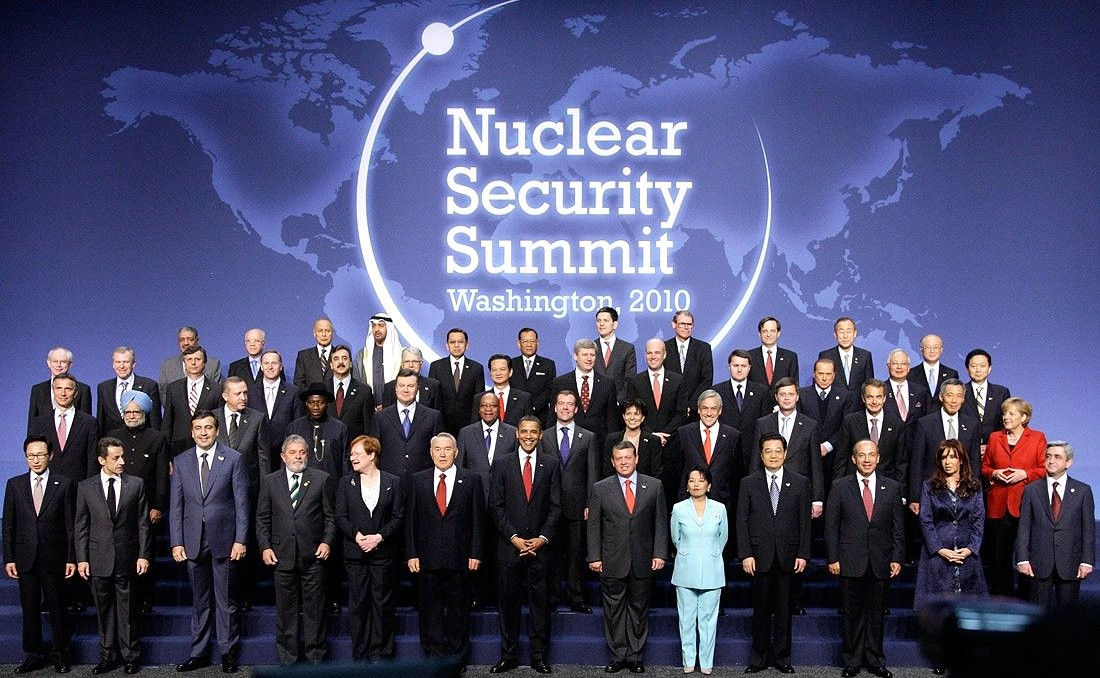
President Piñera attending the 2010 Nuclear Security Summit with other state leaders.

=== 2010 ===
Country	Areas visited	Date(s)	Notes
Argentina	Buenos Aires	8 April	Further information: Argentina–Chile relations First trip abroad as president. Met with President Cristina Fernández de Kirchner to thank Argentina for its aid after the 2010 Chile earthquake.
Brazil	Brasília	9 April	Further information: Brazil–Chile relations Met with President Luiz Inácio Lula da Silva.
United States	Washington, D.C.	11 – 13 April	Further information: Chile–United States relations Attended the 2010 Nuclear Security Summit. Held his first bilateral meeting with President Barack Obama.
Colombia	Bogotá	6 – 7 August	Further information: Chile–Colombia relations Travelled to attend the inauguration of President Juan Manuel Santos, but cut the visit short to return to Chile because of the mining accident in Copiapó; Foreign Minister Alfredo Moreno represented Chile at the ceremony.
United States	New York Los Angeles San Francisco	21 – 26 September	Further information: Chile–United States relations Opened NYSE trading for Chile Day and addressed the 65th UN General Assembly (23 September). In California, met Governor Arnold Schwarzenegger (24 September).
United Kingdom	London	16 – 17 October	Further information: Chile–United Kingdom relations Met with Prime Minister David Cameron and Queen Elizabeth II after the rescue of the 33 miners.
France	Paris	19 – 21 October	Further information: Chile–France relations Met with President Nicolas Sarkozy and addressed the UNESCO Executive Board.
Germany	Berlin	21 – 23 October	Further information: Chile–Germany relations Met with Chancellor Angela Merkel.
Argentina	Mar del Plata	3 – 4 December	Further information: Argentina–Chile relations Participated in the 20th Ibero-American Summit.

=== 2011 ===
Country	Areas visited	Date(s)	Notes
Brazil	Brasília	1 January	Further information: Brazil–Chile relations Attended the inauguration of President Dilma Rousseff. He also announced Chile's recognition of a Palestinian state.
Italy	Rome	28 February – 2 March	Further information: Chile–Italy relations Met with Prime Minister Silvio Berlusconi and President Giorgio Napolitano.
Vatican		2 March	Private audience with Pope Benedict XVI, who invited him to visit Chile.
Israel	Jerusalem	3 – 6 March	Further information: Chile–Israel relations First official visit to Israel by a sitting Chilean president. Met with Prime Minister Benjamin Netanyahu and President Shimon Peres.
Palestine	Ramallah Bethlehem	5 March	Further information: Chile–Palestine relations Met with President Mahmoud Abbas. First visit to Palestine by a Chilean president.
Jordan	Amman	6 – 7 March	Working stopover.
Spain	Madrid	7 – 9 March	Further information: Chile–Spain relations State visit. Met with King Juan Carlos I and Prime Minister José Luis Rodríguez Zapatero. Addressed the Congress of Deputies.
Peru	Lima	27 – 28 April	Further information: Chile–Peru relations Met with Alan García, Felipe Calderón and Juan Manuel Santos to launch the "Deep Integration Area", precursor of the Pacific Alliance.
Peru	Lima	27 – 28 July	Further information: Chile–Peru relations Attended the inauguration of President Ollanta Humala.
United States	New York	21 – 23 September	Further information: Chile–United States relations Participated in the 66th UN General Assembly.
United States	Honolulu	10 – 13 November	Further information: Chile–United States relations Participated in the 2011 APEC Summit. Signed the Chile–Vietnam Free Trade Agreement with President Trương Tấn Sang.
Venezuela	Caracas	2 – 3 December	Participated in the founding summit of the Community of Latin American and Caribbean States (CELAC).

=== 2012 ===
Country	Areas visited	Date(s)	Notes
South Korea	Seoul	26 – 27 March	Participated in the 2012 Nuclear Security Summit.
Colombia	Cartagena	14 – 15 April	Further information: Chile–Colombia relations Participated in the 6th Summit of the Americas.
Brazil	Rio de Janeiro	20 June	Further information: Brazil–Chile relations Participated in the Rio+20 Conference.
Russia	Vladivostok	7 – 9 September	Participated in the 2012 APEC Summit. Witnessed the signing of the Hong Kong–Chile Free Trade Agreement, and met with President Vladimir Putin.
Spain	Cádiz	16 – 18 November	Further information: Chile–Spain relations Participated in the 22nd Ibero-American Summit.

=== 2013 ===
Country	Areas visited	Date(s)	Notes
Venezuela	Caracas	8 March	Attended the funeral of President Hugo Chávez.
Vatican		16 – 20 March	Headed Chile's delegation at the inauguration of Pope Francis, who invited him to visit Chile.
Canada	Ottawa Toronto	30 – 31 May	Further information: Canada–Chile relations Meeting with Prime Minister Stephen Harper.
United States	Washington, D.C.	2 – 4 June	Further information: Chile–United States relations Working visit. Met with President Barack Obama on 4 June.
El Salvador	San Salvador	4 – 5 June	Stopped in El Salvador on his way to Panama.
Panama	Panama City	5 June	Received the Collar of the Order of Manuel Amador Guerrero.
United States	New York	21 – 25 September	Addressed the 68th UN General Assembly.
Thailand	Bangkok	3 – 5 October	Met with Prime Minister Yingluck Shinawatra. Signed the Chile–Thailand Free Trade Agreement.
Indonesia	Bali	6 – 8 October	Participated in the 2013 APEC Summit.

=== 2014 ===
Country	Areas visited	Date(s)	Notes
Cuba	Havana	28 – 29 January	Participated in the 2nd CELAC Summit, in which he handed the pro tempore presidency to Costa Rica. Met with President Ollanta Humala.

== Second term (2018–2022) ==
=== 2018 ===
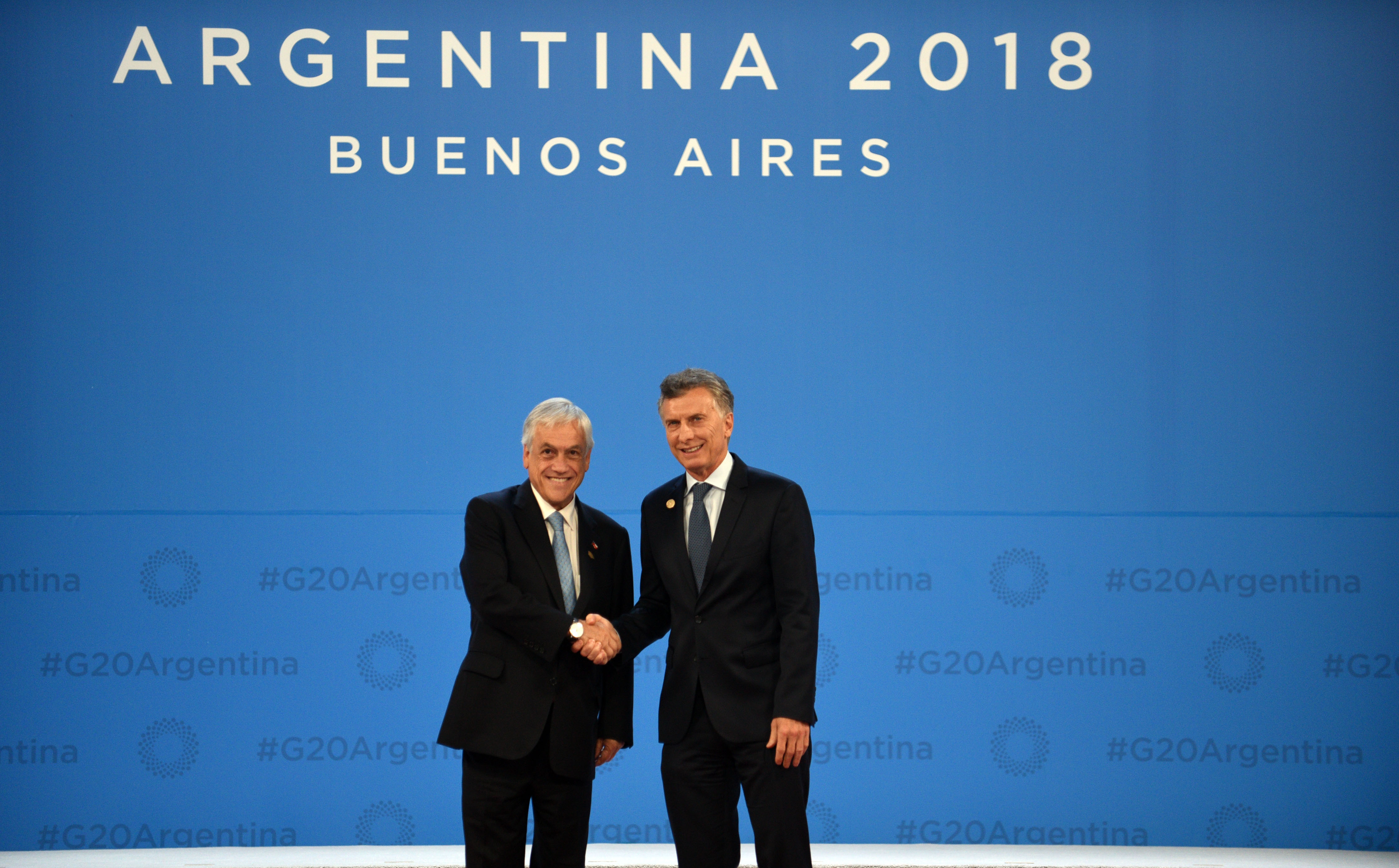
Sebastián Piñera and Mauricio Macri in the 2018 G20 Buenos Aires Summit.

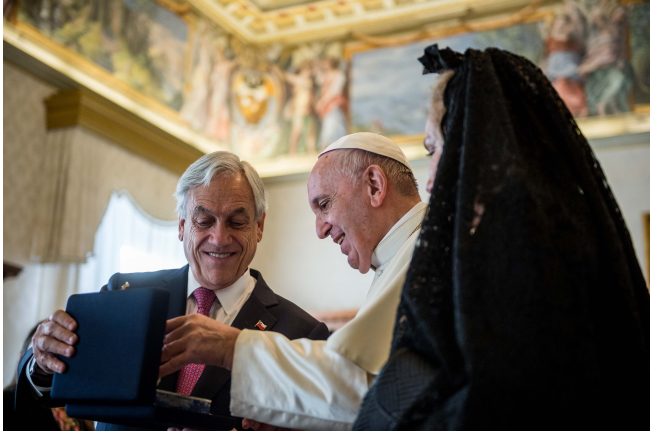
Piñera, Pope Francis and First Lady Cecilia Morel during their visit to the Vatican.

Country	Areas visited	Date(s)	Notes
Peru	Lima	13 – 14 April	Further information: Chile–Peru relations Participated in the 8th Summit of the Americas.
Argentina	Buenos Aires	25 – 26 April	Further information: Argentina–Chile relations State visit. Met with President Mauricio Macri
Brazil	Brasília	27 April	Further information: Brazil–Chile relations State visit. Met with President Michel Temer.
Jamaica	Montego Bay	6 – 8 July	Further information: Foreign relations of Chile Participated as guest of the 39th CARICOM Summit.
Costa Rica	San José	8 – 9 July	Further information: Foreign relations of Chile State visit. Met with President Carlos Alvarado.
Panama	Panama City Panama Canal	9 – 10 July	Further information: Foreign relations of Chile State visit. Met with President Juan Carlos Varela.
United States	Idaho	10 – 11 July	Further information: Chile–United States relations Went to Sun Valley 2018 technology forum.
Mexico	Puerto Vallarta	23 – 24 July	Further information: Chile–Mexico relations Participated in the XIII Pacific Alliance Summit.
Colombia	Bogota	7 August	Further information: Chile–Colombia relations Ceremony of Possession of the President Iván Duque.
United States	New York Washington, D.C.	25 – 28 September	Further information: Chile–United States relations Participed in the 73rd UN General Assembly. On September 28, he met with President Donald Trump.
France	Paris	6 – 8 October	Further information: Chile–France relations State visit. Met with President Emmanuel Macron.
Spain	Madrid	8 – 10 October	Further information: Chile-Spain relations State visit. Met with the King Filipe VI and the President Pedro Sánchez.
Germany	Hamburg Berlin	10 – 12 October	Further information: Chile–Germany relations State visit. Met with the Chancellor Angela Merkel and the President Frank-Walter Steinmeier.
Belgium	Brussels	12 – 13 October	Further information: Foreign relations of Chile State visit. Met with the King Philippe and the President of European Commission Jean-Claude Juncker.
Vatican		13 October	Further information: Foreign relations of Chile Met with Pope Francis.
Singapore	Singapore	13 – 15 November	Further information: Foreign relations of Chile State visit. Met with the President Halimah Yacob and the Prime Minister Lee Hsien Loong.
Papua New Guinea	Port Moresby	16 – 18 November	Further information: Foreign relations of Chile Participated in the 2018 APEC Summit.
New Zealand	Wellington	18 – 20 November	Further information: Chile–New Zealand relations State visit. Met with the Prime Minister Jacinda Ardern.
Argentina	Buenos Aires	30 November – 1 December	Further information: Argentina–Chile relations Participated as guest of the G20 Summit.

=== 2019 ===
Country	Areas visited	Date(s)	Notes
Brazil	Brasília	1 January	Further information: Brazil–Chile relations Attended the Ceremony of Possession of the President Jair Bolsonaro.
Colombia	Cúcuta	22 February	Further information: Venezuela Crisis Participated in Venezuela Aid Live.
China	Beijing Shenzhen	24 – 28 April	Further information: Chile-China relations State visit. Participated in the 2nd Belt and Road Forum.
South Korea	Seoul	29 – 30 April	Further information: Foreign relations of Chile State visit. Met with the President Moon Jae-in.
Israel	Tel Aviv	25 – 26 June	Further information: Chile–Israel relations State visit. Met with the Prime Minister Benjamin Netanyahu.
Palestine	West Bank	27 June	Further information: Chile–Palestine relations State visit. Met with the President Mahmoud Abbas.
Japan	Osaka	28 – 30 June	Further information: Chile–Japan relations Participated as guest of the G20 Summit.
France	Biarritz	24 – 26 August	Further information: Chile–France relations Participed as guest of the 45th G7 summit.
Brazil	Brasília	27 – 28 August	Further information: Brazil–Chile relations State visit. Met with the President Jair Bolsonaro.

=== 2020 ===
Country	Areas visited	Date(s)	Notes
Uruguay	Montevideo	March 1	Further information: Chile–Uruguay relations Attended the Inauguration of Luis Lacalle Pou.

=== 2021 ===
Country	Areas visited	Date(s)	Notes
Peru	Lima	28 July	Further information: Chile–Peru relations Attended the inauguration of Pedro Castillo.
France	Paris	6 September	Further information: Chile–France relations State visit. Met with the President Emmanuel Macron.
Spain	Madrid	7 September	Further information: Chile–Spain relations State visit. Met with the President Pedro Sánchez.
Italy	Rome	8 September	Further information: Chile–Italy relations State visit. Met with the President Sergio Mattarella and the Prime Minister Mario Draghi.
Vatican		9 September	Met with Pope Francis.
United Kingdom	London	10 September	Further information: Chile-United Kingdom relations State visit. Met with Prime Minister Boris Johnson.
United States	New York City	21-26 September	Further information: Chile–United States relations Participed in the 76th UN General Assembly.
Colombia	Cartagena Turbaco	24-25 September	Further information: Chile–Colombia relations State visit. Met with the President Iván Duque.
Uruguay	Montevideo	27 September	Further information: Chile–Uruguay relations State visit. Met with the President Luis Lacalle Pou.
Paraguay	Asunción	28 September	Further information: Chile–Paraguay relations State visit. Met with the President Mario Abdo Benítez.

=== 2022 ===
Country	Areas visited	Date(s)	Notes
Colombia	Bahía Málaga Cartagena	26 – 27 January	Further information: Chile–Colombia relations Participated in the XVI Pacific Alliance Summit in Bahía Málaga and the III PROSUR Presidential Summit in Cartagena.

== See also ==
- List of international presidential trips made by Michelle Bachelet, his predecessor and one of his successors
