= Spanish Chileans =

Spanish Chileans Hispano-chileno
Total population
- 25,624 Spanish citizens Vast majority of Chileans have at least partial Spanish ancestry (from colonial times)

Regions with significant populations
- All over Chile

Languages
- Chilean Spanish, Peninsular Spanish, Galician, Catalan, Basque

Religion
- Mainly Roman Catholicism, Evangelicalism and Protestantism minorities

Related ethnic groups
- Chilean people, Spaniards, and other Latin American peoples

Spanish Chileans refer more often to Chileans of post-independence Spanish immigrant descent, as they have retained a Spanish cultural identity. People of pre-independence Spanish descent are typically not classified as Spanish Chileans even though they form a large majority of the Chilean population and have Spanish surnames and ancestry. This is because they rejected Spanish identity for the emergent Chilean one on the eve of national independence.

== History ==
The earliest European immigrants were Spanish colonisers who arrived in the 16th century. They came to form the majority of the population by the time of Chilean independence. They came mainly from Castile and Andalusia and formed the majority population. The Amerindian population of central Chile was absorbed into the Spanish settler population in the beginning of the colonial period to form the large mestizo population that exists in Chile today; mestizos create modern middle and lower classes. In the 18th and 19th centuries, many Basques from both Spain and France came to Chile where they integrated into the existing elites of Castilian origin. Other European nationalities then followed and also became rich and fused with each other and the Basque-Castilian elite to create modern middle and upper classes. At the beginning of the Guano era in 1840s, one of Peru's most prosperous time periods, immigration from Spain greatly increased and the economy was booming and standard of living was high. This era ended in 1866 with the Chincha Islands War wherein anti-Spanish sentiments in Peru also arose in Chile and in which Peru emerged victorious. In 1903, a fleet of 88 Canarian families—400 persons—arrived in Budi Lake, that currently have more than 1,000 descendants, as a response to the government's call to populate this region and signed contracts for the benefit of a private company. While many Canarians obeyed their servitude, some of those who disobeyed the provisions of repopulation tried to escape their servitude and were arrested, and the indigenous Mapuche people took pity on the plight of these Canarians who were established on their former lands. The Mapuches welcomed them and joined their demonstrations in the so-called "revolt of the Canarians", and many Canarians integrated into Mapuche population to add the large mestizo population that exists in Chile. In the 20th century, there was an influx of refugees of the Spanish Civil War and Franco's regime.(see Winnipeg ship) They have kept their Spanish national identity and set up Spanish clubs throughout the country. The Spanish culture of the original settlers slowly evolved into Chilean folk culture, especially the huaso one, and at the time of independence had abandoned national affiliation with Spain.

== Notable Spanish Chileans ==
- Isabel Allende, writer
- Alejandro Amenábar, film director
- Manuel Blanco Encalada, 1st (provisional) President of Chile (1826), Vice-Admiral in the Chilean Navy
- Matías Cousiño, coal magnate and patriarch of the Cousiño family
- Javiera Díaz de Valdés, actress
- Karen Doggenweiler Lapuente, journalist, TV hostess
- Roberto Matta, abstract expressionist and surrealist painter
- Jorge Montt, 12th president of Chile (1891–1896), vice-admiral of the Chilean navy
- Carlos Pezoa Véliz, writer
- José Piñera, businessman and politician
- Sebastián Piñera, businessman and President of Chile (2010-2014 and 2018-2022)
- Arturo Prat, Navy officer and national hero
- Carlos Prats, Former Army Commander in Chief
- José Joaquín Prieto, Army General and President of Chile (1831-1841)
- Germán Riesco, President of Chile (1901-1906)
- Carolina Tohá, politician
- José Tohá, politician
- Leonor Varela, actress

== List of Spanish cultural centres and other institutions in Chile ==
They have regional cultural centres in Santiago and other large cities.

- 7ª. Cía. de Bomberos "Bomba España", Antofagasta
- Centro Español de Antofagasta
- Sociedad Española de Beneficencia de Antofagasta
- Centro Español, Arica
- Estadio Español de Chiguayante
- Centro Español de Chillán
- Hogar Español de Chillán
- Sociedad Española de Beneficencia de Chillán
- Centro Español de Concepción
- Sociedad Española de Beneficencia de Concepción
- Colectividad Española, Coquimbo
- Corporación Unión Española de Coyhaique
- Centro Español de Curicó
- Club Deportivo Español de Curicó
- Estadio Español de Curicó
- Sociedad de Damas del Pilar de Curicó
- Sociedad Española de Beneficencia de Curicó
- Casino Español de Iquique
- Sociedad Española de Beneficencia, Iquique
- Sociedad Española de Beneficencia, Las Condes
- Estadio Español de Linares
- Sociedad Española de Beneficencia, Linares
- Centro Español de Los Andes
- Sociedad Española de Beneficencia, Los Andes
- Centro Español de Los Ángeles
- Club Deportivo Español de Osorno
- Sociedad Española de SS.MM. de Osorno
- Colectividad Valenciana de Chile Providencia
- Instituto Chileno de Cultura Hispánica, Providencia
- Centro Español de Puerto Montt
- Centro Español de Puerto Natales
- Sociedad Española de Punta Arenas
- Centro Español de Rancagua
- Corporación Club Español de Campo Reñaca-Viña
- Centro Cultural Español San Antonio
- Centro Español de San Fernando
- Sociedad Española de Beneficencia, San Fernando
- 10a. Cía. de Bomberos "Bomba España", Santiago
- Camara Oficial Española de Comercio de Chile
- Centro Navarro de Chile, Santiago
- Círculo de Profesionales Hispánicos, Santiago
- Círculo Español, Santiago
- Colectividad Andaluza de Chile, Santiago
- Colectividad Asturiana de Chile, Santiago
- Colectividad Castellano-Leonesa de Chile, Santiago
- Colectividad Madrileña de Chile, Santiago
- Comité de Damas de A.I.E.CH., Santiago
- Confederación de Bombas Españolas en Chile, Santiago
- Coolectividad Aragonesa de Chile, Santiago
- Estadio Español de Las Condes
- Hogar Español, Santiago
- Lar Gallego, Santiago
- Sociedad Benéfica La Rioja, Santiago
- Sociedad Española de Socorros Mutuos y Beneficencia, Santiago
- Unión Española, Santiago
- Agrupación Winnipeg, Santiago
- Centre Català de Santiago de Xile, Santiago
- Centro Vasco, Santiago
- 5a. Cía de Bomberos Bomba España de Talca
- Centro Español de Talca
- Club Deportivo Español de Talca
- Escuela Especial España, Talca
- Ropero Español de Talca
- Sociedad Española de Beneficencia de Talca
- 4a. Cía. de Bomberos Bomba España, Temuco
- Centro Español de Temuco
- Sociedad Española de Beneficencia de Temuco
- Centro Español de Valdivia
- 7a. Cía. de Bomberos Bomba España, Valparaíso
- Sociedad Española de Beneficencia, Valparaíso
- Club Unión Española Valparaíso, Viña del Mar
- Soc. de Beneficencia Damas Españolas Viña del Mar

== See also ==
- Chile–Spain relations
- White Latin Americans
