= Uruguayan Chileans =

Uruguayans in Chile Uruguayos en Chile
Total population
- Census: 5,308 (2016)

Regions with significant populations
- Santiago, rest of Chile

Languages
- Spanish, Uruguayan Rioplatense Spanish, Portunol, Brazilian Portuguese, Uruguayan Portuguese, Italian

Religion
- Roman Catholicism and Protestantism

Related ethnic groups
- Uruguayans

Uruguayan Chileans (Spanish: Uruguayos Chilenos) are people born in Uruguay who live in Chile, or Chilean-born people of Uruguayan descent.

== Overview ==
Many Uruguayan-born people live in Chile, for a number of reasons. Both countries share the Spanish language; the historical origins of both nations is common (part of the Spanish Empire until the early 19th century); Chile has a bigger, more diverse economy, which attracted Uruguayans in search of opportunities; the relative geographical vicinity (Southern Cone) also helps.

Modern estimates put the figure of Uruguayans in Chile at over 9,000.

Uruguayan residents in Chile have their own institutions, for instance, the Consultative Council in Santiago.

== Notable people ==
Past

- Elio García-Austt (1919-2005), neuroscientist
- José Gervasio Viera Rodríguez (1948–1990), singer
- Walter Kliche (1926-2024), actor
- Fernando Kliche (1954-2026), actor

Present

- Carlos Aguiar, footballer
- Guillermo Amoedo, film director
- Carlos Canzani, musician
- Gonzalo Yáñez, singer-songwriter
- Diego Guastavino, footballer
- Irina Karamanos, anthropologist, partner of the former President Gabriel Boric
- Laura Prieto, model and actress
- Jael Ünger, actress
- Liliana García, actress
- Alfredo Alonso, television presenter, producer, musician
- Nelson Acosta, football coach
- Daniel Lencina, trumpetist and composer

== See also ==
- Chile–Uruguay relations
- Chileans in Uruguay
- Emigration from Uruguay
