= Chile–Palestine relations =

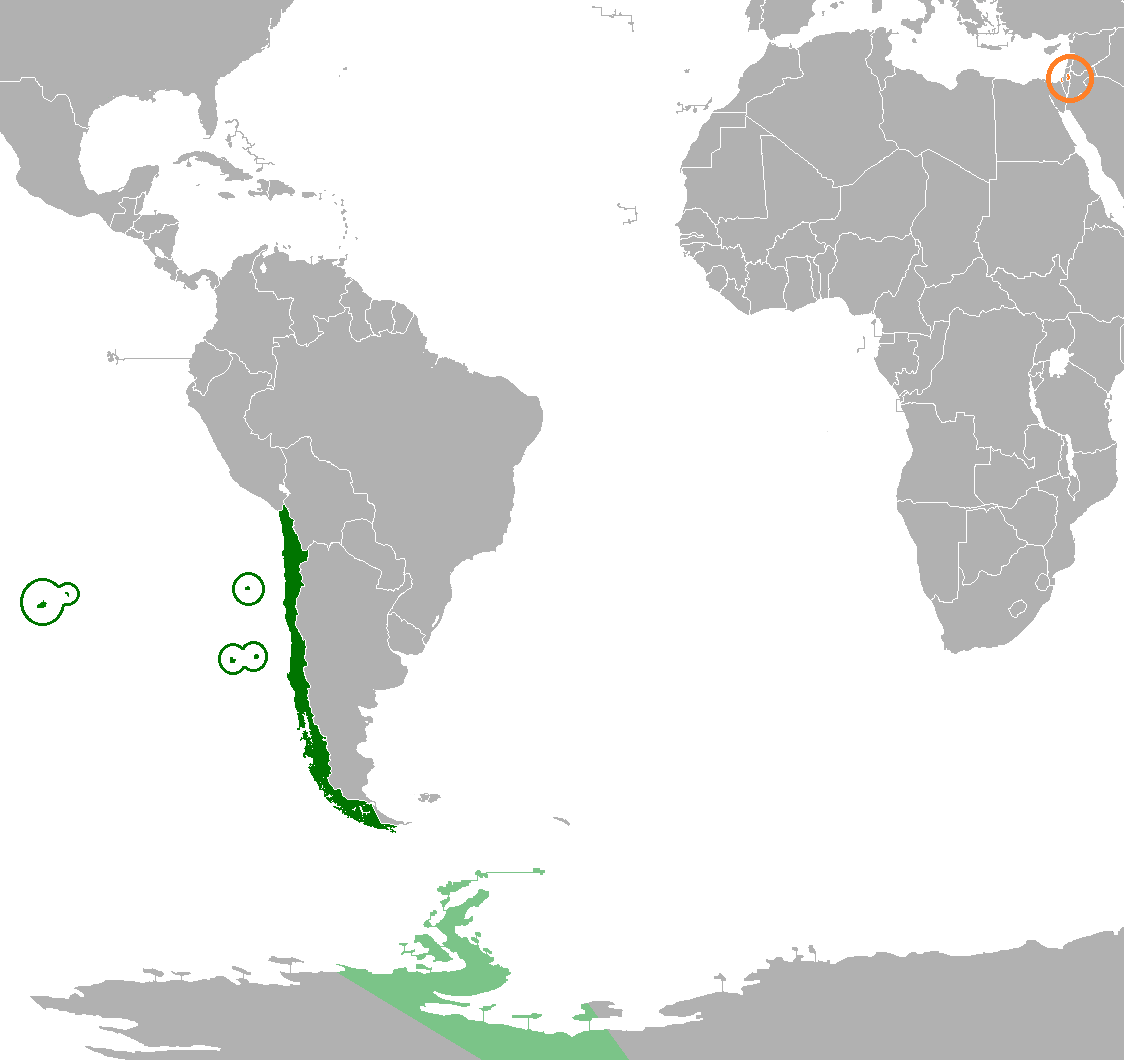

- Chile: Palestine

Chile–Palestine relations are the current and historical relations between the Republic of Chile and the State of Palestine. Both nations enjoy friendly relations, the importance of which centers on the history of Palestinian migration to Chile.

== History ==
In the late 1800s, Palestinians began arriving to Chile—many of whom were young men escaping conscription into the Ottoman Army. Over time, more Palestinians would arrive to Chile and work in various industries in the country—particularly in the textile industry. In 1947, Chile abstained from voting in the United Nations Partition Plan for Palestine.

In 1990, the Palestine Liberation Organization (PLO) established an "Information Office" in Santiago. In 1994, with the formation of the Palestinian National Authority, the Information Office changed its category to a "Representation Office of Palestine in Chile". In April 1998, Chile was the first Latin American country to open a Representation Office to the Palestinian National Authority in Ramallah.

In January 2011, Chile recognized Palestine as an independent nation. A few months later, in March 2011, Chilean President Sebastián Piñera paid a visit to Palestine and visited Bethlehem and the city of Ramallah where he met President of the Palestinian National Authority, Mahmoud Abbas. During his visit, President Piñera also visited and laid a wreath on the tomb of Yasser Arafat. In May 2018, President Mahmoud Abbas paid a visit to Chile. During his visit, President Abbas and President Piñera discussed the Two-state solution to the Israeli–Palestinian conflict.

In June 2019, President Piñera paid a second visit to Palestine and traveled to East Jerusalem, Bethlehem and Ramallah, where he met again with Mahmoud Abbas.

In December 2022, President Gabriel Boric announced that Chile would upgrade its official representation in the Palestinian territories from a chargé d'affaires to a full embassy. Boric suspended military relations with Israel in May 2025 and recalled Chile's ambassador to Israel.

The start of the presidency of José Antonio Kast in March 2026 marked an unprecedented souring of diplomatic relations between Chile and Palestine, Kast having taken a markedly pro-Israel stance and repeatedly criticising previous president Gabriel Boric on his use of the term "genocide". In August 2026, Kast re-established military relations with Israel, a decision strongly criticized by the director of the Palestinian Community in Chile, Diego Khamis.

== High-level visits ==
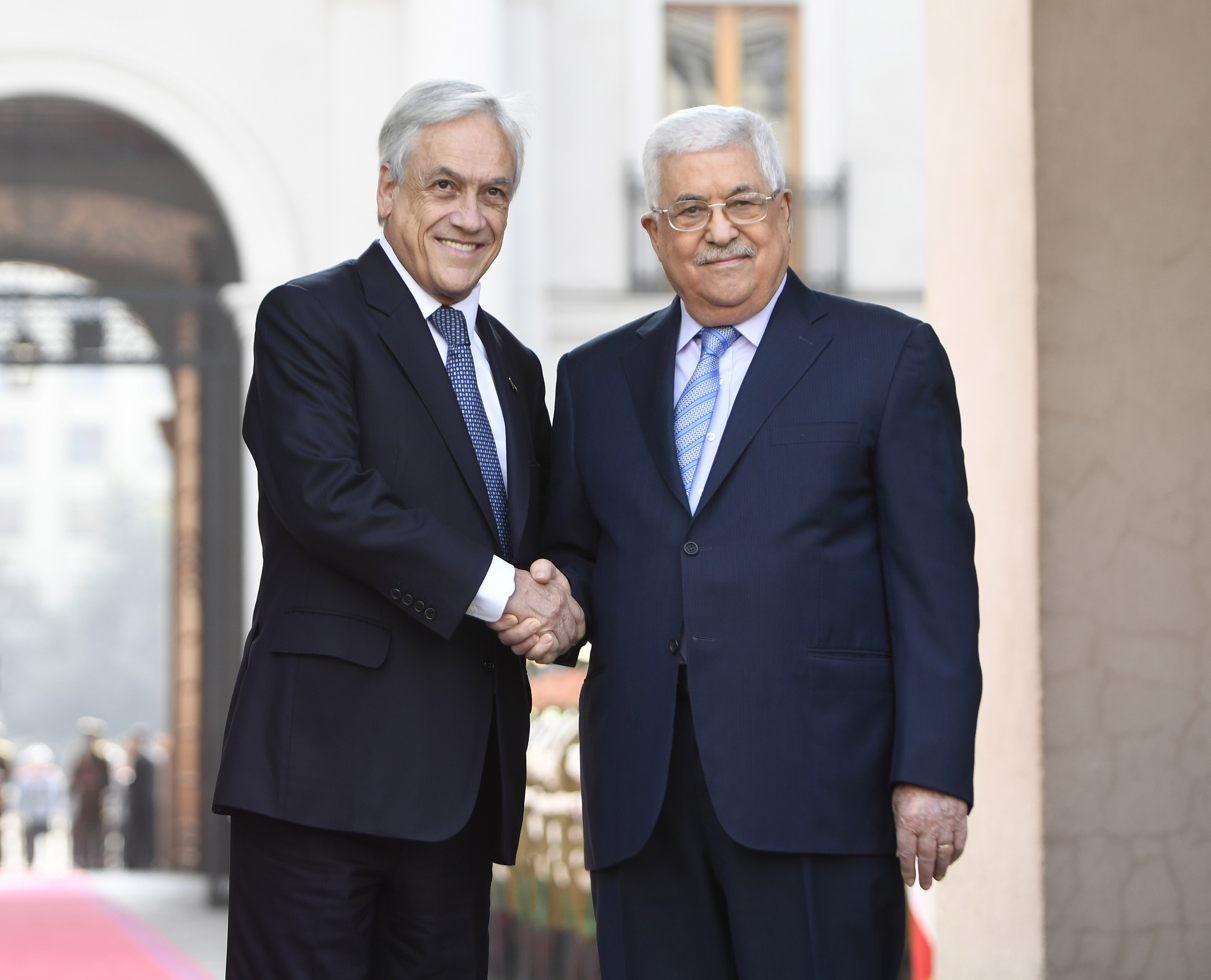
Chilean President Sebastián Piñera and President Mahmoud Abbas in Santiago; May 2018

High-level visits from Chile to Palestine

- President Sebastián Piñera (2011, 2019)
- Deputy Foreign Minister Edgardo Riveros (2014)

High-level visits from Palestine to Chile

- Deputy Minister of Social Affairs Anwar Hamam (2015)
- Deputy Foreign Minister Tayser Farahat (2017)
- President of the Palestinian National Authority Mahmoud Abbas (2018)

== Bilateral agreements ==
Both nations have signed a few agreements such as Memorandum of Understanding for Scientific, Technical, Cultural and Educational Cooperation (1996); Memorandum of Understanding between the Ministries of Health of Chile and the Palestinian National Authority, regarding health matters (2008); Memorandum of Understanding on Economic Cooperation (2011); Agreement on visa exemption for holders of diplomatic and official passports (2016); and a Memorandum of Understanding on Cultural Cooperation (2017).

== Diaspora ==
There is a community of approximately 600,000 people of Palestinian origin in Chile which makes Chile having the largest Palestinian community outside of the Middle East.

== Resident diplomatic missions ==
- Chile has a representative office in Ramallah.
- Palestine has an embassy in Santiago.
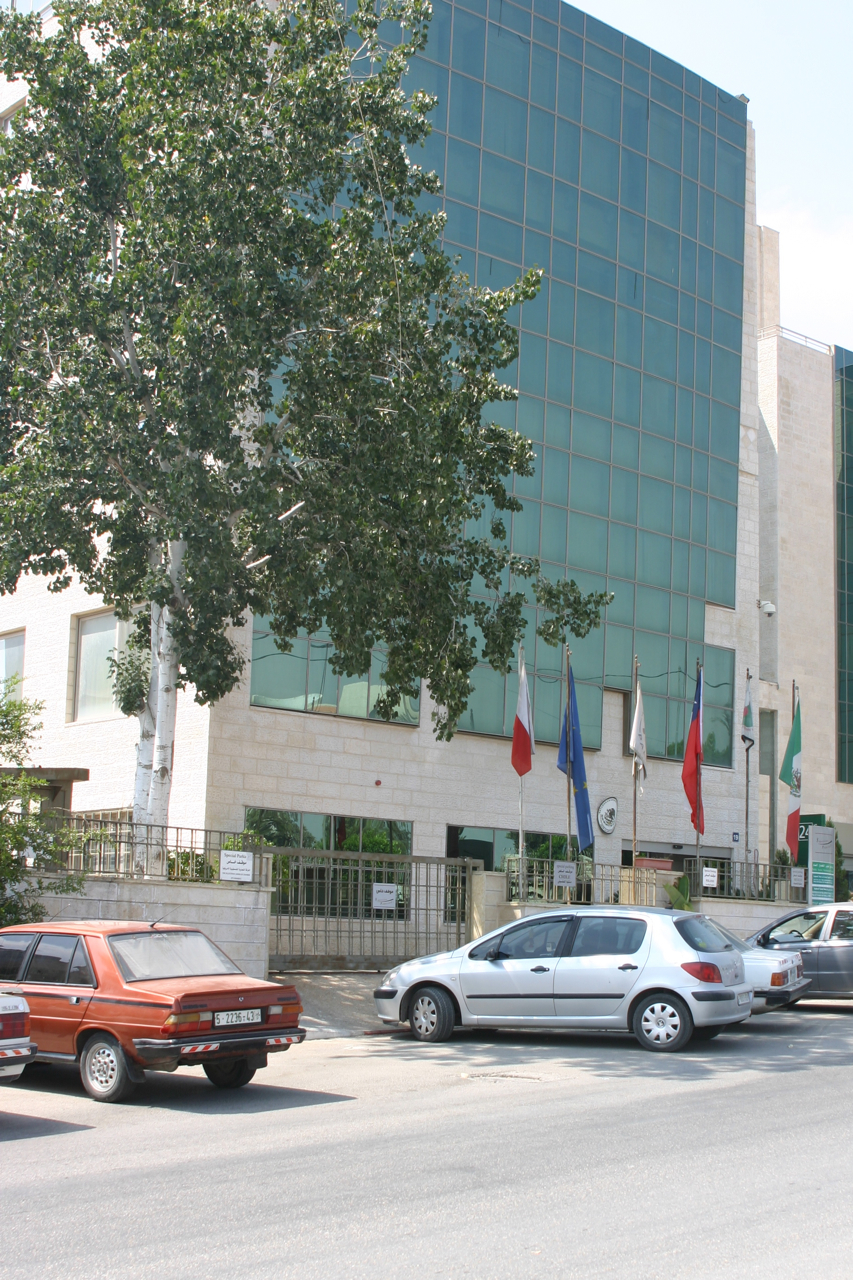
Building hosting the Representative office of Chile in Ramallah

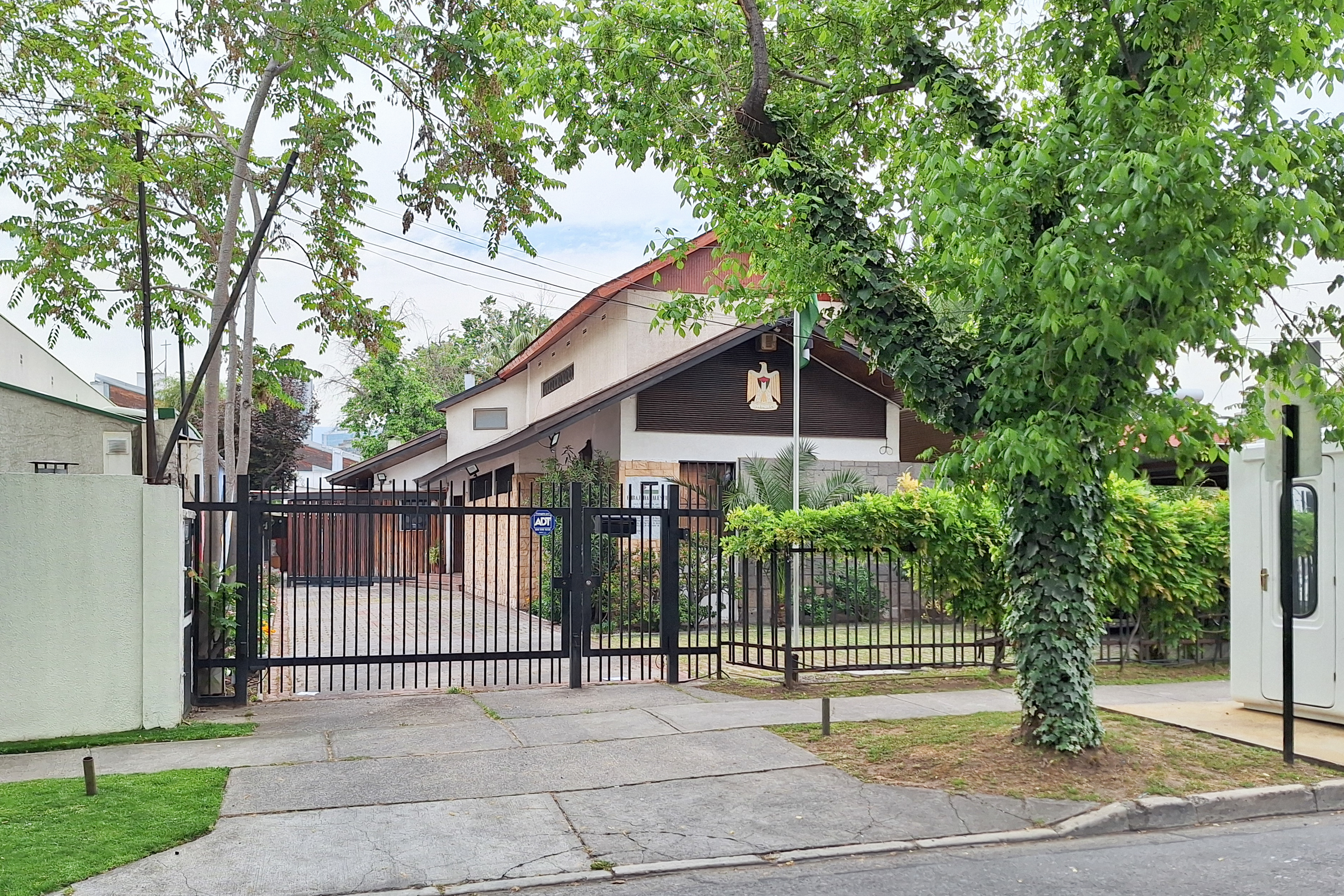
Embassy of Palestine in Santiago

== See also ==
- Foreign relations of Chile
- Foreign relations of Palestine
- Club Deportivo Palestino
- List of ambassadors of the State of Palestine to Chile
- Palestinians in Chile
