= Alfredo Moreno =

Alfredo Moreno may refer to:

- Alfredo Moreno Bruce (1887–1970), Chilean lawyer, agriculturist and politician
- Alfredo Moreno Caño (born 1981), Spanish track cyclist
- Alfredo Moreno Charme (born 1956), Chilean diplomat and politician, foreign minister in 2010–2014
- Alfredo Moreno Echeverría (born 1982), Chilean engineer and politician, member of the 2021 Constitutional Convention
- Alfredo Moreno (footballer) (1980–2021), Argentine footballer
