= Chile–Spain relations =

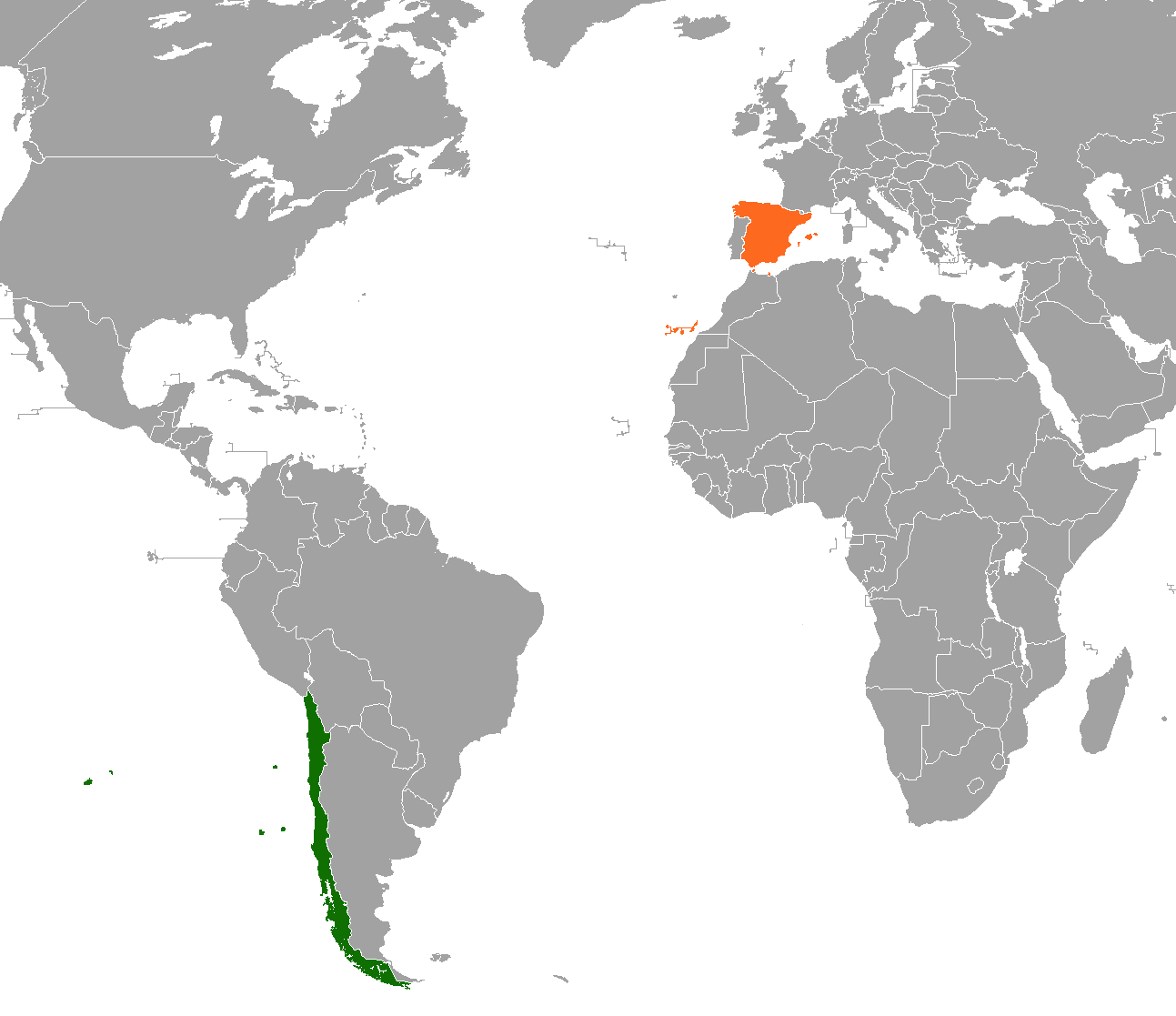
- Chile: Spain

Diplomatic mission
- Chilean embassy, Madrid: Spanish embassy, Santiago

The Republic of Chile and the Kingdom of Spain have maintained historical and diplomatic ties. Both nations are members of the Association of Spanish Language Academies, Organization of Ibero-American States, Organisation for Economic Co-operation and Development and the United Nations.

== History ==
=== Spanish conquest ===
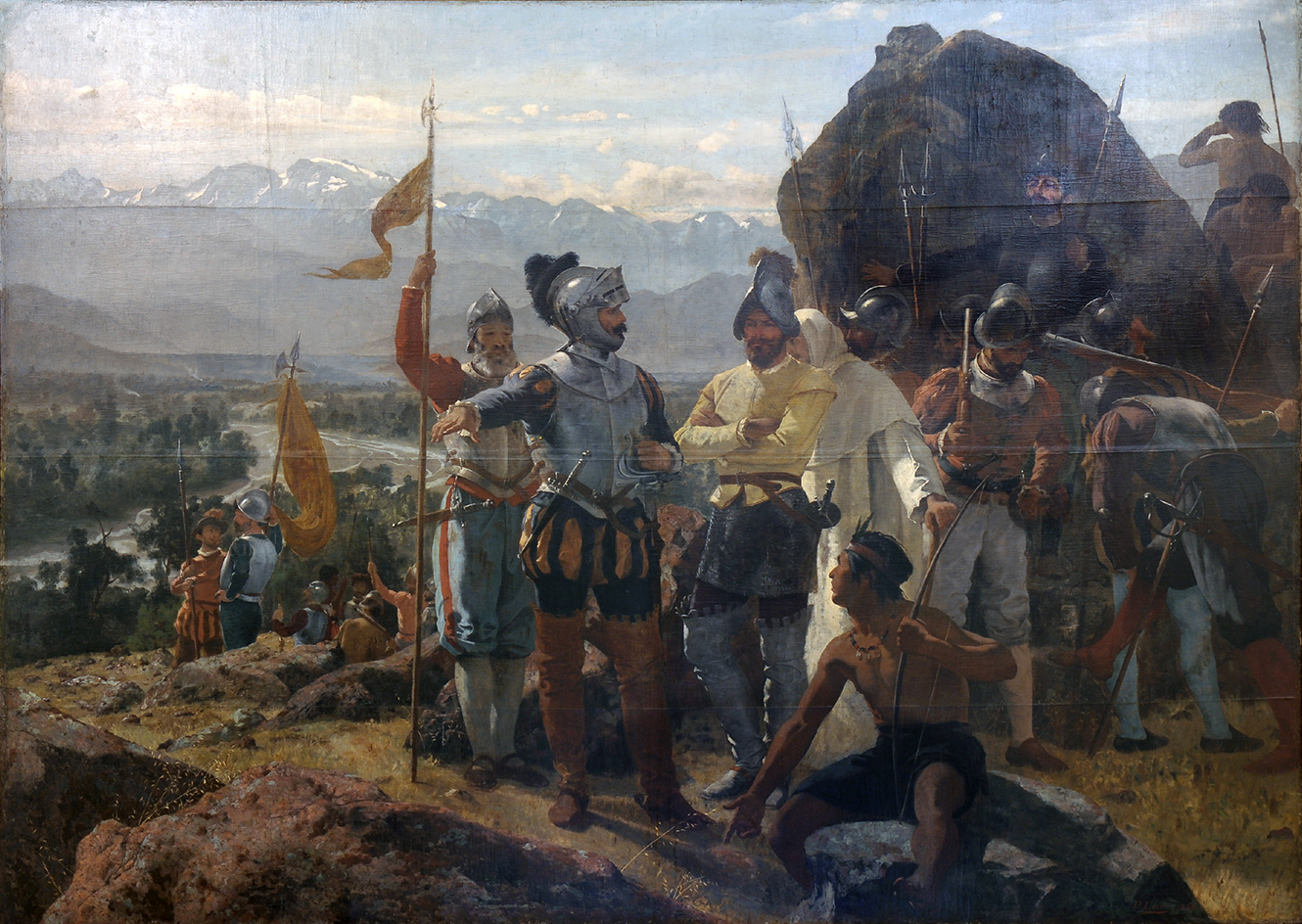
Spanish conquistador Pedro de Valdivia founding the city of Santiago

In 1536, Spanish explorer Diego de Almagro arrived to present day Chile hoping to find another territory as rich as Peru, however, discovering no mineral resources in the territory, he soon returned to Peru. In 1540, Spanish conquistador Pedro de Valdivia entered Chile and founded the city of Santiago. In 1553, during the Battle of Tucapel, Pedro de Valdivia was killed by Mapuche warriors.

In 1542, Chile became part of the Spanish Empire and was governed by the Viceroyalty of Peru based in Lima. In 1776 the Viceroyalty of the Río de la Plata based in Buenos Aires was created and Chile was immediately administered by the new Viceroyalty. Due to the lack of mineral wealth in the territory, very few Spanish migrants settled in Chile and those who did, mostly worked the land as farmers.

=== Independence ===
In the early 19th century, a wave of independence sentiment was rolling through the Spanish Empire in Latin America. On 18 September 1810, leaders of the Captaincy General of Chile declared Chile as an autonomous republic within the Spanish monarchy. For the next decade, Chilean forces would battle Spanish troops for independence. In October 1814, Chilean troops lost during the Battle of Rancagua which led to the Reconquista of Chile by Spain from 1814 to 1817.

In February 1817, troops led by General Bernardo O'Higgins, along with General José de San Martín and the Army of the Andes entered Chile from Argentina through the Andes and fought Spain in the Battle of Chacabuco which resulted in a Chilean/Argentine victory. In April 1818, O'Higgins and San Martín's forces fought Spanish troops led by General Mariano Osorio at the Battle of Maipú which secured Chile's and Argentina's independence.

=== Post-independence ===
In April 1844, Spain recognized Chile's independence, and both nations formally established diplomatic relations after the signing of a Treaty of Peace and Friendship. In March 1866, during the Chincha Islands War, Spain bombarded the Chilean port of Valparaíso in retaliation for Chile's participation in the war and for refusing Spanish ships to dock at Chilean ports.

During the Spanish Civil War (1936–1939), the Nobel Prize-winning poet, Pablo Neruda, was stationed as Chilean consul in Madrid. Neruda witnessed firsthand the battles and wrote about them in his book, España en el corazón. In 1939, Neruda was appointed consul in Paris for Spanish Emigration to Chile. In Paris, with the support of the Chilean government, Neruda arranged for a ship, the SS Winnipeg, to carry 2,200 Spanish migrants, many of them communist and Republicans, to Chile. After the war, in April 1939, Chile recognized the regime of Francisco Franco.

From 1970 to 1973, relations between the government of the socialist Salvador Allende and the anticommunist Francisco Franco were friendly, and in 1972, Franco invited President Allende to visit Spain despite their political differences. Allende, however, declined the offer. Soon after the 1973 Chilean coup d'état, which saw the removal and the death of Allende, Franco recognized the government of Augusto Pinochet. In private correspondence Pinochet expressed his support for Franco's repression in 1975 when Spain received condemnation by the United Nations General Assembly for the execution of ETA and FRAP militants. In November 1975, Franco died, and Pinochet was the only foreign head of state to attend his funeral.

In 1978 with democracy restored in Spain, the administration of Adolfo Suárez had Spain vote in the United Nations General Assembly condemning human rights abuses in Chile, thus distancing Spain from the Francoist-influenced military dictatorship of Pinochet.

In March 1990, Pinochet transferred power to the newly elected president Patricio Aylwin, and in October 1990, Spanish King Juan Carlos I paid his first official visit to Chile. The King would visit Chile on several occasions afterwards.

There are currently 60,000 Spanish nationals residing in Chile. There are direct flights between both nations with the following airlines: Iberia, LATAM Chile and Plus Ultra Líneas Aéreas.

== High-level visits ==
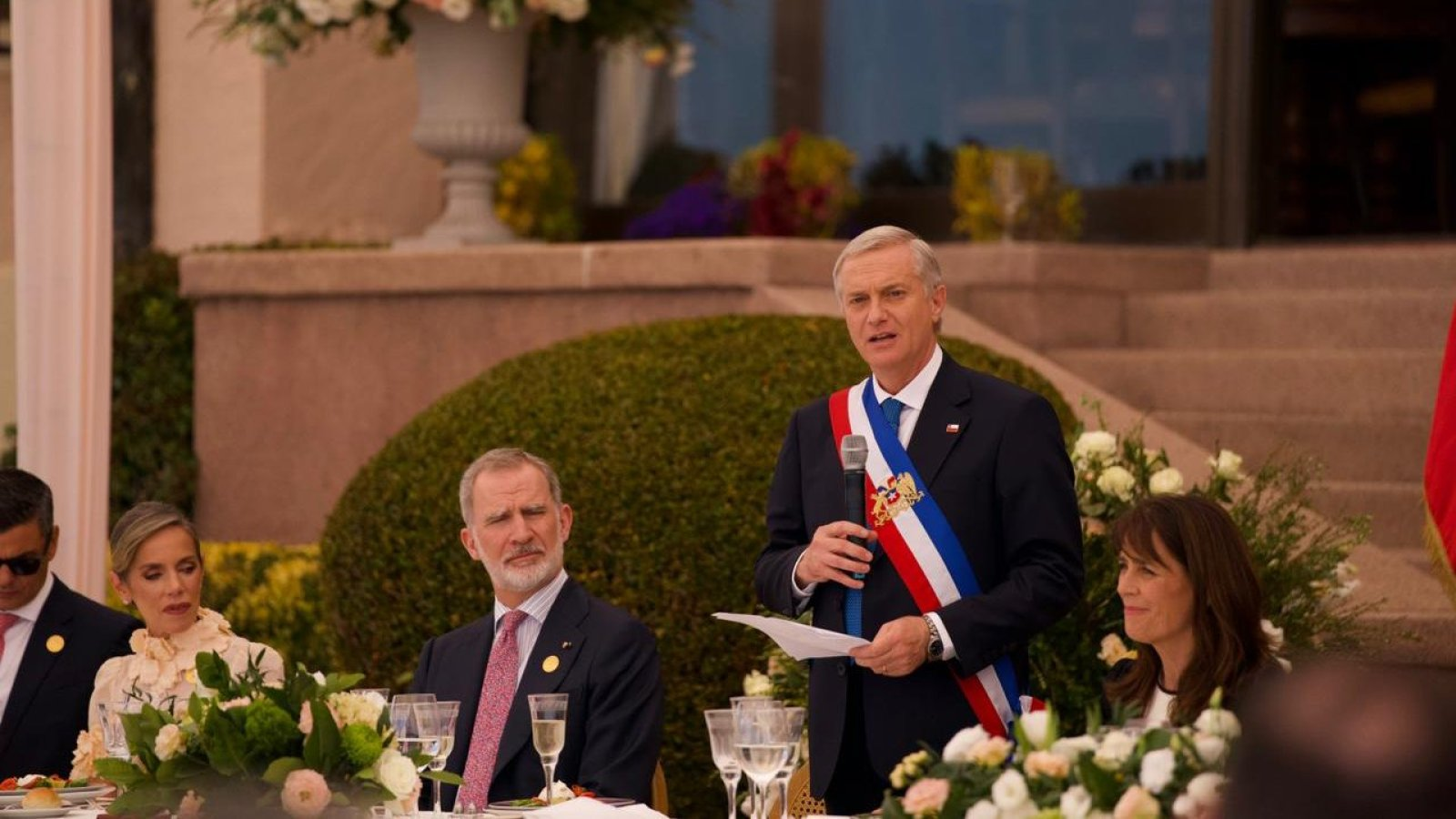
Chilean President José Antonio Kast along with visiting Spanish Felipe VI in Santiago; March 2026.

Presidential visits from Chile to Spain

- President Patricio Aylwin (1991, 1992)
- President Eduardo Frei Ruiz-Tagle (1995)
- President Ricardo Lagos (2001, 2004, 2005)
- President Sebastián Piñera (2011, 2012, 2021)
- President Michelle Bachelet (2014)
- President Gabriel Boric (2023)
- President José Antonio Kast (2026)

Royal and Prime Ministerial visits from Spain to Chile

- King Juan Carlos I (1990, 1996, 2004, 2007, 2012)
- Prime Minister Felipe González (1990)
- Prime Minister José María Aznar (1996, 1998, 2003)
- Crown Prince Felipe (2011)
- King Felipe VI (2022, 2026)
- Prime Minister José Luis Rodríguez Zapatero (2005, 2007, 2009)
- Prime Minister Mariano Rajoy (2013)
- Prime Minister Pedro Sánchez (2018, 2024, 2025)

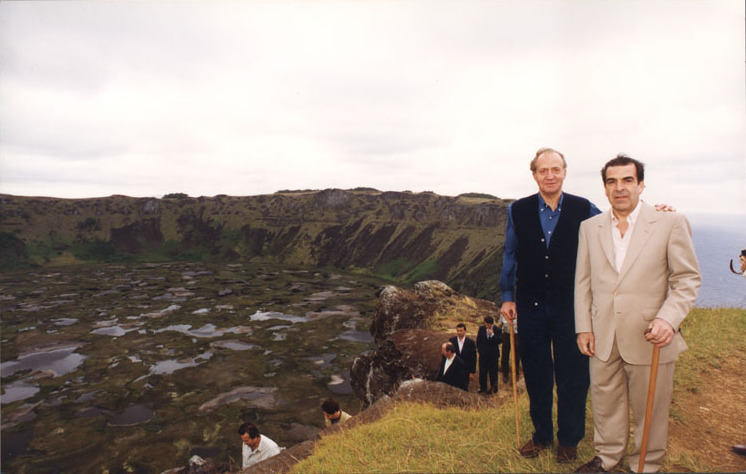
King Juan Carlos I and President Eduardo Frei Ruiz-Tagle in Easter Island; 1996.

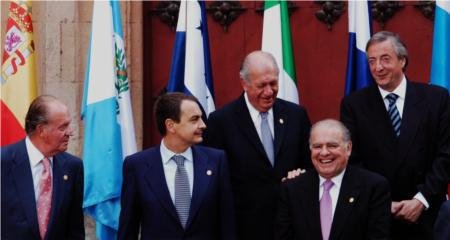
President Ricardo Lagos, King Juan Carlos I and Prime Minister José Luis Rodríguez Zapatero in Salamanca, 2005.

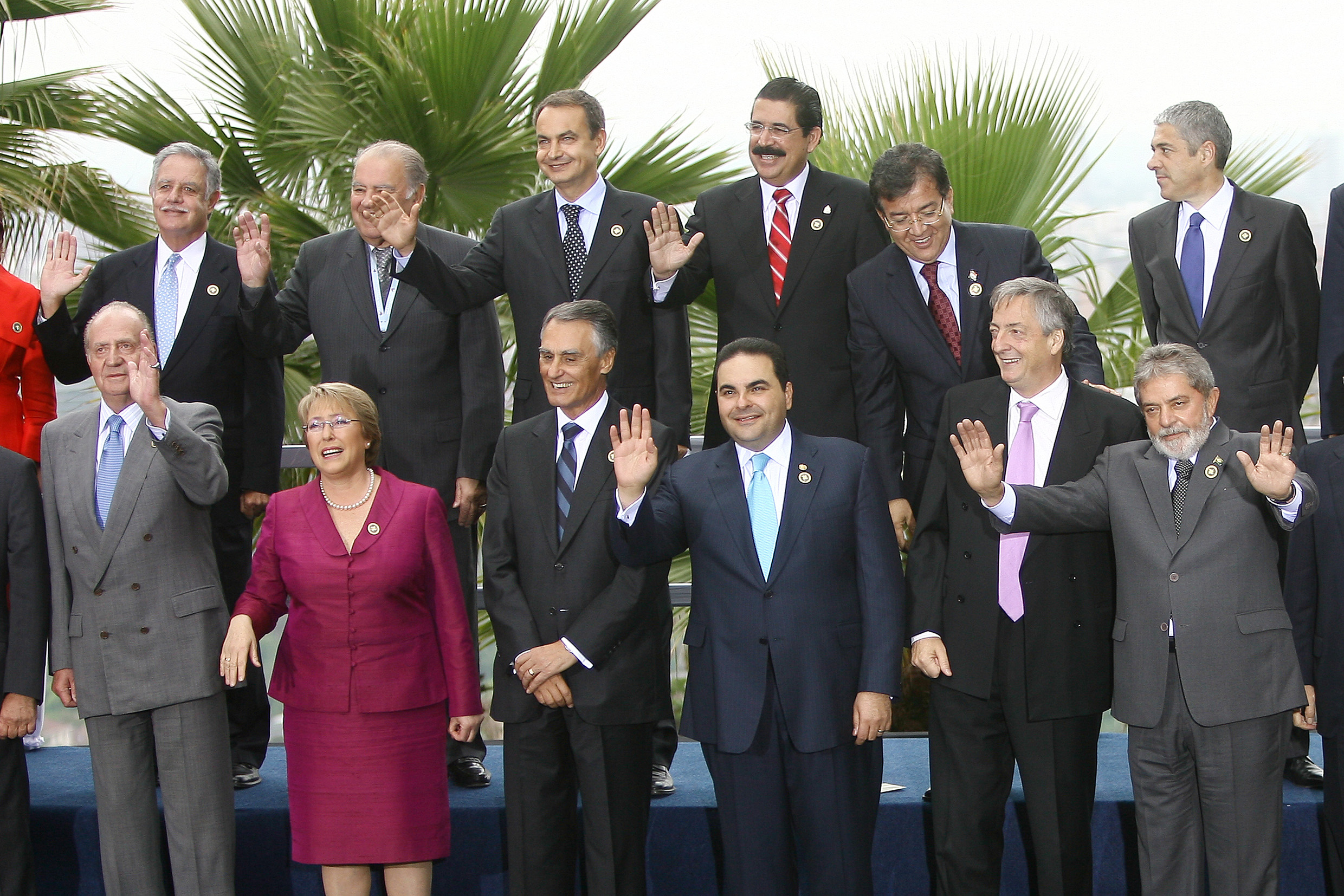
President Michelle Bachelet, King Juan Carlos I and Prime Minister José Luis Rodríguez Zapatero in Santiago, 2007.

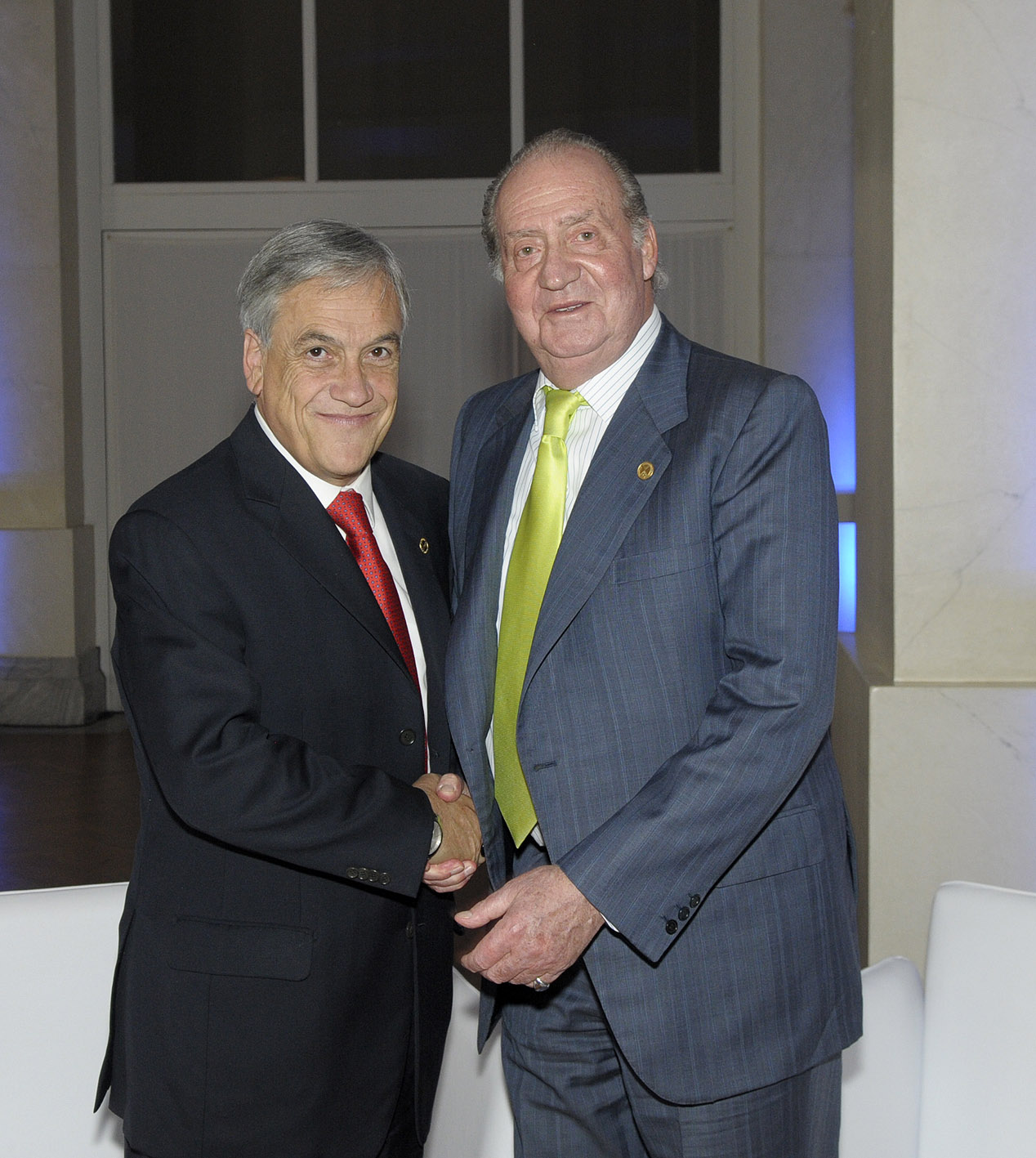
President Sebastián Piñera and King Juan Carlos I in Mar del Plata, Argentina; 2010.

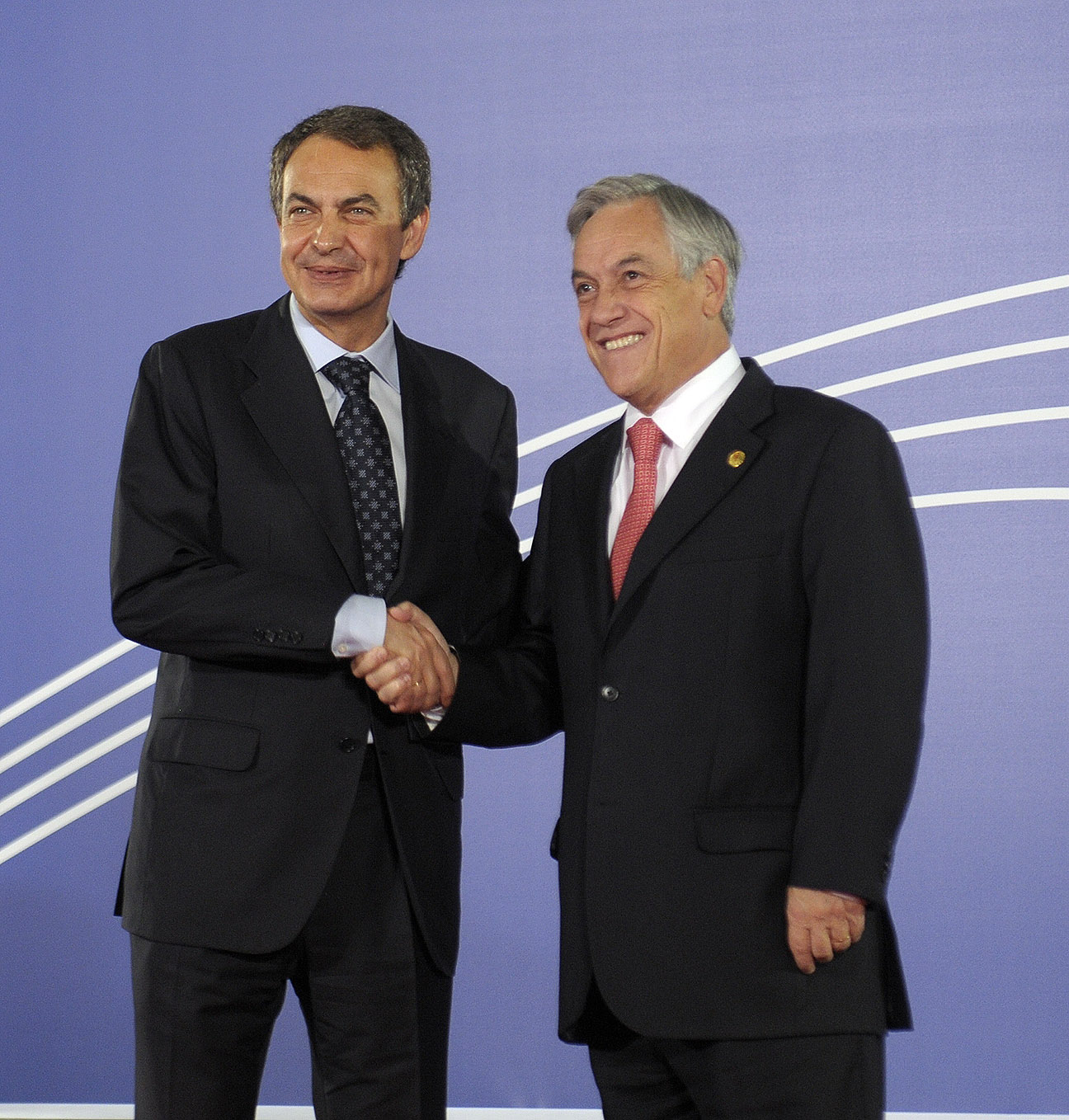
Prime Minister José Luis Rodríguez Zapatero and President Sebastián Piñera in Mar del Plata, Argentina; 2010.

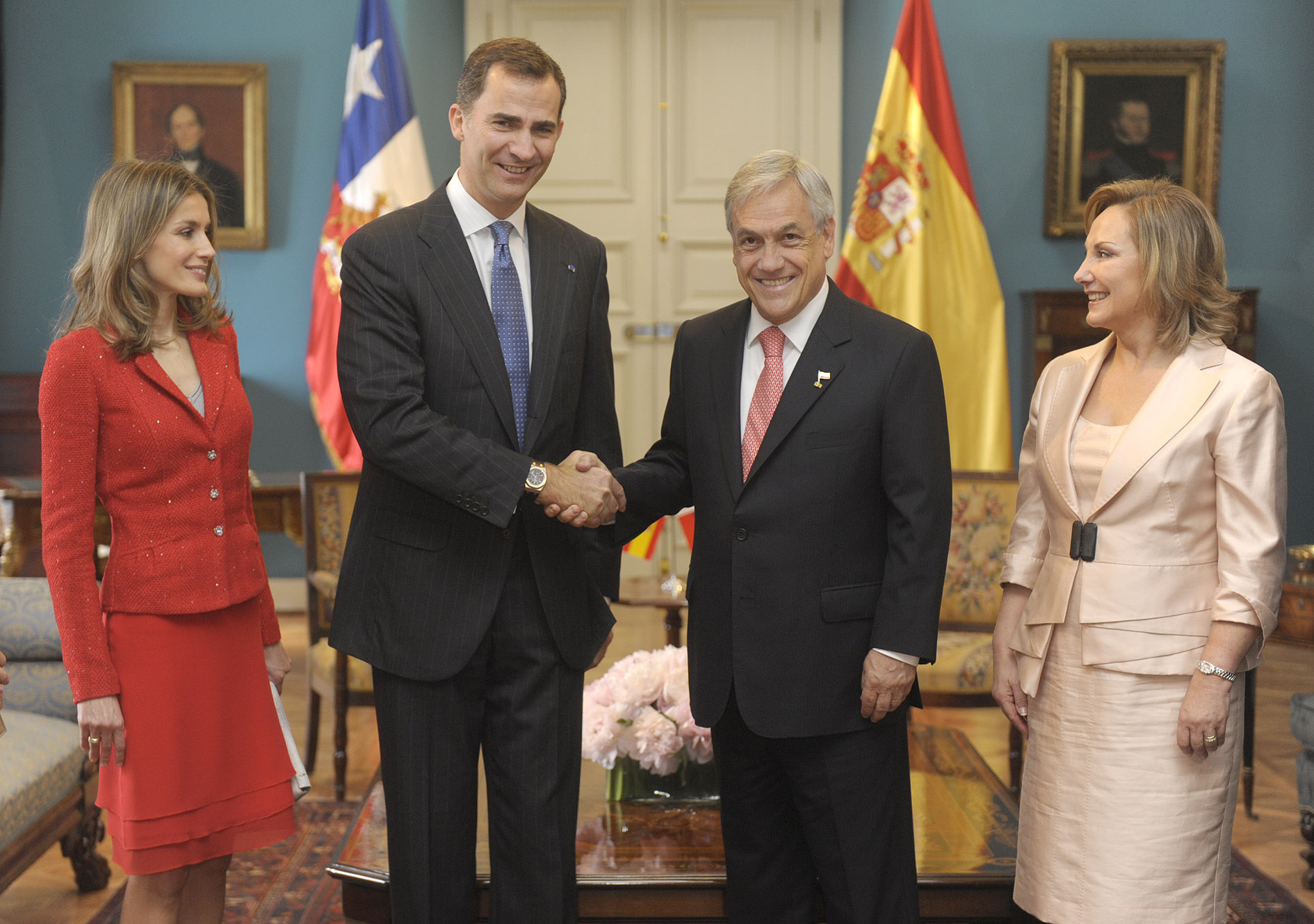
President Sebastián Piñera and Crown Prince Felipe in Santiago; 2011.

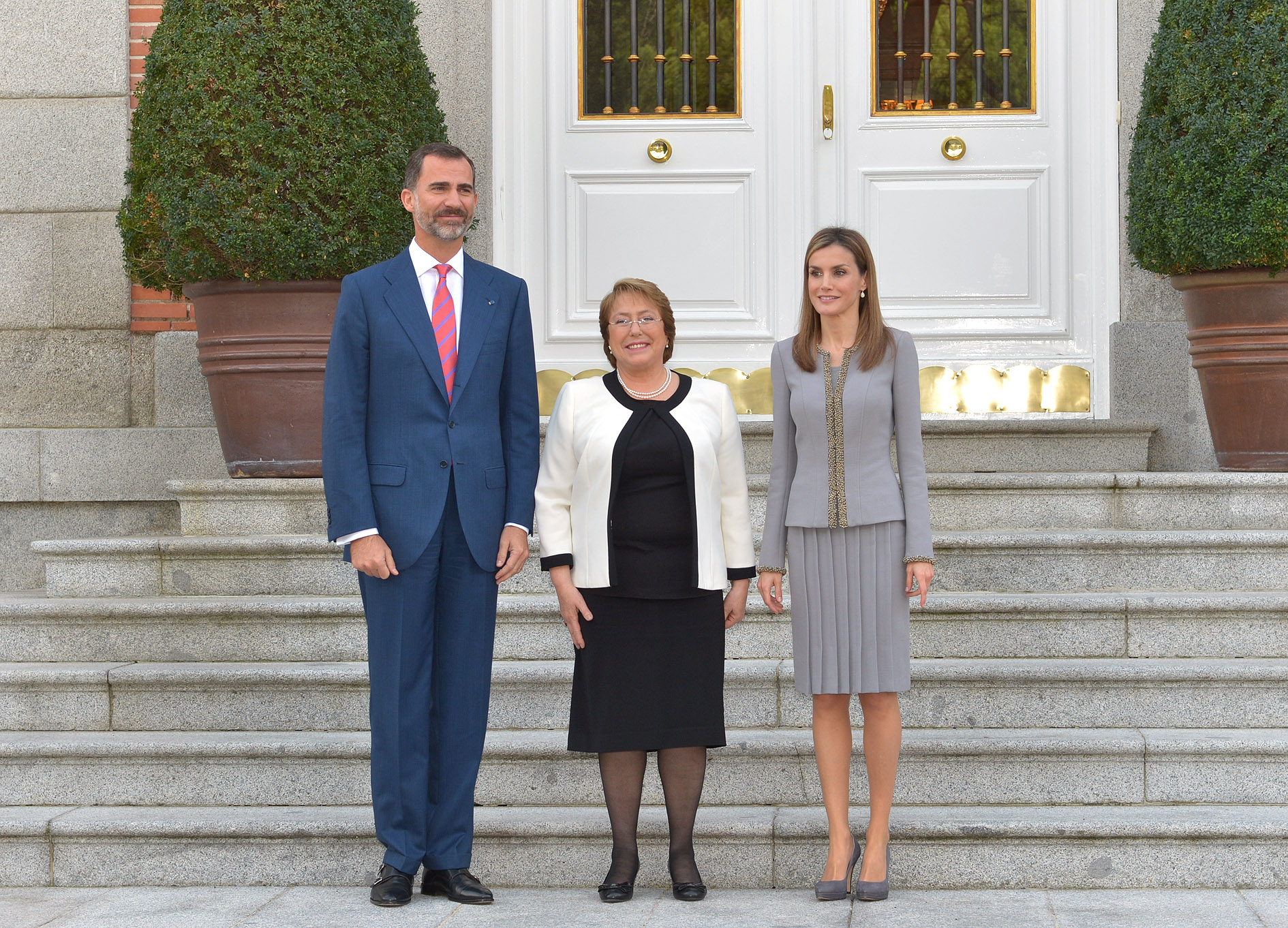
President Michelle Bachelet on a state visit to Spain meeting with King Felipe VI and Queen Letizia in Madrid, 2014.

== Bilateral relations ==
Over the years, both nations have signed numerous agreements such as a Treaty of Friendship and Cooperation (1990); Antarctic Cooperation Agreement (1993); Agreement on Social Security (1998); Memorandum of Understanding between the Spanish Ministry of Defense and the Chilean Ministry of Defense on the joint participation of personnel and military units in Peace Operations (2003); Memorandum on Scientific and Technological cooperation (2003); Air transportation Agreement (2007); Agreement of Cooperation in the fight against crime and security (2014); Tourism Cooperation Agreement (2015); Memorandum of Understanding on Cooperation in Bio-Security and Bio-Custody matters (2017); Mutual Recognition Agreement for University Degrees (2017) and a Memorandum of Understanding on Cooperation in Cybersecurity (2018).

== Cultural cooperation ==
Chile hosts a Spanish Cultural Center in Santiago. In 2007, the twinning between the cities of Plasencia (Spain) and Santiago (Chile) was established to celebrate the fifth centenary of the birth of Inés Suárez, highlighting her important milestone as a precursor of the leadership of women and equal opportunities in South America, and opening great possibilities in the field of industry, tourism or culture. The cities of Benidorm (Spain) and Viña del Mar (Chile) are also twinned, both recognized as "tourist capitals".

== Trade ==
In 2002, Chile signed a free trade agreement with the European Union (which includes Spain). In 2024, trade between Chile and Spain totaled €2.8 billion.Supported by the European Union–Chile Association Agreement, Spain serves as one of Chile's principal trading partners in Europe (ranking as Chile's 8th largest export destination), while Chile represents a key market for Spanish goods in South America. In 2024, Spanish exports to Chile reached $1.9 billion, led by automobiles ($112 million), industrial machinery, and electrical equipment. Conversely, Chilean exports to Spain totaled $1.87 billion, driven predominantly by mineral raw materials, notably copper ore ($522 million), as well as chemical wood pulp, wine, fruit, and seafood.Spanish multinational companies such as Banco Bilbao Vizcaya Argentaria, Banco Santander, Mapfre and Zara, among others, operate in Chile. Several brands of Chilean wine can be found throughout Spain.

== Resident diplomatic missions ==
of Chile in Spain

- Madrid (Embassy)
- Madrid (Consulate-General)
- Barcelona (Consulate-General)

of Spain in Chile

- Santiago (Embassy)
- Santiago (Consulate-General)

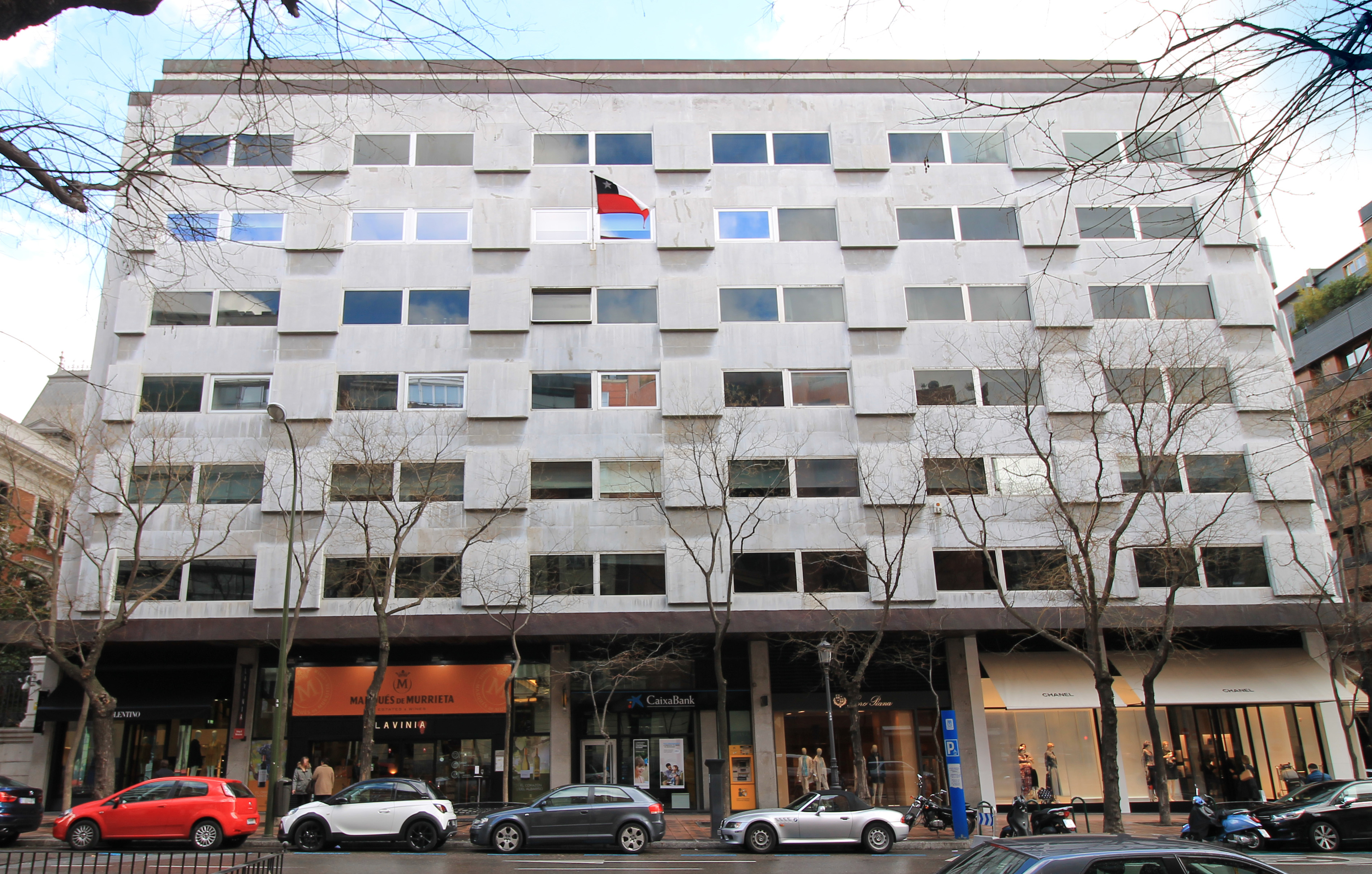
Embassy of Chile in Madrid

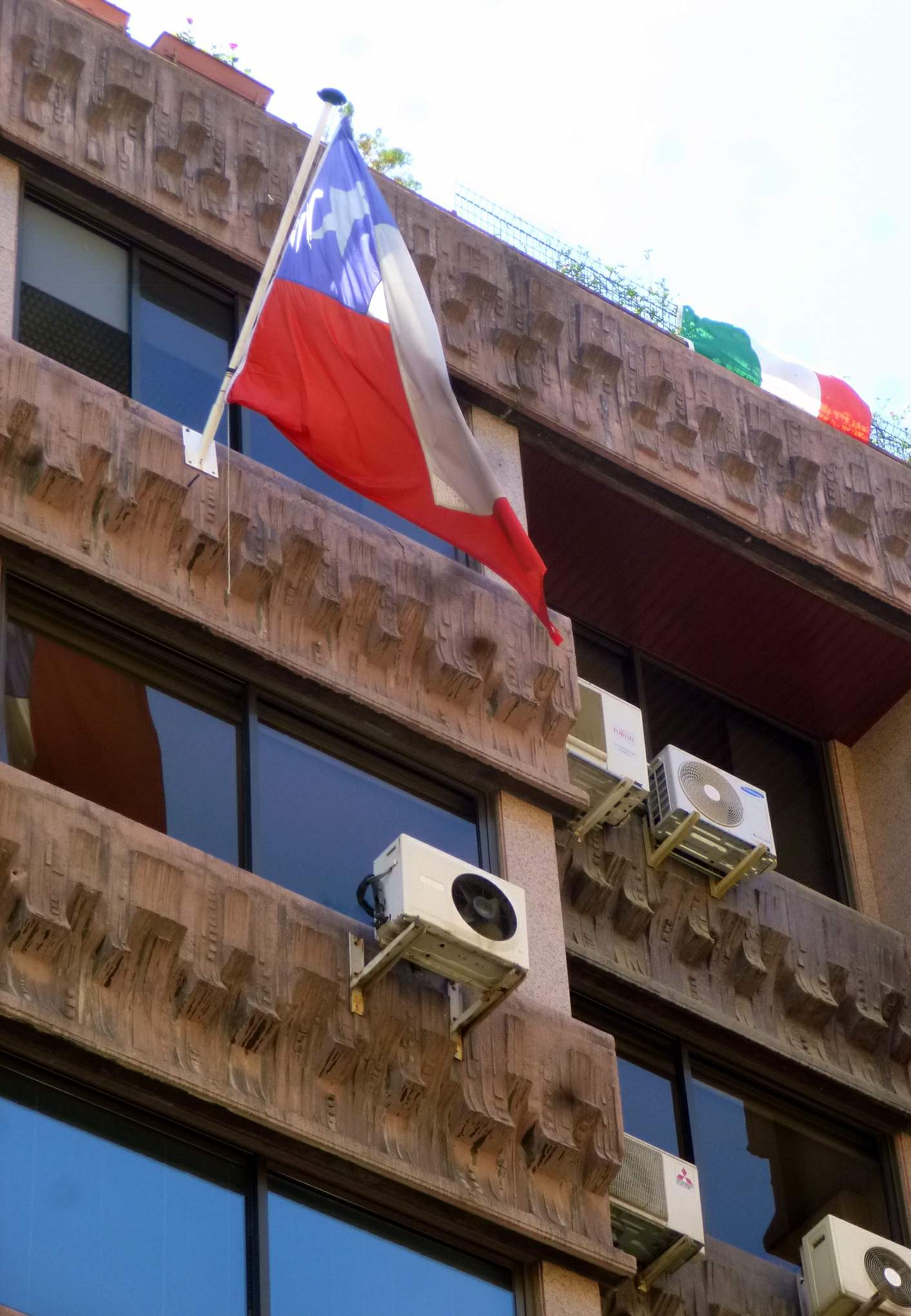
Consulate-General of Chile in Madrid

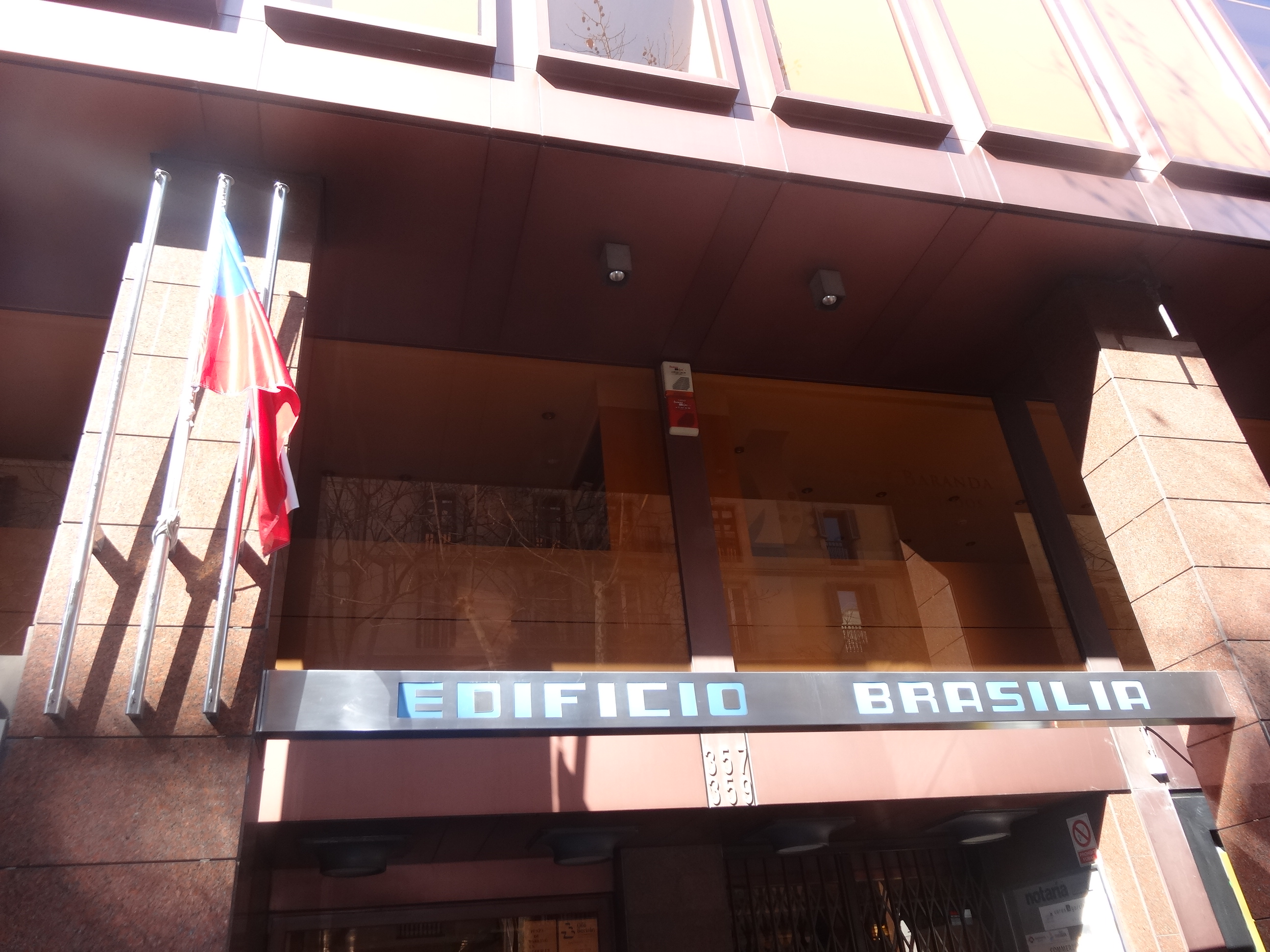
Consulate-General of Chile in Barcelona
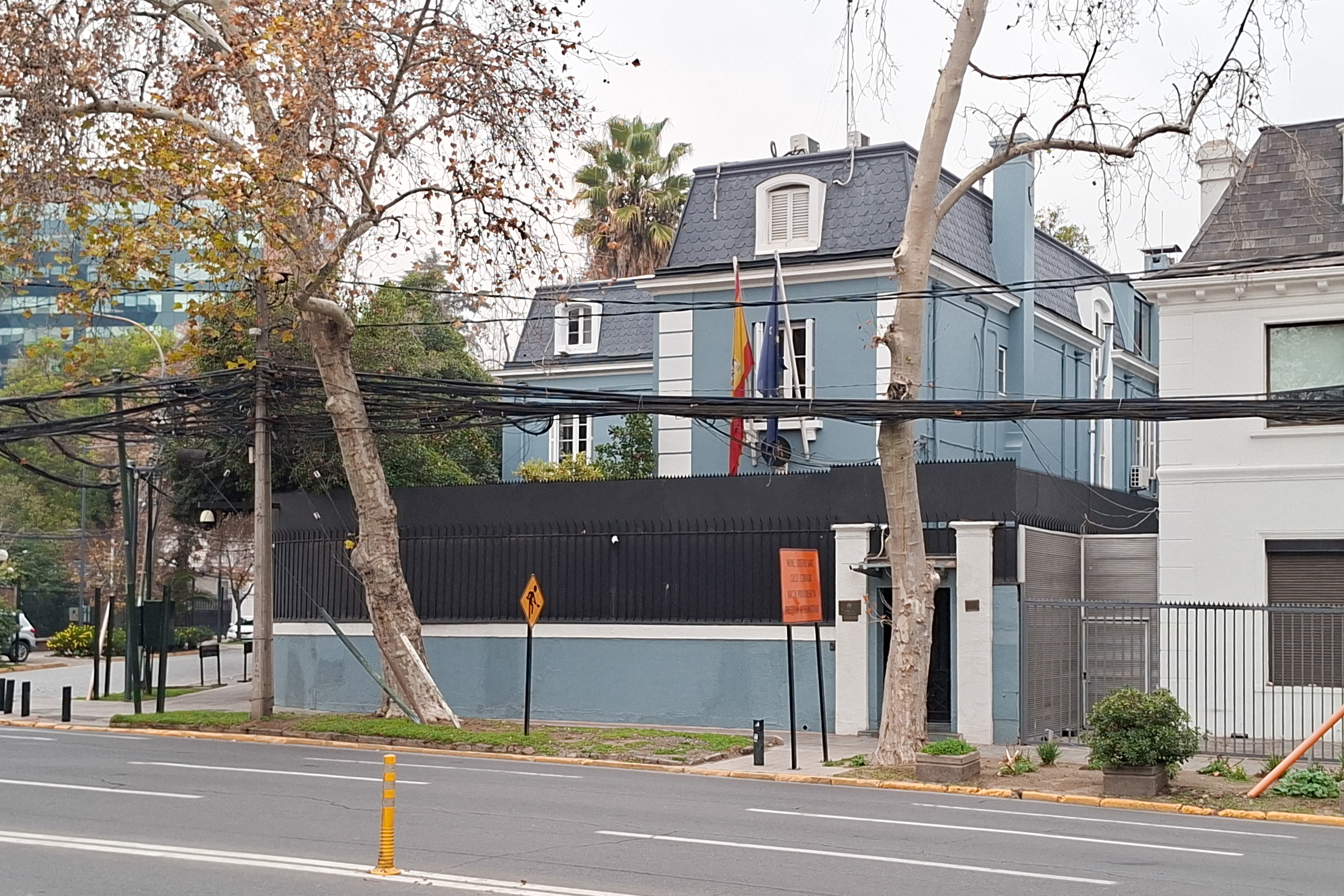
Embassy of Spain in Santiago

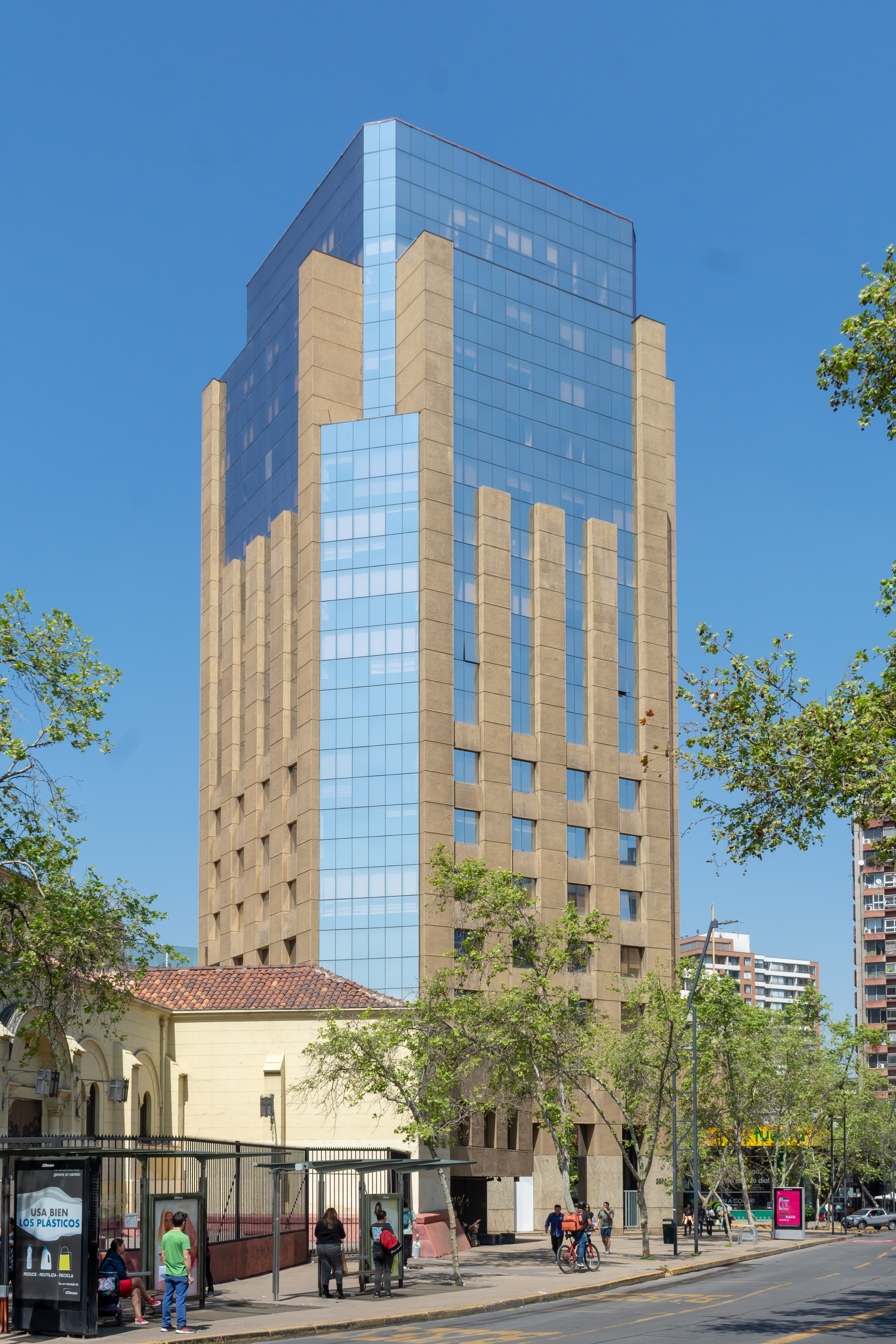
Building hosting the Consulate-General of Spain in Santiago

== See also ==
- Spanish Chileans
