= Chile–Uruguay relations =

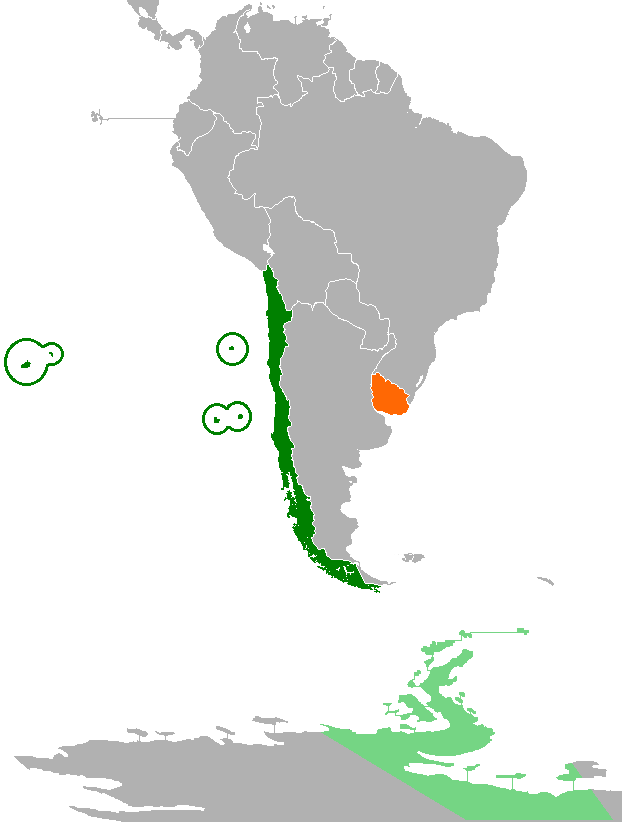
- Chile: Uruguay

Chile–Uruguay relations are the current and historical relations between the Republic of Chile and the Oriental Republic of Uruguay. Both nations are members of the Cairns Group, Community of Latin American and Caribbean States, Group of 77, Latin American Integration Association, Organization of American States, Organization of Ibero-American States and the United Nations.

== History ==
Both Chile and Uruguay share a common history in the fact that both nations were once part of the Spanish Empire. During the Spanish colonial period, Chile was then part of the Viceroyalty of Peru and administered from Lima while Uruguay was governed from the Viceroyalty of the Río de la Plata in Buenos Aires. In 1818, Chile declared its independence. In 1828, Uruguay obtained its independence after the Cisplatine War.

In October 1972, Uruguayan Air Force Flight 571 crashed in the Andes mountains carrying 45 passengers and crew, most of them Uruguayan Rugby players traveling to Chile for a match. The 40 survivors of the crash spent two months in the mountains and resorted to cannibalism to survive. In December 1972, 16 survivors were left when discovered and carried to safety. The incident became known as The Miracle of the Andes.

During the 1970s and 1980s, both nations suffered from dictatorships and cooperated with the United States in Operation Condor. In 1973, nine Uruguayan citizens were detained in Chile and remain missing to this day. In April 1976, President Augusto Pinochet paid a visit to Uruguay and met with President Juan María Bordaberry.

Since the restoration of democracy in both nations, relations have been close and both nations have participated in several multilateral regional organizations. There have been numerous visits and reunions by leaders of both nations. Both nations encourage the convergence between the Pacific Alliance (for which Chile is a member of) and MERCOSUR (for which Uruguay is a member of), with the aim of promoting Latin American integration. Both nations also work closely together in political, economic, cultural and scientific cooperation. They also work closely in matters of social development, gender, environment, energy, innovation, Antarctic affairs and human rights, among other areas.

It is estimated that in 2015, around ten thousand Uruguayan immigrants were living in Chile. Likewise, according to figures released by SERVEL, 586 Chileans were eligible to vote in the 2022 Chilean constitutional plebiscite.

== Bilateral agreements ==
Both nations have signed several agreements such as a Cultural Agreement (1968); Agreement for Free Transit for Tourists, their Personal Effects and Vehicles (1979); Agreement on Cooperation in the Field of Peaceful Uses of Nuclear Energy (1979); Agreement on the Exchange of Information on Criminal Records (1981); Agreement on Prevention, Control, Supervision and Repression of the Abuse and Illicit Traffic of Narcotic Drugs and Psychotropic Substances and their Precursors and Chemical Producers (1991); Agreement Establishing a System of Bilateral Consultations on Antarctic Matters (1991); Tourist Cooperation Agreement (1991); Memorandum for International Cooperation in the Area of Micro and Small Industry Development (1992); Agreement for the Establishment of a Bilateral Integration Council (1992); Agreement Establishing a Consultation Mechanism between both countries Ministry's of Foreign Affairs (1992); Agreement for Technical and Scientific Cooperation (1993); Social Security Agreement (1997); Air Transport Agreement (2004); Memorandum of Understanding established by the Bilateral Trade and Investment Commission (2007); Agreement of Cooperation between Uruguay's National Institute for Women and Chile's National Service for Women (2008); Investment Agreement (2010); Agreement to Eliminate Double Taxation in Relation to Income and Capital Taxes and to Prevent Tax Evasion and Avoidance (2016) and a Free Trade Agreement between both nations (2018).

== Economic relations ==
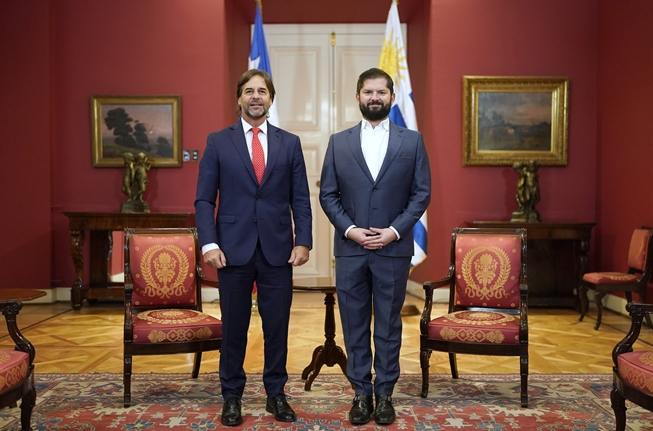
Visit of Uruguayan President Luis Lacalle Pou to Chilean President Gabriel Boric at La Moneda Palace, in June 2024

Chilean–Uruguayan trade relations are mainly governed by the Economic Complementation Agreement signed between Chile and Mercosur, with Uruguay as a fully acceded member state and Chile as an associated country. This agreement entered into force on October 1, 1996. In addition, there are bilateral agreements such as the Strategic Partnership Agreement signed in July 2008 and the Investment Agreement signed in March 2010.

In macroeconomic terms, trade between the two countries reached US$501 million in 2022, representing an average annual growth of 12% over the past five years. Chile's main exports were salmon, tomato purées and juices, and cardboard, while Uruguay mainly exported pickup trucks, rapeseed or canola oil, and beef.

In terms of tourism, due to the relative proximity between the two countries, the mutual flow of tourists has increased over time. In addition, both Chilean and Uruguayan citizens are exempt from the tourist visa requirement, and to facilitate free movement between South American countries, the use of a passport is not mandatory for temporary stays for tourism or visits; entry into each country is permitted using only their respective valid national identity documents.

Uruguay–Chile trade relations are characterized by a consistent trade surplus in favor of Uruguay, which exported $217 million to Chile in 2024 against $164 million in imports, resulting in a bilateral trade surplus of $52.8 million. Uruguayan exports to Chile are largely agricultural and pharmaceutical products, led primarily by wheat ($27.2 million), bovine meat ($23.6 million), and rice ($15.4 million). Conversely, Chilean exports to Uruguay center on processed foods and energy, headed by fish fillets ($10.8 million), processed tomatoes ($9.47 million), and petroleum gas ($9.4 million). Annual bilateral trade between the two South American nations has experienced a long-term decline, decreasing at an annualized rate of 10% over five years.

== Resident diplomatic missions ==
- Chile has an embassy in Montevideo.
- Uruguay has an embassy in Santiago.
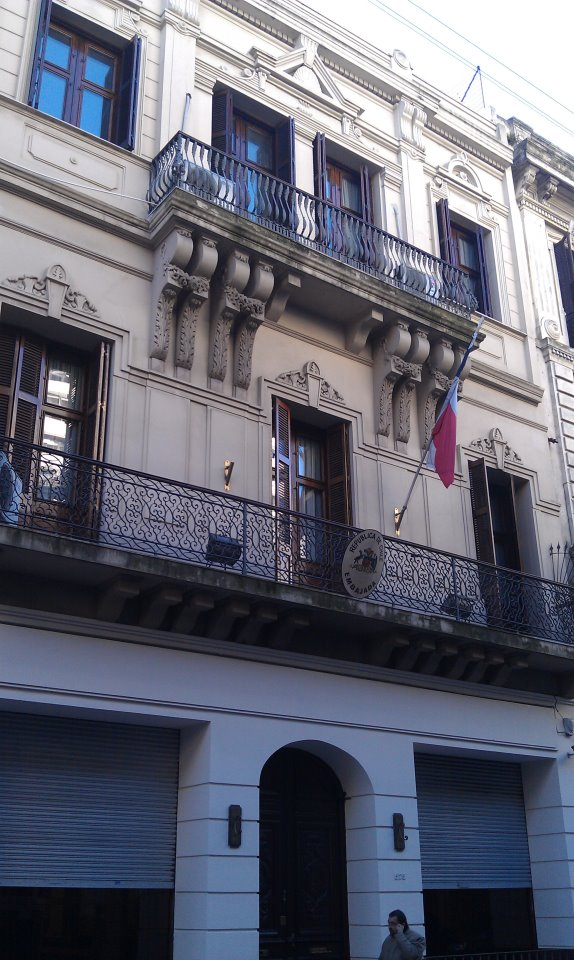
Embassy of Chile in Montevideo

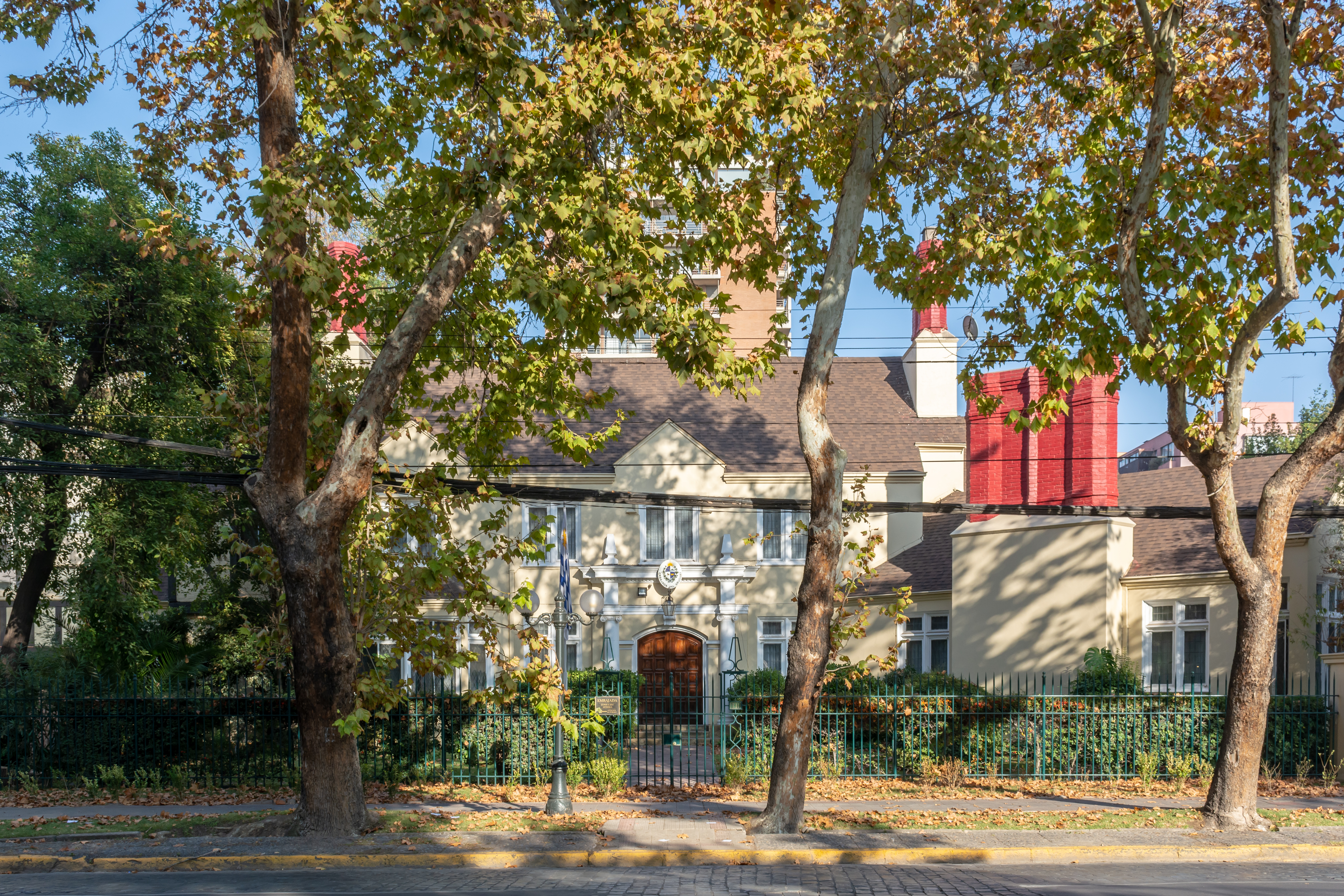
Embassy of Uruguay in Santiago

== See also ==
- Uruguayans in Chile
