= Chile–Colombia relations =

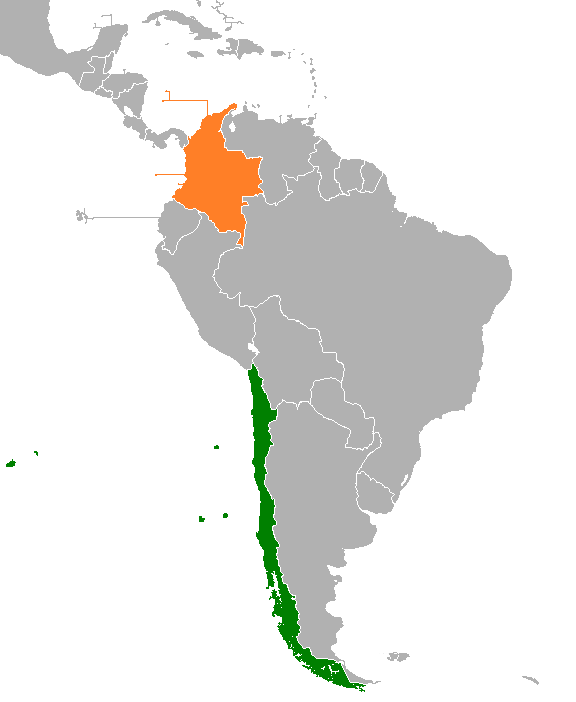
- Chile: Colombia

Chile–Colombia relations refer to the historical and current relationship between Chile and Colombia. Both two nations were once part of Spain, having shared cultural and linguistic tie developed from Spanish rule, and also embracing democracy. Therefore, both countries enjoy a close bond between each other. Both are members of the Community of Latin American and Caribbean States, Organization of American States, OECD, Pacific Alliance and the United Nations.

== Historical ==
Both countries share historical ties, having belonged to the Spanish Empire and to the Viceroyalty of Peru, although they were administered separately through the Captaincy General of Chile and the Viceroyalty of New Granada. On 21 October 1822, the first treaty formalizing bilateral relations between the newly independent republics of Chile and Gran Colombia was signed: the Treaty of Friendship, League, and Confederation (Tratado de Amistad, Liga y Confederación), through which both nations agreed to unite in order to uphold their independence while respecting their respective sovereignties. That same year, Chile appointed Joaquín Campino as minister plenipotentiary to the Colombian authorities. Diplomatic representation and contacts were irregular until 1853, when a Consular Convention was signed along with an agreement establishing equality between Granadian and Chilean flags in maritime traffic. In 1855, the Chilean government appointed Carlos Bello as Resident Minister, a position that also proved not to be permanent, until 1876, when Domingo Godoy Cruz was appointed to the same post.

During the War of the Pacific, relations between the two countries were tense, mainly due to the role of Panama—then a state administratively dependent on Colombia—which served as a transshipment point for Peruvian war matériel brought from Europe, the east coast of the United States, or Costa Rica to the port of Colón. From there, the material was transported by railway to Panama City and shipped onward to Peru, sometimes with a stop in Ecuador to simulate another destination, aboard Peruvian vessels such as Talismán, Chalaco, Limeña, Estrella, Enriqueta, and Guadiana. This contravened the Treaty of Friendship, Commerce, and Navigation (Tratado de Amistad, Comercio y Navegación) signed on 16 February 1844 between Chile and Colombia, which stipulated the “strict and indispensable obligation not to facilitate to the enemies of Chile war matériel of any kind.” Following protests by the Chilean government, President Julián Trujillo Largacha declared that the neutrality of the isthmus required allowing the passage of goods without control of their contents or destination. Arms shipments and Chilean diplomatic protests continued. At the end of 1879, the armed Chilean transport Amazonas arrived in Panama City and managed to halt the smuggling of arms to Peru until the fall of Lima.

In 1881, Chile appointed the intellectual and poet José Antonio Soffia as diplomatic representative in Colombia. His mission was to resume friendly relations and ease tensions between the two countries, as well as to advocate for Chile’s interest in preventing U.S. or European intervention in South American affairs. In this context, in 1885 Chile came to the defense of the interests of the Colombian Union when a crisis arose with the United States. The U.S. sent its Navy to Panama to protect its citizens and interests following an insurrection against the Colombian government led by Rafael Aizpuru. This U.S. action represented a violation of its obligations under the treaty signed with Colombia in 1846. On 7 April, the U.S. vessel USS Shenandoah arrived in Panama City, and three days later other U.S. ships, such as the USS Galena, called at the city of Colón. On 27 April, a force of U.S. Marines was quartered in Panama City. The following day, Colombian troops arrived at the port of Buenaventura, the Colombian port closest to the Pacific Ocean. Chile viewed the interruption of communications across the Isthmus of Panama with concern and, in response to the U.S. intervention, on 10 April the protected cruiser Esmeralda of the Chilean Navy sailed from Valparaíso. After resupplying at the Peruvian port of Callao, it arrived in Panama on 28 April 1885. The orders given to the Esmeralda’s captain, Juan López Lermanda, were to prevent, by any means necessary, a possible annexation of Panama by the United States. By the time the Chileans arrived, the situation in Panama had been resolved. The Americans withdrew from Panama City upon learning of the movement of the Chilean warship, and the city was subsequently occupied by the Colombian government on 30 April. Consequently, the action of the Chilean vessel had a direct impact on the U.S. decision to abandon Panama, a fact noted by the U.S. press, as the Esmeralda was considered the most powerful ship on the Pacific coast at that time. According to a U.S. publication in August 1885, after the events in Panama, “[The Esmeralda] could destroy our ships stationed in Panama, one by one, without even being touched.”

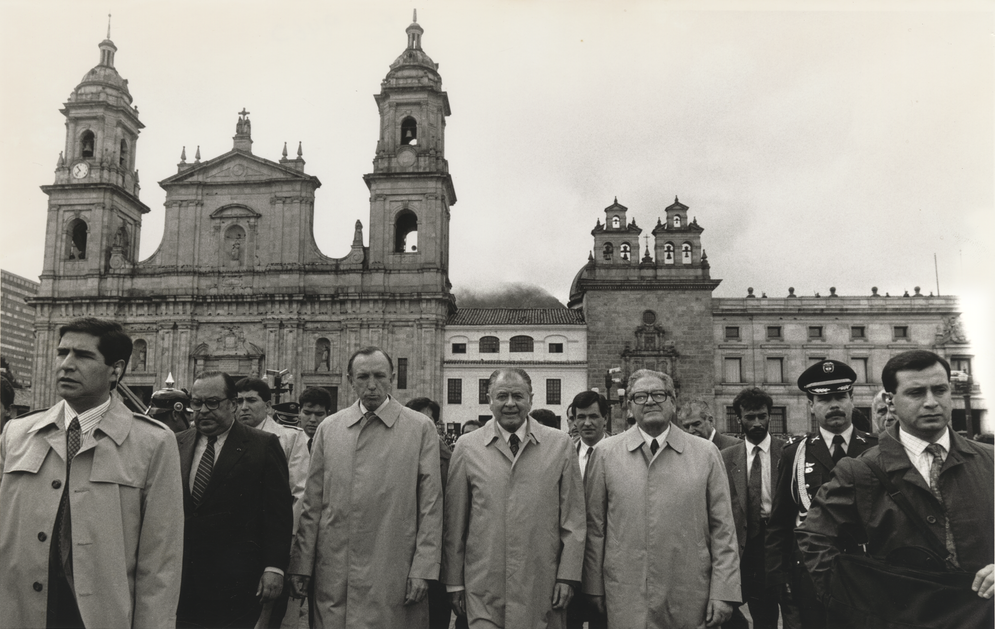
State visit of Chilean President Patricio Aylwin to Colombia, taken in Bolívar Square in Bogotá, on July 15, 1991

In 1921, both countries signed an agreement on the practice of liberal professions, and in 1929 they signed an extradition treaty. Later, in 1936, the good state of bilateral relations was reaffirmed by the signing of a Treaty of Commerce and Navigation.

In 1966, Chilean President Eduardo Frei Montalva paid an official visit to Colombia, establishing a close relationship with President Carlos Lleras Restrepo, which gave rise to the Andean Pact. In August 1972, Salvador Allende was received by his Colombian counterpart, Misael Pastrana. During those years, the so-called Chilean–Colombian Commission ( Comisión Chileno-Colombiana) was established, with the aim of exchanging views on aspects related to bilateral trade and scientific and technological cooperation. It met ten times between 1971 and 1989. After the 1973 coup d’état in Chile, Colombia’s relations with the Chilean authoritarian regime were cool, though without reaching a state of extreme estrangement. Foreign Minister Julio Londoño was one of the few to make an official visit to Chile during that period. In June 1990, Colombian president Virgilio Barco paid a visit to Chile, on which occasion negotiations were initiated on an agreement to combat drug trafficking.

== Modern relations ==
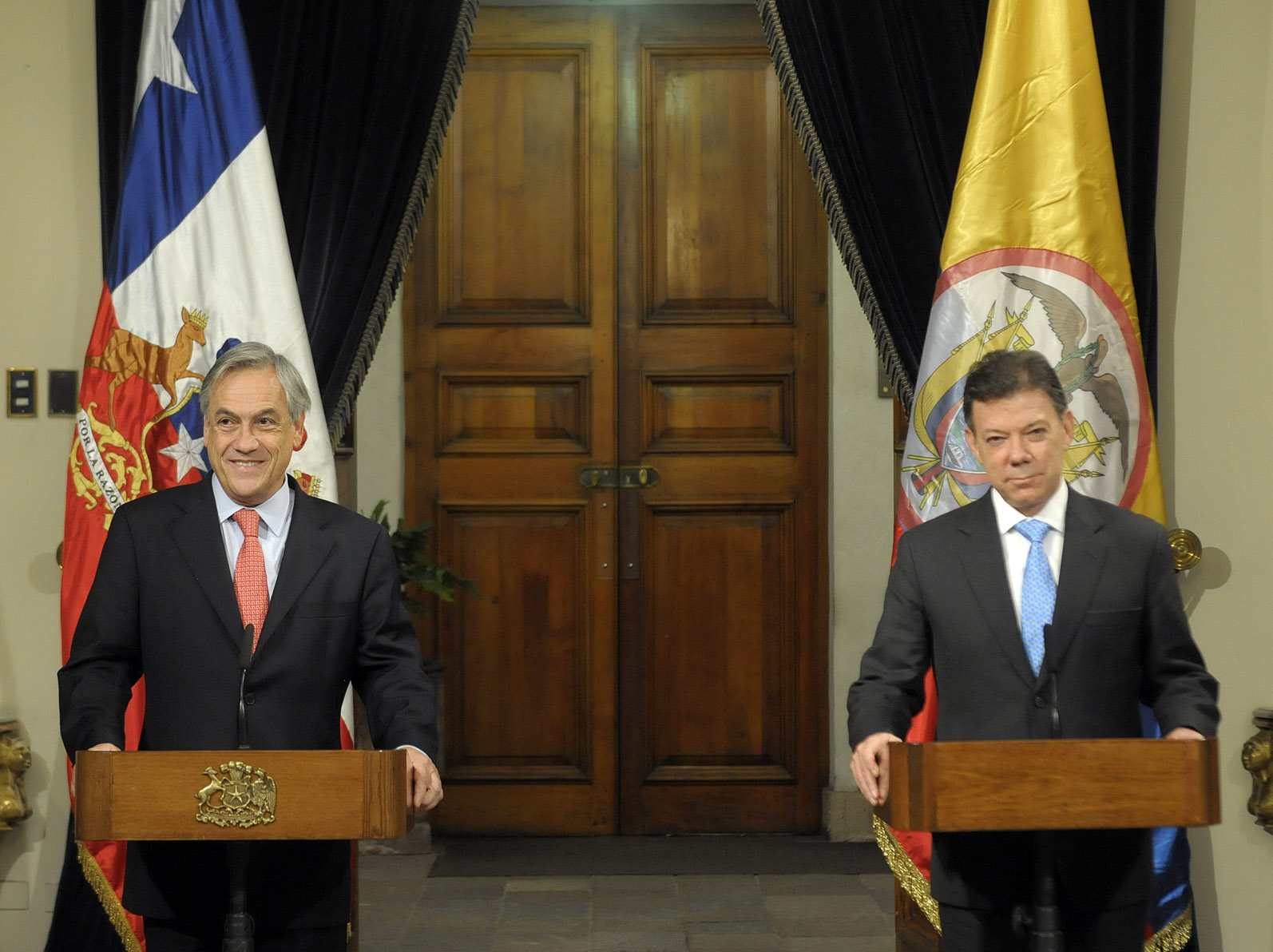
Chilean President Sebastián Piñera and Juan Manuel Santos, President of Colombia in Santiago (2010)

On 27 April 2006, both countries signed a free trade agreement. On 19 April of the following year, President Michelle Bachelet paid a state visit to Colombia, during which an agreement to avoid double taxation was signed, as well as an Action Plan against Organized Crime and Terrorism.

In 2011, both countries signed memoranda of understanding for a strategic partnership between Chile and Colombia, for the strengthening of dialogue and consular cooperation, for cooperation on Antarctic matters, and for the implementation of triangular South–South cooperation initiatives. The following year, they signed agreements on the mutual recognition of academic degrees and qualifications and on the shared use of diplomatic representations.

An important point reaffirming the good state of relations between the two countries was Chile’s participation, together with Venezuela, as an accompanying country during the peace process in Colombia, which culminated in the end of the armed conflict with the FARC. Likewise, Chile participates as a guarantor in a similar negotiation process carried out between the Colombian government and the National Liberation Army (ELN).

In 2019, the Chilean and Colombian presidents, Sebastián Piñera and Iván Duque, were the two main promoters and founders of the Forum for the Progress and Integration of South America (Prosur).

In July 2025, Colombian President Gustavo Petro traveled to Santiago for a multilateral summit hosted by Chilean President Gabriel Boric. The meeting brought together regional heads of state and international leaders, including Luiz Inácio Lula da Silva of Brazil, Yamandú Orsi of Uruguay, and Prime Minister Pedro Sánchez of Spain, to discuss interregional cooperation.

On August 7, 2026, Chilean President José Antonio Kast held a bilateral meeting with President-Elect of Colombia, Abelardo De La Espriella, ahead of the presidential inauguration in Colombia. Joined by Foreign Minister Francisco Pérez Mackenna, the two leaders focused on strengthening bilateral ties with an emphasis on security cooperation, combating organized crime, and managing prison system challenges. The discussion also encompassed broader regional economic cooperation and international trade relations.

== Cultural relations ==
A Chilean famous march song, March to the Seventh Line, is widely played by the Colombian Armed Forces band as part of strong friendship between Chile and Colombia.

== Economic relations ==
The trade relationship between the two countries is significant. Thanks to the 100% tariff liberalization brought about by the free trade agreement, and within the framework of the Pacific Alliance, Colombia has become the second most important destination for Chilean capital worldwide. By 2021, according to a report by the Bank of the Republic of Colombia, investment by Chilean companies in Colombia was estimated to amount to US$6.225 billion over the previous decade, concentrated in the retail sector, healthcare services, agribusiness, information technology services, financial services, power generation and distribution, tourism, and the fuel and gas sector.

In 2023, trade between the two South American countries amounted to US$1.894 billion. The main products exported by Chile to Colombia were copper wire, apples, and chemical wood pulp, while Colombia mainly exported bituminous coal and sugar.

With regard to maritime transport, the merchant marine transports goods on a weekly basis, mainly between the Chilean ports of Arica, Iquique, San Antonio, Valparaíso, and San Vicente, and the Colombian ports of Buenaventura, Cartagena de Indias, Barranquilla, and Santa Marta.

In 2024, total bilateral trade between Chile and Colombia surpassed $1.9 billion, with Colombia holding a trade surplus of $244 million. Chilean exports to Colombia totaled $838 million, led primarily by agricultural and industrial goods such as apples and pears ($110M), and copper wire. Conversely, Colombia exported $1.08 billion worth of products to Chile, with solid fossil fuels, mainly coal and briquettes ($450M) representing its top export, followed by pesticides and petroleum coke. By August 2026, monthly bilateral trade expanded, with Chilean exports reaching $107 million (a 32.6% year-on-year increase) and imports from Colombia totaling $89.6 million.

== Resident diplomatic missions ==
- Chile has an embassy in Bogotá.
- Colombia has an embassy and a consulate-general in Santiago and a consulate-general in Antofagasta.

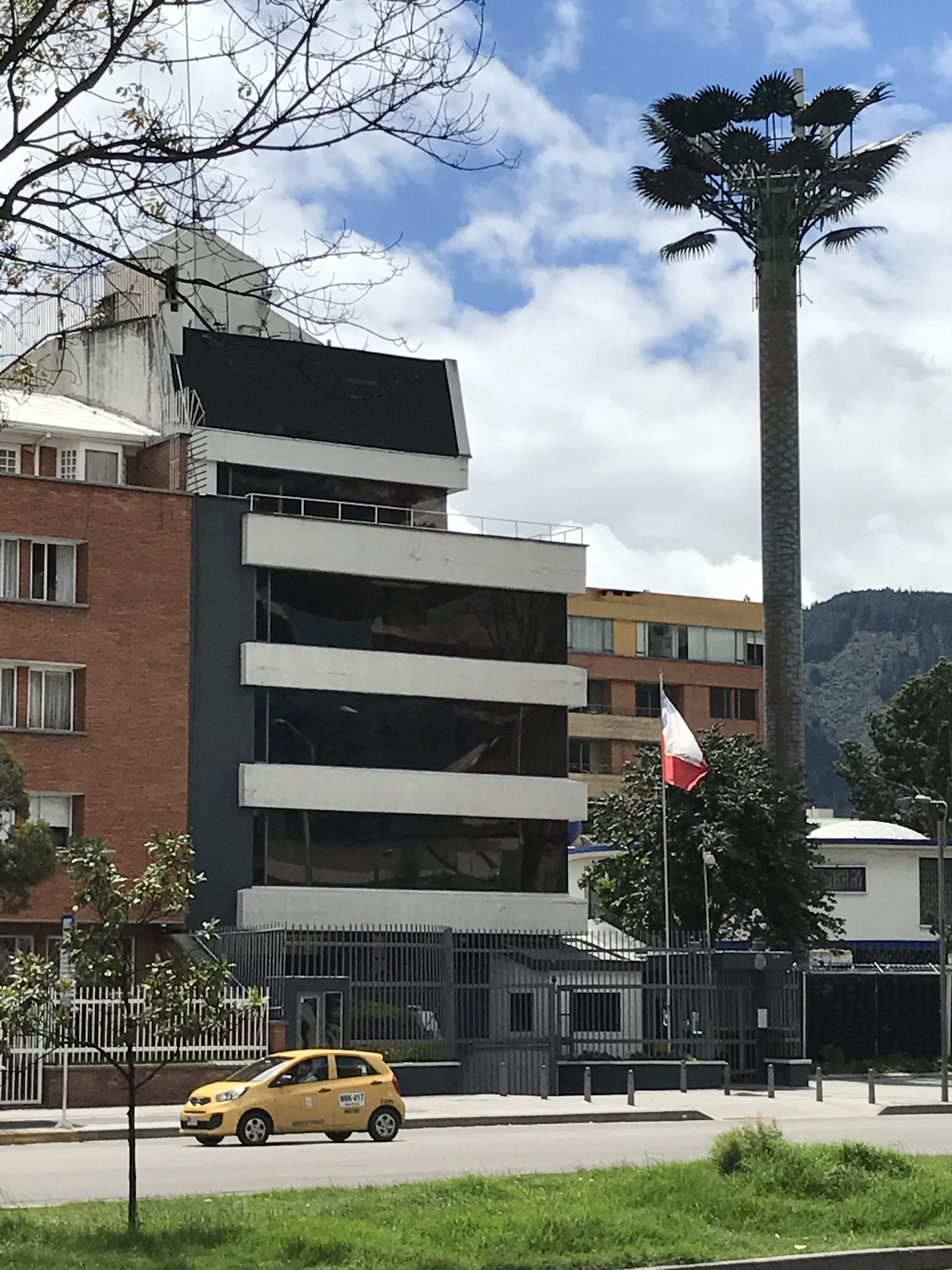
Embassy of Chile in Bogotá

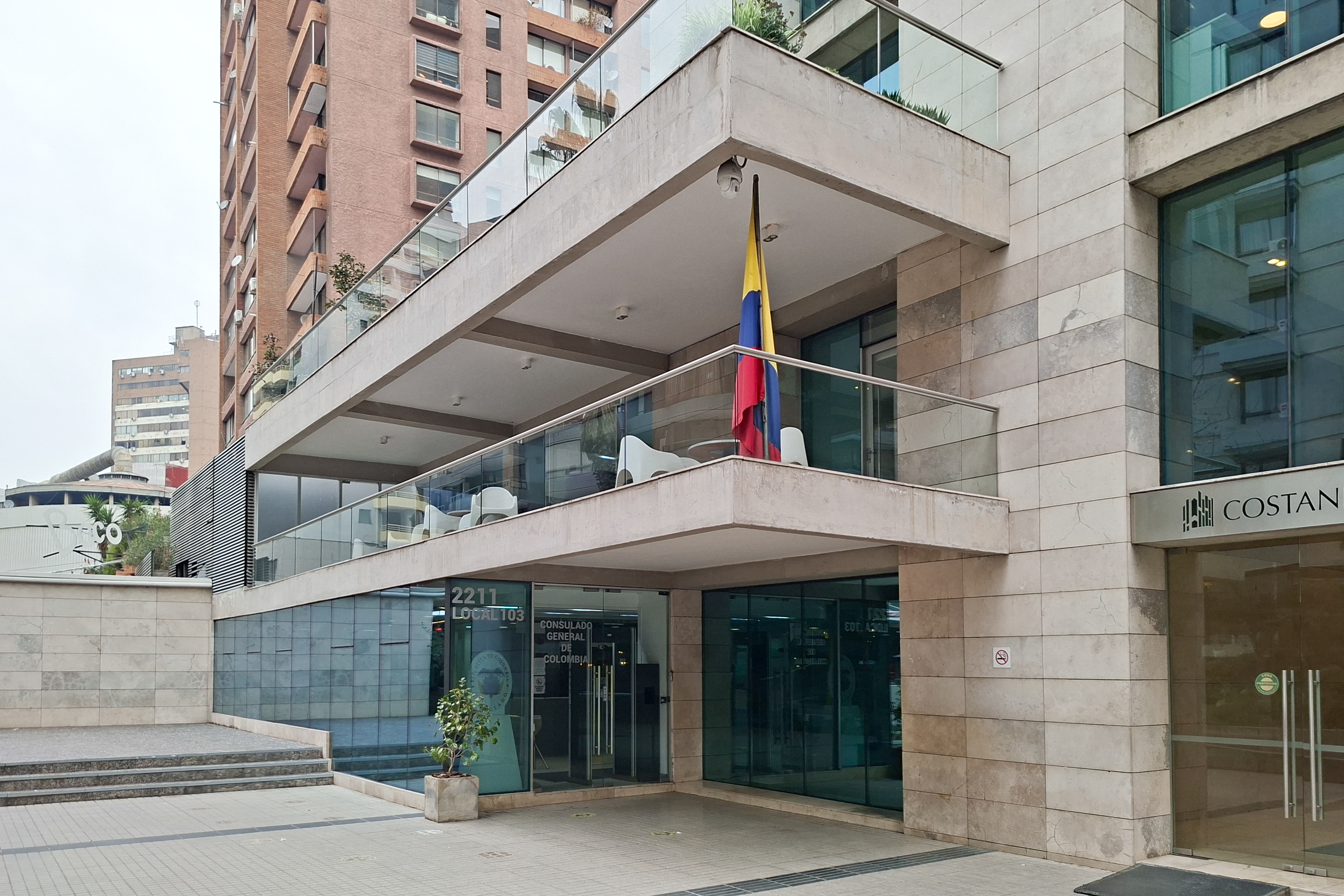
Consulate-General of Colombia in Santiago

== See also ==
- Foreign relations of Chile
- Foreign relations of Colombia
