= Foreign relations of Chile =

Since its return to democracy in 1990, Chile has been an active participant in the regional and international arena. Chile assumed a two-year non-permanent position on the UN Security Council in January 2003 and was re-elected to the council in October 2013. It is also an active member of the UN family of agencies, serving as a member of the Commission on Human Rights and participating in UN peacekeeping activities. Chile hosted the second Summit of the Americas in 1998, was the chair of the Rio Group in 2001, hosted the Defense Ministerial of the Americas in 2002, and the APEC summit and related meetings in 2004. In 2005 it hosted the Community of Democracies ministerial conference. It is an associate member of Mercosur and a full member of APEC. The OECD agreed to invite Chile to be among four countries to open discussions in becoming an official member.

== Diplomatic relations ==
List of countries which Chile maintains diplomatic relations with:

#	Country	Date
1	Argentina	4 August 1818
2	United States	6 July 1822
3	Peru	8 August 1822
4	Colombia	21 October 1822
5	United Kingdom	14 September 1823
6	Mexico	7 March 1831
7	France	7 June 1832
8	Ecuador	26 April 1835
9	Brazil	22 April 1836
10	Bolivia	1 August 1840
11	Guatemala	15 August 1840
12	Paraguay	22 July 1843
13	Uruguay	1 November 1843
14	Spain	25 April 1844
15	Venezuela	14 April 1853
16	Nicaragua	March 1857
17	Costa Rica	20 June 1857
18	Belgium	2 September 1859
19	El Salvador	10 April 1860
20	Italy	25 February 1864
21	Honduras	29 March 1866
22	Netherlands	9 January 1872
—	Holy See	15 December 1877
23	Sweden	14 June 1895
24	Japan	25 September 1897
25	Cuba	19 October 1903
26	Panama	1 March 1904
27	Portugal	26 November 1912
28	Switzerland	31 May 1918
29	Norway	9 June 1919
30	Greece	20 October 1920
31	Poland	7 December 1920
32	Czech Republic	19 July 1924
33	Dominican Republic	6 January 1925
34	Romania	5 February 1925
35	Denmark	23 April 1925
36	Hungary	7 August 1925
37	Austria	18 September 1925
38	Turkey	30 January 1926
39	Egypt	5 July 1929
40	Finland	20 February 1931
41	Haiti	26 July 1934
42	Bulgaria	10 January 1935
43	Luxembourg	22 January 1938
44	Canada	28 August 1941
45	Iran	6 June 1944
46	Lebanon	28 June 1945
47	Liberia	19 July 1945
48	Saudi Arabia	6 September 1945
49	Ethiopia	16 October 1945
50	Syria	22 October 1945
51	Australia	27 December 1945
52	New Zealand	27 December 1945
53	Iraq	31 December 1945
54	South Africa	May 1948
55	Pakistan	5 February 1949
56	India	6 April 1949
57	Israel	16 May 1950
58	Serbia	2 November 1950
59	Germany	4 February 1952
60	Jordan	28 September 1954
—	Sovereign Military Order of Malta	27 February 1956
61	Kuwait	13 September 1961
62	Nigeria	5 October 1961
63	Ghana	6 October 1961
64	Morocco	6 October 1961
65	Tunisia	6 October 1961
66	South Korea	18 April 1962
67	Cyprus	26 June 1962
68	Philippines	17 July 1962
69	Afghanistan	11 September 1962
70	Thailand	9 October 1962
71	Nepal	1962
72	Sri Lanka	1962
73	Algeria	4 June 1963
74	Senegal	4 June 1963
75	Guinea	26 August 1963
76	Mali	5 September 1963
77	Iceland	6 November 1963
78	Jamaica	18 December 1963
79	Trinidad and Tobago	3 February 1964
80	Uganda	10 March 1964
81	Sudan	13 March 1964
82	Cameroon	11 August 1964
83	Zambia	29 July 1965
84	Indonesia	29 September 1965
85	Mauritania	10 December 1965
86	Barbados	3 October 1967
87	China	15 December 1970
88	Vietnam	25 March 1971
89	Libya	20 May 1971
90	Tanzania	12 June 1971
91	Guyana	22 July 1971
92	Albania	10 September 1971
93	Equatorial Guinea	8 November 1971
94	Madagascar	23 December 1971
95	Democratic Republic of the Congo	31 March 1972
96	Republic of the Congo	1 June 1972
97	Fiji	11 October 1972
98	Guinea-Bissau	23 August 1974
99	Grenada	20 May 1975
100	Kenya	September 1975
101	Oman	23 February 1976
102	Cambodia	1 June 1976
103	Papua New Guinea	19 August 1976
104	Suriname	7 May 1977
105	United Arab Emirates	23 June 1978
106	Samoa	24 August 1978
107	Eswatini	25 September 1978
108	Gabon	29 September 1978
109	Malaysia	26 February 1979
110	Ivory Coast	8 March 1979
111	Singapore	26 July 1979
112	Tonga	1 October 1979
113	Tuvalu	30 July 1980
114	Kiribati	20 January 1981
115	Nauru	6 February 1981
116	Myanmar	22 April 1982
117	Qatar	9 June 1982
118	Bahrain	6 February 1983
119	Bangladesh	June 1983
120	Brunei	1 January 1984
121	Maldives	1 March 1987
122	Mauritius	30 September 1988
123	São Tomé and Príncipe	5 May 1989
124	Saint Vincent and the Grenadines	7 September 1989
125	Malta	11 December 1989
126	Saint Kitts and Nevis	1989
127	Marshall Islands	25 January 1990
128	Federated States of Micronesia	31 March 1990
129	Belize	15 May 1990
130	Mongolia	22 June 1990
131	Mozambique	25 July 1990
132	Angola	8 August 1990
133	Antigua and Barbuda	10 August 1990
134	Vanuatu	10 September 1990
135	Namibia	16 October 1990
136	Malawi	30 November 1990
137	Bahamas	4 December 1990
138	Saint Lucia	21 March 1991
139	Rwanda	20 September 1991
140	Latvia	26 September 1991
141	Estonia	27 September 1991
142	Dominica	4 October 1991
143	Seychelles	30 October 1991
144	Lithuania	5 December 1991
145	Laos	6 December 1991
146	Russia	26 December 1991
147	Belarus	27 January 1992
148	Ukraine	28 January 1992
149	Slovenia	15 April 1992
150	Croatia	15 April 1992
151	Zimbabwe	26 May 1992
152	Ireland	1 June 1992
153	Georgia	8 June 1992
154	North Korea	25 September 1992
155	Burkina Faso	29 September 1992
156	Slovakia	1 January 1993
157	Moldova	12 May 1993
158	Kazakhstan	19 August 1993
159	Armenia	15 December 1993
160	Turkmenistan	27 July 1994
161	Uzbekistan	15 September 1994
162	Azerbaijan	3 November 1994
163	Andorra	15 July 1996
164	Liechtenstein	2 October 1996
165	Bosnia and Herzegovina	31 October 1996
166	Botswana	13 October 1997
167	Lesotho	25 August 1998
168	Kyrgyzstan	9 August 1999
169	Cape Verde	20 October 1999
170	Palau	24 November 1999
171	Timor-Leste	16 September 2002
172	Tajikistan	15 December 2004
173	Montenegro	24 July 2006
174	Monaco	23 January 2008
175	North Macedonia	15 September 2008
176	San Marino	11 July 2009
177	Benin	25 August 2010
—	State of Palestine	7 January 2011
178	Djibouti	22 January 2011
179	Togo	30 September 2015
180	Central African Republic	2 March 2016
—	Cook Islands	3 August 2016
181	Chad	26 September 2018
—	Niue	6 July 2021
182	Solomon Islands	19 September 2023

== Bilateral relations ==
=== Africa ===
Country	Formal Relations Began	Notes
Kenya	September 1975	See Chile–Kenya relations
Libya	20 May 1971	See Chile–Libya relations

=== Americas ===
Country	Formal Relations Began	Notes
Argentina	30 January 1827	See Argentina–Chile relations Chile and Argentina were close allies during the wars of independence against Spain. Argentine General José de San Martín crossed the Andes with Chilean independence hero Bernardo O'Higgins and together they defeated the Spaniards. However, after independence, relations soured. This was primarily due to a border dispute: both nations claimed the totality of the Patagonia region. Attempts to clear up the dispute were unsuccessful until 1881, when Chile was at war with both Bolivia and Peru. In order to avoid fighting Argentina as well, Chilean President Aníbal Pinto authorized his envoy, Diego Barros Arana to hand over as much territory as was needed to avoid Argentina siding with Bolivia and Peru. Barros succeeded in his mission: Argentina was granted east Patagonia and Chile the Strait of Magellan. However, border disputes continued. In 1902, war was again avoided when British King Edward VII agreed to mediate between the two nations. He established the current border in the Patagonia region. The Beagle conflict began to brew in the 1960s, when Argentina began to claim that the Picton, Lennox and Nueva islands in the Beagle Channel were rightfully hers. In 1971 Chile and Argentina signed an agreement formally submitting the Beagle Channel issue to binding Beagle Channel Arbitration. On May 2, 1977, the court ruled that the islands and all adjacent formations belonged to Chile. See the Report and decision of the Court of Arbitration. On 25 January 1978, the Argentina military junta led by General Jorge Videla declared the award fundamentally null and intensified their claim over the islands. On 22. December 1978, Argentina started the Operation Soberanía over the disputed islands, but the invasion was halted due to: The newspaper Clarín explained some years later that such caution was based, in part, on military concerns. In order to achieve a victory, certain objectives had to be reached before the seventh day after the attack. Some military leaders considered this not enough time due to the difficulty involved in transportation through the passes over the Andean Mountains. and in cite 46: According to Clarín, two consequences were feared. First, those who were dubious feared a possible regionalization of the conflict. Second, as a consequence, the conflict could acquire great power proportions. In the first case decisionmakers speculated that Peru, Bolivia, Ecuador, and Brazil might intervene. Then the great powers could take sides. In this case, the resolution of the conflict would depend not on the combatants, but on the countries that supplied the weapons. In December that year, moments before Videla signed a declaration of war against Chile, Pope John Paul II agreed to mediate between the two nations. The Pope's envoy, Antonio Samorè, successfully averted war and proposed a new definitive boundary in which the three disputed islands would remain Chilean. Chile immediately accepted this decision, but Argentina still disliked and avoided acceptance until after the lost Falklands War in 1982. Both agreed to Samoré's proposal and signed the Treaty of Peace and Friendship of 1984 between Chile and Argentina, ending that dispute. In the 1990s, under presidents Frei and Menem both countries solved almost all of the remaining border disputes during bilateral talks. They also agreed to submit Laguna del Desierto to international arbitration in 1994. Almost the entire disputed area was awarded to Argentina. The last border dispute are 50 km (31 mi). in the Southern Patagonian Ice Field from Mount Fitz Roy to Mount Daudet that is still officially undefined. In August 2006, however, a tourist map was published in Argentina placing the disputed region within the borders of that country. Chile filed an official complaint, sparking renewed efforts to settle the dispute which the Argentine government supports and urged Chile to finish quick as possible the demarcation of the international border.
Barbados	3 October 1967	Barbados is accredited in Chile through its embassy in Caracas (Venezuela). Chile is accredited to Barbados from its embassy in Port of Spain (Trinidad and Tobago) and maintains an honorary consulate in Bridgetown. Barbados and Chile formally established diplomatic relations on 3 October 1967. Chile was the first Latin American country with which Barbados formally established formal diplomatic relations. Both countries raised the agenda of rekindling ties in 2005 as a precursor to the attempted Free Trade Area of the Americas trade bloc. At current both blocs have discussed the introduction of a free trade agreement and more specifically Chile and CARICOM have specifically noted the possibility of establishing a free trade agreement. Chilean President Ricardo Lagos visited Barbados on February 20–21, 2005 In May 2009, Prime Minister David Thompson outlined his plan to further Barbadian relations in the Americas. As part of his outline he named Chile as one of three countries which he desired his government would further enhance relations with in South America. In August 2017 President Bachelet visited Barbados and met with her Barbadian counterpart to discuss mutual areas of cooperation.
Bolivia	20 April 1873	See Bolivia–Chile relations Relations with Bolivia have been strained ever since the independence wars because of the Atacama border dispute (Bolivia claims a corridor to the Pacific Ocean). The Spaniards never bothered to definitively establish a border between Chile and Bolivia. Chile claimed its limit with Peru ran through the Loa River and that Bolivia was therefore landlocked, while Bolivia claimed it did have a coast and that the limit with Chile ran along the Salado River. The border remained vague throughout the 19th century. Finally, Bolivia and Chile agreed, in 1866, to allow Bolivia access to the Pacific and that the limit of the two countries would run along the 24th parallel. The area between the 25th and 23rd parallel would remain demilitarized and both nations would be allowed to mine there. However, in 1879, Bolivian dictator General Hilarión Daza increased the taxes on the exportation of saltpeter, violating the 1866 treaty. When Chilean-owned saltpeter companies protested, Daza expropriated their companies and sold them in a public auction. Daza then put an end to all commerce with Chile and exiled all Chilean residents in Bolivia (the Bolivian port of Antofagasta had more Chileans than Bolivians). In response, Chile declared war on Bolivia and occupied Bolivia's coast. Peru had, in 1873, signed a secret pact with Bolivia in which the two countries agreed to fight together against any nation that threatened either of them. When Peru refused to be neutral in the conflict between Chile and Bolivia, Chile declared war on Peru. Chile defeated both countries and annexed the coast claimed by Bolivia. This was ratified in a 1904 treaty.
Brazil	22 April 1836	See Brazil–Chile relations
Canada	28 August 1941	See Canada–Chile relations Since 1997 Canada and Chile's trade relations have been governed by the Canada-Chile Free Trade Agreement, Chile's first full free trade agreement and Canada's first with a Latin American nation.
Colombia	28 August 1822	See Chile-Colombia relations
Cuba	19 October 1903	See Chile–Cuba relations
Dominican Republic	1938	See Chile–Dominican Republic relations
Ecuador	1836	See Chile–Ecuador relations After the War of the Pacific (1879–83) pursued a policy of promoting friendly relationships between countries with disputes with Chile's neighbors. In doing so Chile made attempts to establish friendly relationships between Ecuador and Colombia, both were countries that had serious territorial disputes with Peru in the Amazon. Military cooperation with Ecuador grew considerably after the War of the Pacific with Chile sending instructors to the military academy in Quito and selling superfluous arms and munitions to Ecuador. Despite Chile's over-all good relations with Ecuador both countries had a minor diplomatic crisis resulting from the capture of the Peruvian torpedo boat Alay in Ecuadorian territorial waters during the war. Chile together with the other ABC Powers and the USA were among the guarantors of the Rio Protocol that followed the Ecuadorian–Peruvian War in 1942.
Haiti	7 June 1943	See Chile–Haiti relations
Mexico	7 March 1831	See Chile–Mexico relations The two nations have maintained relations since 1831. On May 20, 1914, Chile and the other ABC Powers met in Niagara Falls, Canada, to mediate diplomatically to avoid a state of war between the United States and Mexico over the Veracruz Incident and the Tampico Affair. In 1974, Mexico severed diplomatic relations over the overthrow of President Salvador Allende. For the next fifteen years, Mexico would accept thousands of Chilean refugees who were escaping the government of General Augusto Pinochet. Diplomatic relations between the two nations were re-established in 1990. Currently both countries have signed a free trade agreement that went into effect in 1999. Both nations are founding members of the Pacific Alliance and are the only two Latin-American nations to be members of the OECD.: Chile has an embassy in Mexico City.; Mexico has an embassy in Santiago.
Paraguay	22 July 1843	See Chile–Paraguay relations
Peru	8 August 1828	See Chile–Peru relations
Trinidad and Tobago	3 February 1964	See Chile–Trinidad and Tobago relations
United States	6 July 1822	See Chile–United States relations: Chile maintains an embassy in Washington D.C; United States maintains an embassy in Santiago
Uruguay	9 July 1869	See Chile–Uruguay relations Chile and Uruguay share close diplomatic and economic ties, operating under a bilateral free trade agreement signed in 2016. Both nations cooperate through regional bodies and have partnered on regional security initiatives such as MINUSTAH.: Chile maintains an embassy in Montevideo; Uruguay maintains an embassy in Santiago and a consulate in Valparaíso.
Venezuela	14 April 1853	See Chile–Venezuela relations

=== Asia ===
Country	Formal Relations Began	Notes
Armenia	15 December 1993	See Armenia–Chile relations
China	15 December 1970	See Chile–China relations Chile recognized the Republic of China until 1970, when diplomatic recognition was switched to the People's Republic of China under the left-leaning Allende. After the 1973 coup by the Pinochet-led junta, diplomatic relations were cut between Chile and all Communist nations, with the exception of China and Romania. The strongly anti-Communist military government in Chile maintained friendly ties with the Communist government in China for the remainder of the Cold War, with Pinochet crediting the Chinese for abiding by the principle of non-interference in other nations' internal affairs. China and Chile exchanged military missions and the Soviet Chilean copper exports to China and Chinese loans The friendly relations were cemented by a share distaste for the Soviet Union, the Chinese diplomatic principle of non-interference in other nations' internal affairs, and a willingness to overlook ideological differences in the pursuit of economic ties.: Chile has an embassy in Beijing and consulates-general Chengdu, Guangzhou, Hong Kong and Shanghai.
India	March 1949	See Chile-India relations
Indonesia	29 September 1965	See Chile-Indonesia relations
Iran	16 January 1908	Iran severed its diplomatic ties with Chile on August 18, 1980, protesting Pinochet regime's repressive internal policies and giving the Chilean Chargé d'affaires in Tehran 15 days to close the embassy and leave the country. Iran and Chile resumed relations on December 2, 1991, with Iran opening its embassy in Santiago, only to close it again in 1999 citing financial problems. The Iranian embassy in Santiago was finally reopened in 2007 at full ambassador level.
Israel	16 May 1950	See Chile–Israel relations Chile recognized Israel's independence in February 1949. Both countries established diplomatic relation on 16 May 1950, with Israel sending their first ambassador on that date and Chile sending their first ambassador on 16 June 1952.: Chile has an embassy in Tel Aviv.
Japan	25 September 1897	See Chile–Japan relations: Chile has an embassy in Tokyo.; Japan has an embassy in Santiago.
Lebanon	28 June 1945	See Chile–Lebanon relations: Chile has an embassy in Beirut.; Lebanon has an embassy in Santiago.
Malaysia	26 February 1979	See Chile–Malaysia relations The Chile–Malaysia relations is mainly based on trade. In 2009, the total trade between Chile and Malaysia is $336 million with the total Malaysian export to Chile were $16.8 million while the import with $148.7 million.: Chile has an embassy in Kuala Lumpur.
Pakistan	March 1949	See Chile-Pakistan relations
Palestine		See Chile–Palestine relations
Philippines	17 July 1962	See Chile–Philippines relations
South Korea	18 April 1962	See Chile–South Korea relations The establishment of diplomatic relations between the Republic of Korea and República de Chile began on 18 April 1962.: Chileans and South Koreans maintain always very good relations.; Chile has a Working Holiday Visa Program Agreement with the Republic of Korea It was at the first time with a country of the Asia.; Chilean embassy in Seoul.; South Korean embassy in Santiago.
Taiwan		See Chile–Taiwan relations
Turkey	30 January 1926	See Chile–Turkey relations: Chile-Turkey Free Trade Agreement was signed on July 14, 2009, and is in effect since March 1, 2011.; Trade volume between the two countries was US$579 million in 2019 (Chilean exports/imports: 236/344 million USD.
United Arab Emirates	23 June 1978	Chile has an embassy in Abu Dhabi.; The United Arab Emirates has an embassy in Santiago.; In 2017, the United Arab Emirates provided $5 million in humanitarian aid to Chile to assist with recovery efforts following central regional wildfires.; Bilateral non-oil trade reached $300 million in 2023, with Chilean exports led by timber, salmon, and fresh fruit, while UAE exports consist primarily of refined petroleum products, cell phones, and plastics.; Both nations are signatories to a Comprehensive Economic Partnership Agreement (CEPA), signed in Abu Dhabi on 29 July 2024 and entered into force in November 2025.
Vietnam	25 March 1971	See Chile–Vietnam relation: Chile has an embassy in Hanoi.; Vietnam has an embassy in Santiago; Chile was one of the first South American countries to officially establish diplomatic relations with Vietnam; A bilateral Free Trade Agreement was signed in 2011 and entered into force in 2014.

=== Europe ===
Country	Formal Relations Began	Notes
Andorra	15 July 1996	See Andorra–Chile relations
Austria	1947	See Austria–Chile relations
Croatia	15 April 1992	See Chile–Croatia relations The Senate of Chile has awarded Croatian President Stjepan Mesić an order of merit, to honor the improvement of bilateral relations between Croatia and Chile. While representing Chile, senate vice president Baldo Prokurica stated that he found areas for stronger collaboration in future in oil and gas research and shipyards and he expressed an interest in Chilean students' having scholarships in Croatia.
Denmark	4 February 1899	See Chile–Denmark relations
Estonia	27 September 1991	See Chile–Estonia relations: An agreement on visa-free travel between Estonia and Chile came to force on 2 December 2000. The two countries also have in force a Memorandum on co-operation between the Ministries of Foreign Affairs. Agreements on cultural, tourism, and IT cooperation are being readied.; Chile is among Estonia's most important foreign trade partners in South America.; In 2007, trade between Estonia and Chile was valued at 6.3 million EUR. Estonian exports included mainly machinery, mechanical equipment, and mineral fuels; Chile exports included mainly wine, fish, crustaceans and fruit. In 2004, 83% of Chile exports to Estonia, then totaling 2.4 million EUR, consisted of wine.; In 2006, Estonia and Chile issued the joint Antarctic themed stamp series, designed by Ülle Marks and Jüri Kass, bearing images of the Emperor penguin and the minke whale.
Finland	20 February 1931	See Chile–Finland relations Chile recognised Finland's independence on June 17, 1919. Diplomatic relations between them were established in 1931 and have been continuously maintained, despite pressures at times to discontinue them. The two countries maintain resident ambassadors in both capitals.: Chile has an embassy in Helsinki.
France	15 September 1846	See Chile–France relations
Germany	24 September 1863	See Chile–Germany relations
Greece	1 July 1941	See Chile–Greece relations
Ireland	1 June 1992	See Chile–Ireland relations: Chile has an embassy in Dublin.; Ireland has an embassy in Santiago.
Italy	28 June 1856	See Chile–Italy relations
Norway	9 June 1919	See Chile–Norway relations
Poland	7 December 1920	See Chile–Poland relations
Portugal	28 February 1879	See Chile–Portugal relations
Romania	5 February 1925	See Chile–Romania relations
Russia	26 December 1991	See Chile–Russia relations: Chile has an embassy in Moscow.; Russia has an embassy in Santiago.
Serbia	1935	Both countries have established diplomatic relations 1935. They were renewed in 1946. Diplomatic relations were broken off on two occasions, in 1947 and 1973, and the last renewal was in March 1990.; A number of bilateral agreements in various fields have been concluded and are in force between both countries.
Spain	12 June 1883	See Chile–Spain relations: Chile has an embassy in Madrid and a consulate-general in Barcelona.; Spain has an embassy in Santiago.
Sweden	14 June 1895	See Chile–Sweden relations: Chile has an embassy in Stockholm and a consulate in Gothenburg.; Sweden has an embassy in Santiago.
Ukraine		See Chile–Ukraine relations
United Kingdom	14 September 1823	See Chile–United Kingdom relations Chile established diplomatic relations with the United Kingdom on 14 September 1823.: Chile maintains an embassy in London.; The United Kingdom is accredited to Chile through its embassy in Santiago.; Both countries share common membership of CPTPP, the International Criminal Court, OECD, the United Nations, and the World Trade Organization. Bilaterally the two countries have an Association Agreement, and a Double Taxation Convention.: Chile supported Britain politically, to a degree during the Falklands War. Britain supported the dictator Pinochet, granting him asylum, and even returning him back to Chile after numerous requests for criminal extradition by Spain, Argentina, Peru, and many other countries.; Chile has typically been Britain's strongest partner in South America. Britain has played an important role in shaping Chile's politics and government, throughout the ages (especially in its fight for independence)

=== Oceania ===
Country	Formal Relations Began	Notes
Australia	27 December 1945	See Australia–Chile relations
New Zealand	1948	See Chile–New Zealand relations: Chile has an embassy in Wellington.; New Zealand has an embassy in Santiago.

== See also ==
- List of diplomatic missions in Chile
- List of diplomatic missions of Chile
- Visa requirements for Chilean citizens
- Maximum neighbor hypothesis
