= List of ambassadors of Romania to Chile =

Coordinates: 33.412607°S 70.600722°W

Ambassador of Romania to Chile
- Ambasadorul român în Chile
- Coat of arms of Romania
- Incumbent; Monica-Mihaela Ştirbu since August 5, 2016
- Inaugural holder: Nicolás Dianu
- Formation: 1935

The Romanian Ambassador in Santiago de Chile is the official representative of the Government in Bucharest to the Government of Chile.

== List of ambassadors ==
Diplomatic agrément/Diplomatic accreditation	Ambassador	Observations	List of heads of state of Romania	List of presidents of Chile	Term end
1935	Nicolás Dianu	From June 24, 1938 to 1939 he was envoy in Moscow.	Carol II of Romania	Carlos Dávila	
August 25, 1938	Constantin Vallinaresco		Carol II of Romania	Pedro Aguirre Cerda	
April 14, 1965	Dumitru Fara	Dumitru Fara made a trip to Chile with the objectives of finalizing the cartel	Chivu Stoica	Eduardo Frei Montalva	April 30, 1965
1969	Vasil Dumitrescu	Grigore Preoteasa's closest friend was Vasile Dumitrescu, director of Agerpres, then Ambassador of Romania to Switzerland and until retirement in Chile.	Nicolae Ceaușescu	Eduardo Frei Montalva	
1969	Víctor Florescu	Victor Torynopol. On his true name, Victor Cornel Florescu, he was born in Lugoj on Christmas Eve of 1922. In Lugoj he will graduate from the primary school and the "Brediceanu" High School, where he will take the baccalaureate. In full war (1942-45), he goes to Bucharest, where he will attend the courses at the Higher Cooperative School. He remains in the Capital, where he is promoted to the National Cooperative Institute (1945-1947) and to the National Bank (1947-1948). In 1950, he entered the Faculty of Letters of the University of Bucharest.	Nicolae Ceaușescu	Eduardo Frei Montalva	
1985	Gheorge Petre	Chargé d'affaires	Nicolae Ceaușescu	Augusto Pinochet	
1990	Constantin Eftimie		Ion Iliescu	Patricio Aylwin	
April 12, 1991	Constantin Tunsanu		Ion Iliescu	Patricio Aylwin	
July 18, 1994	Vasile Dan		Ion Iliescu	Eduardo Frei Ruiz-Tagle	
2000	Ion Vîlcu	From 2013 to 2016 he was Romanian ambassador to Spain	Ion Iliescu	Ricardo Lagos	
2006	Valentín Florea		Traian Băsescu	Michelle Bachelet	
June 30, 2010	Florin Angelo Florian		Traian Băsescu	Sebastián Piñera	May 23, 2016
August 5, 2016	Monica-Mihaela Ştirbu		Klaus Iohannis	Sebastián Piñera	

- Chile–Romania relations
