= Chile–United Arab Emirates relations =

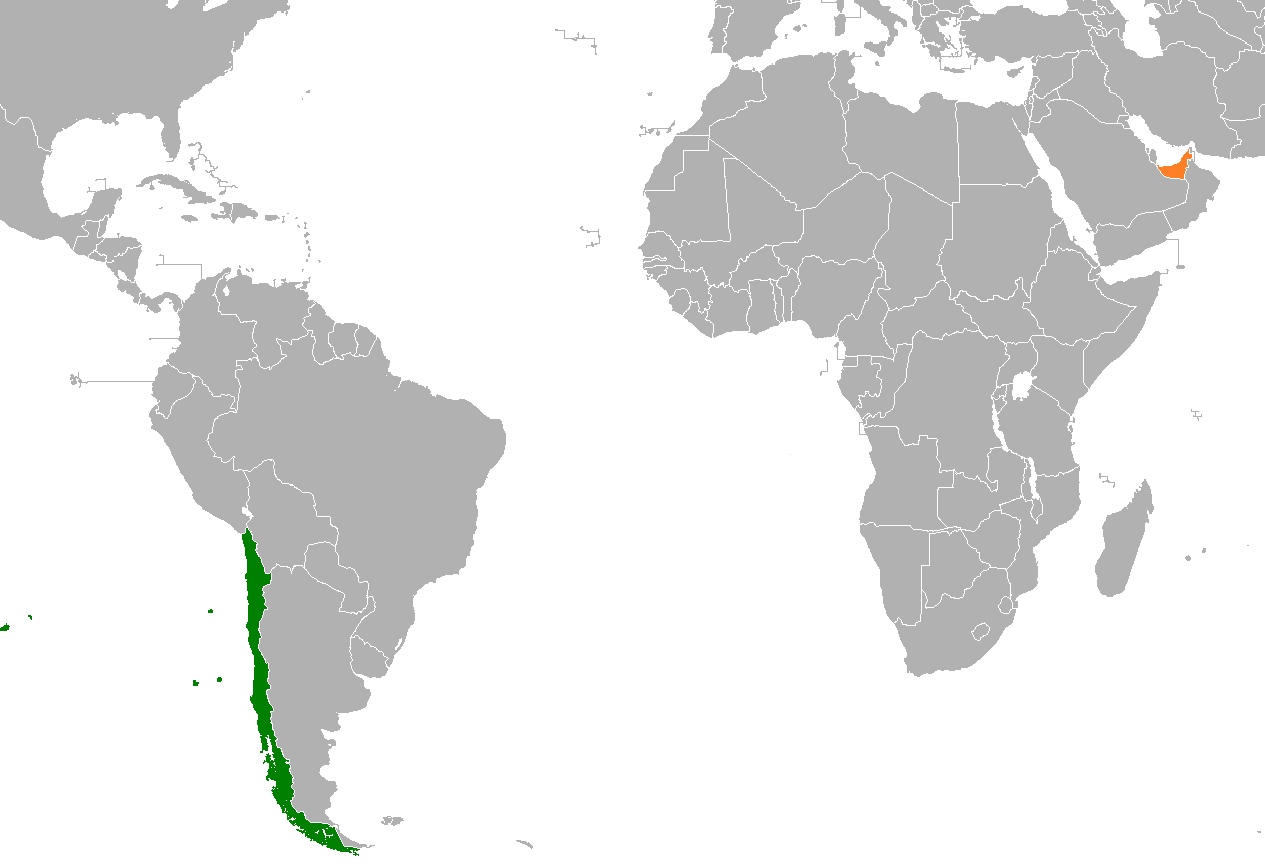

- Chile: United Arab Emirates

Diplomatic mission
- Embassy of Chile, Abu Dhabi: Embassy of the United Arab Emirates, Santiago

Chile–United Arab Emirates relations are the bilateral relations between the Republic of Chile and the United Arab Emirates (UAE). Both countries are members of the World Trade Organization, Non-Aligned Movement and the United Nations.

== History ==
Since 2009, an economic cooperation agreement has been in force between both countries, which meant placing various products with zero tariffs. In 2011, Chile opened its embassy in Abu Dhabi, and then signed an economic cooperation agreement to develop commercial exchange between Chile and the Emirate of Dubai. In November 2013, a business delegation led by the Emirati minister Sultan Al Mansoori visited Chile to participate in the Trade Economic Forum. In 2015, an agreement was signed to encourage the export of Chilean fishing and aquaculture products to the United Arab Emirates. In February 2017, due to the forest fires that devastated the central Chilean region, the United Arab Emirates donated five million dollars to Chile to address the catastrophe.

== High-level visits ==
High-level visits from the United Arab Emirates to Chile

- Minister of Economy Sultan Al Mansoori (November 9, 2013)
- Prime Minister and Vice-president Mohammed bin Rashid Al Maktoum (2014)
- Ministry of Foreign Affairs Abdullah bin Zayed Al Nahyan (2023)

== Trade ==
In 2016, trade between both countries amounted to 146 million US dollars. Chile's main exports to the UAE are pine wood, fresh apples and frozen salmon. The UAE's main exports to Chile are mobile phones, motor vehicles and polyethylene.

== Travel ==
In 2018, Emirates began operating weekly flights between Santiago and Dubai.

== See also ==
- Foreign relations of Chile
- Foreign relations of the United Arab Emirates
