= Chile–Indonesia relations =

- Chile: Indonesia

Chile and Indonesia established diplomatic relations in 1965. Both are members within the Non-Aligned Movement, WTO, Pacific Economic Cooperation Council, Asia-Pacific Economic Cooperation, and the Cairns Group. Indonesia maintains an embassy in Santiago. Chile maintains an embassy in Jakarta.

== History ==
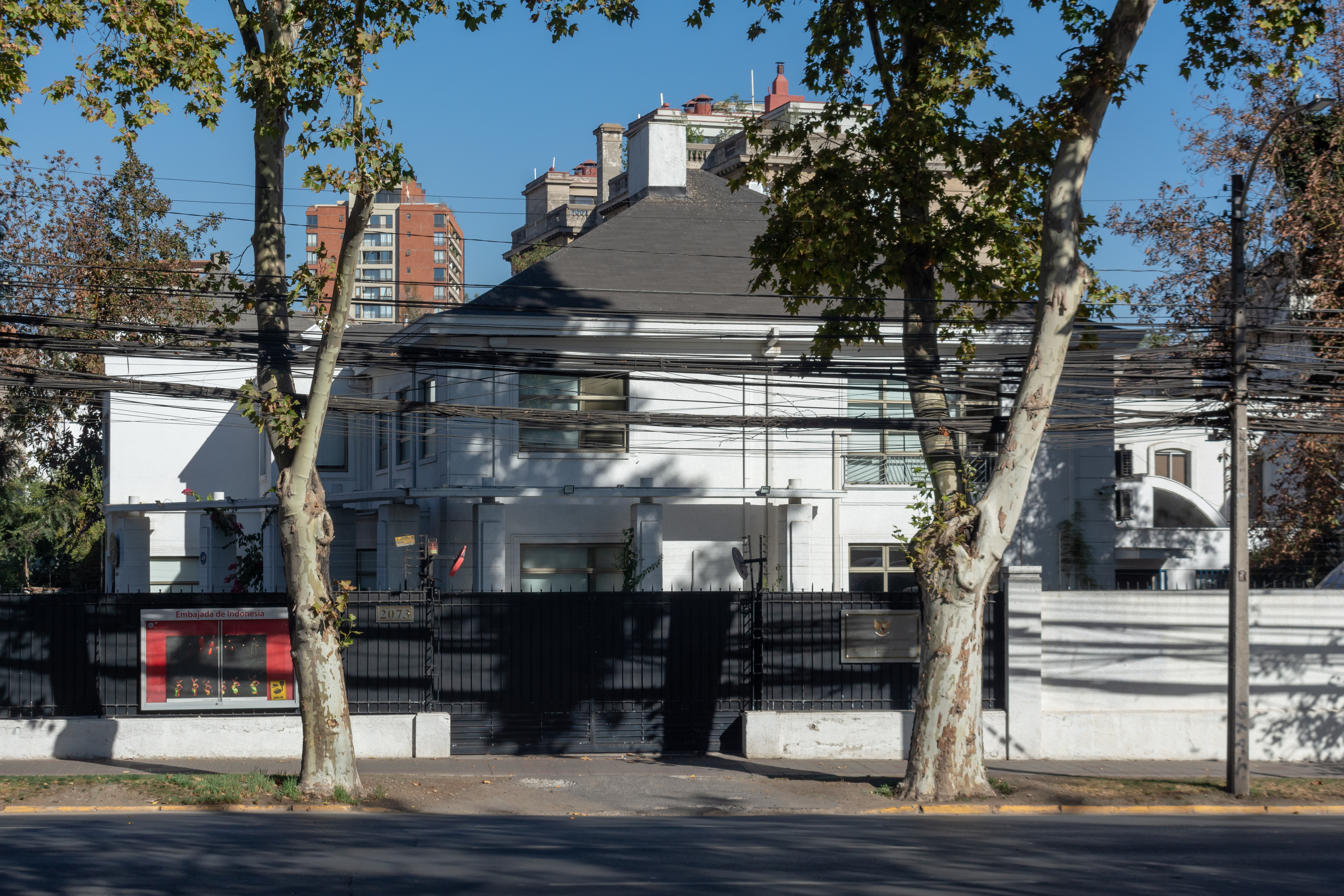
Indonesian Embassy in Providencia, Santiago Metropolitan Region

Established on 29 September 1965, relations were strengthened by the establishment of the Indonesian embassy in Santiago in March 1991. Chile–Indonesia Comprehensive Economic Partnership Agreement has eliminated tariffs on various products traded between the countries since 2019.

== Trade relations ==
Trade relations between Chile and Indonesia are framed by the free trade agreement that both parties signed in Santiago in 2017, which entered into force on August 10, 2019. Chile thus became the first Latin American country to sign a free trade agreement with Indonesia.

There are maritime routes for direct transport and trade between Chilean and Indonesian ports across the Pacific Ocean. The main products exported from Chile to Indonesia are copper by-products, grapes, chemical wood pulp, fish and fish products (salmon, fishmeal, and fish oil), while Indonesia mainly exports footwear, rubber, and motorcycles to Chile.

In 2023, trade between the two countries reached US$507.2 million, representing an average annual growth of 11.2% over the past five years. Chile's main exports were copper cathodes, radiata pine wood, and salmon, while Indonesia mainly exported automobiles, footwear, and urea.

In 2025, a phytosanitary protocol was signed between the two countries, formalizing the opening of the Indonesian market to exports of fresh Chilean lemons.

== See also ==
- Foreign relations of Chile
- Foreign relations of Indonesia
