= Armenia–Chile relations =

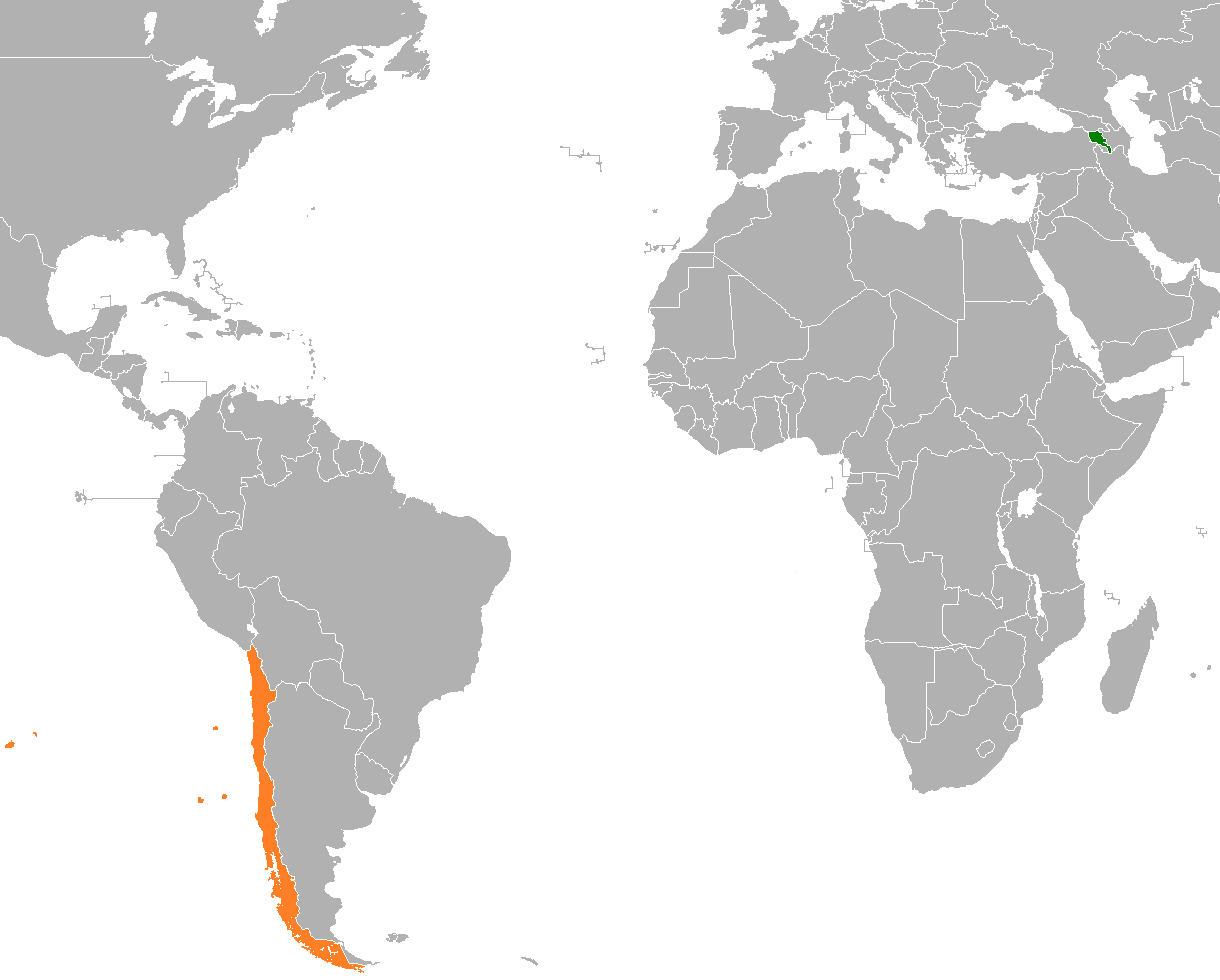

- Armenia: Chile

Armenia–Chile relations are the diplomatic and bilateral relations between Armenia and the Republic of Chile. There are over 600 Armenians and descendants residing in Chile today. Both nations are members of the United Nations. Armenia is an observer of the Pacific Alliance.

== History ==
During and soon after the Armenian genocide; many Armenians boarded ships for "America" not knowing that the ships were heading to South America. The first Armenians to arrive to Chile settled in the town of Llay-Llay, close to the port of Valparaíso. In the 1940s, the Chilean government encouraged immigration to the country, and as a result, more Armenians arrived and settled in Chile. On 26 December 1991, Armenia regained its independence after the Dissolution of the Soviet Union. On 15 April 1993, Armenia and Chile established diplomatic relations.

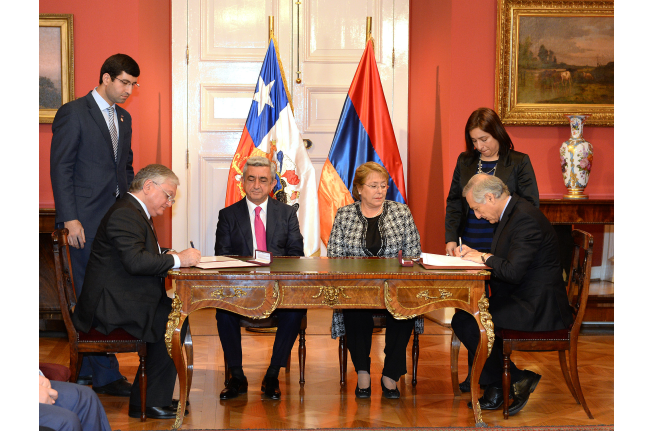
Armenian President Serzh Sargsyan and Chilean President Michelle Bachelet overseeing the signing of a bilateral agreement between both nations in July 2014.

In 2007, the Chilean government recognized the Armenian genocide. In 2023, the Chilean Parliament put forth another resolution condemning the perpetrators of the Armenian Genocide and expressed solidarity with Armenia.

In 2010, Armenia appointed an honorary consul in Santiago. In July 2014, Armenian President Serzh Sargsyan paid an official visit to Chile. During the visit, President Sargsyan met with Chilean President Michelle Bachelet and both leaders discussed a wide range of issues with regard to strengthening the Armenian-Chilean bilateral relations and making joint efforts at promoting cooperation in a number of promising areas. Both leaders signed a Memorandum of Mutual Understanding on Cooperation between both nations Ministry's of Foreign Affairs. In 2016, Chile appointed a resident honorary consul in Yerevan.

In April 2018, both nations celebrated 25 years of diplomatic relations. That same year, both nations abolished visas for holders of diplomatic and official passports between Armenia and Chile.

== Trade ==
In 2018, trade between Armenia and Chile totaled US$1.9 million. Armenia's main export to Chile is iron ore. Chile's main exports to Armenia include fish and alcoholic beverages (wine). In 2024, Bilateral trade totaled $26.61 million, favoring Armenia with a $15.8 million trade surplus driven largely by mineral exports. Armenia exported $21.2 million to Chile, with molybdenum ore making up the vast majority at $20.9 million, while Chile exported $5.41 million to Armenia, led primarily by agricultural and seafood products such as non-fillet frozen fish ($1.42M), sowing seeds ($1.08M), and nuts ($871k). Trade has continued to grow rapidly, with monthly Armenian exports reaching $13.3 million in August 2026, a 277% year-over-year increase, reflecting Armenia's strong economic reliance on molybdenum exports to the Chilean market.

== Diplomatic missions ==
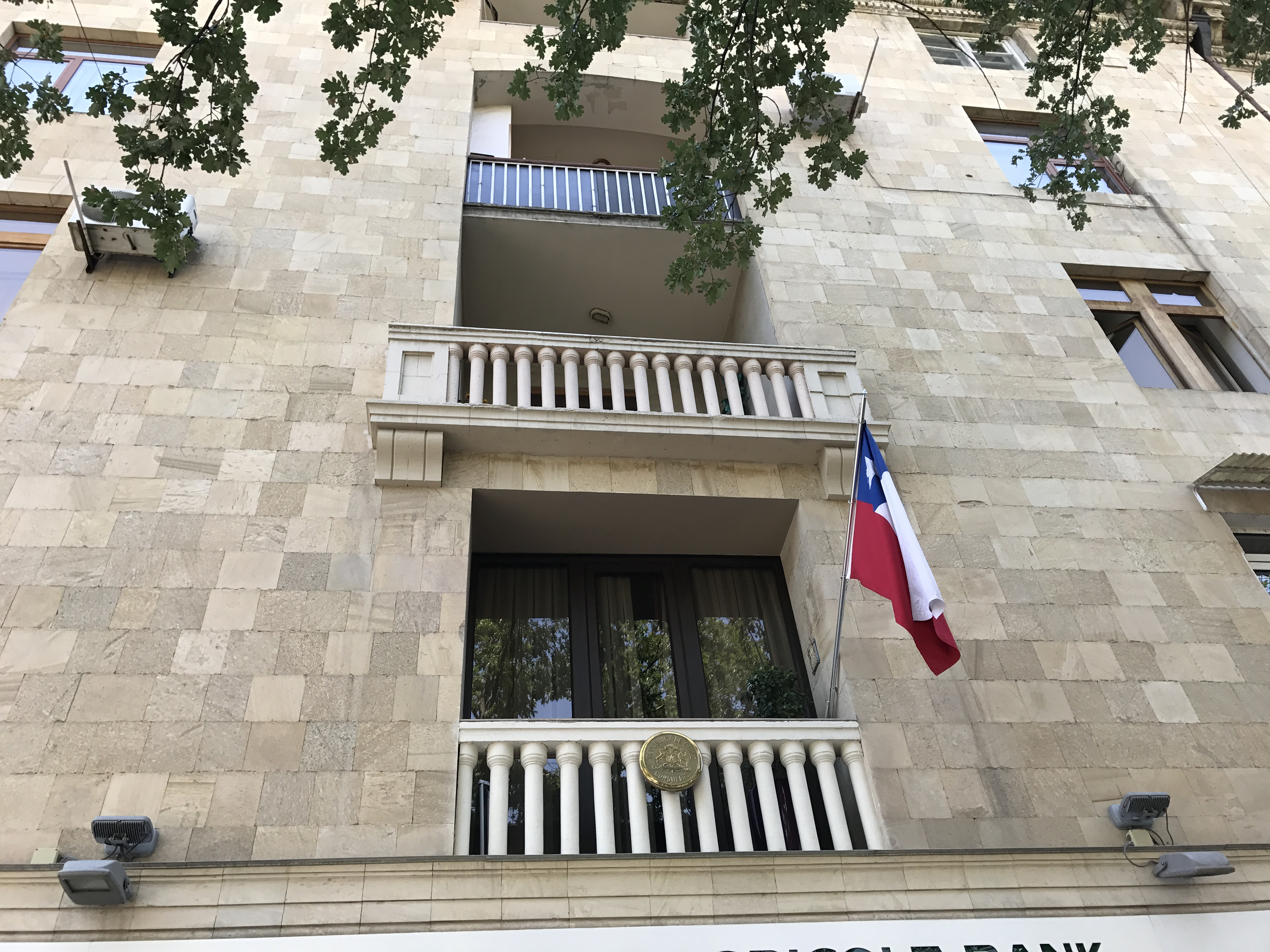
Honorary consulate of Chile in Yerevan

- Armenia is accredited to Chile from its embassy in Buenos Aires, Argentina and maintains an honorary consulate in Santiago.
- Chile is accredited to Armenia from its embassy in Moscow, Russia and maintains an honorary consulate in Yerevan.

== See also ==
- Foreign relations of Armenia
- Foreign relations of Chile
- Armenian diaspora
- Armenian genocide recognition
