= Chile–Denmark relations =

- Chile: Denmark

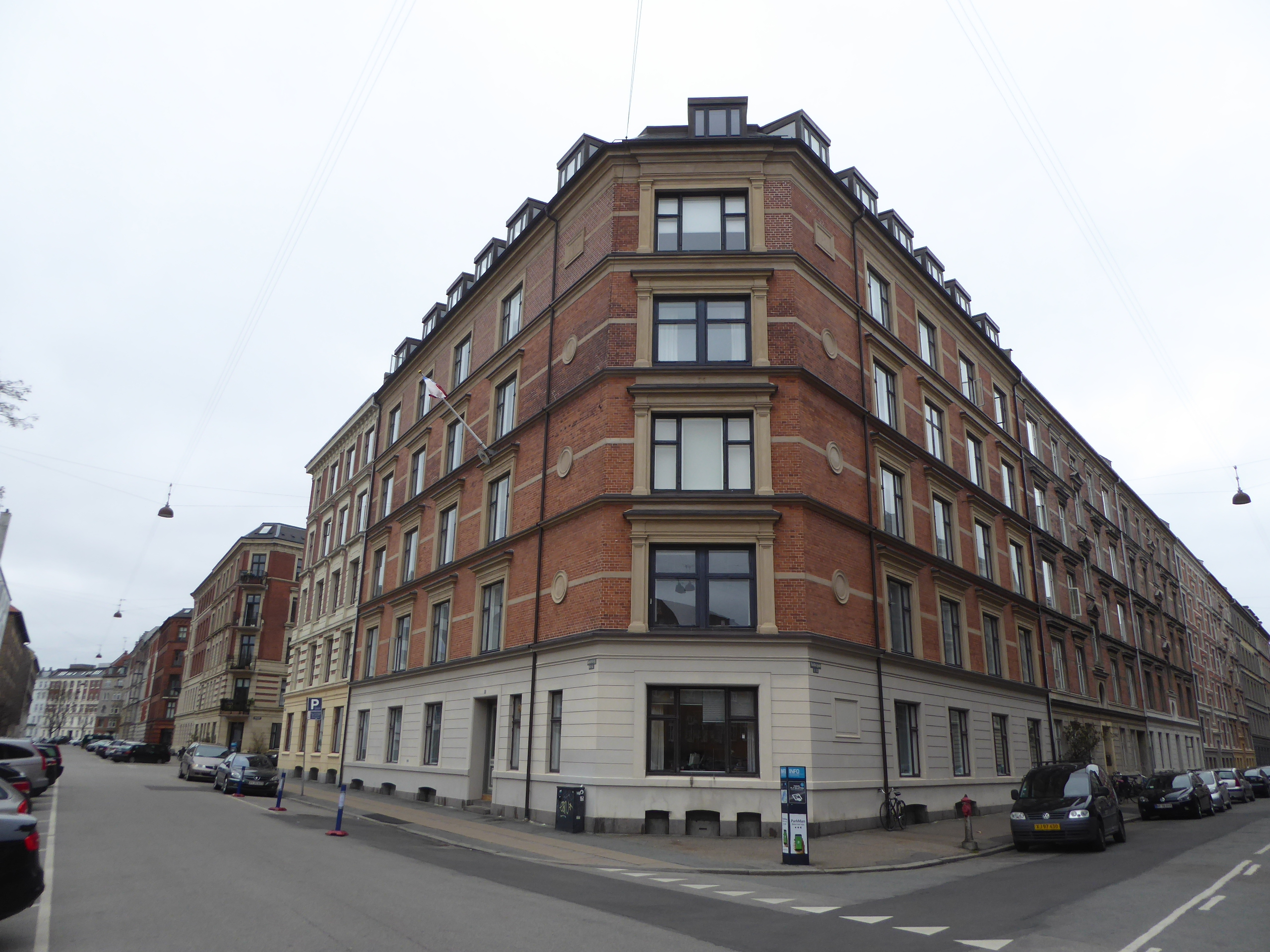
Embassy of Chile in Copenhagen

Chile–Denmark relations refers to the current and historical relations between Chile and Denmark. Chile has an embassy in Copenhagen, and Denmark has an embassy in Santiago. Relations between the two countries are described as "friendly" and excellent.

Both countries signed a commerce treaty on 4 February 1899. On 23 December 1931, a settlement treaty and a conciliation treaty were signed between Chile and Denmark. In 1965, a scientific and technical cooperation agreement were signed. Chilean-Danish Business Council were established in 2004. The council were created for the businesses representatives that worked in Chile and Denmark.

In 2009, Chile exported 840 million DKK to Denmark, while Denmark exported 645 million DKK to Chile. In 2010, Danish company Vestas invested 250 million dollars in Talinay Oriente, Chile.

Both Chilean Presidents Patricio Aylwin and Eduardo Frei Ruiz-Tagle visited Denmark, during their terms. On 26 January 2004, Chilean President Ricardo Lagos visited Denmark.

== See also ==
- Foreign relations of Chile
- Foreign relations of Denmark
- Embassy of Denmark in Santiago, Chile
