= Chile–Estonia relations =

Bilateral relations of Chile and Estonia

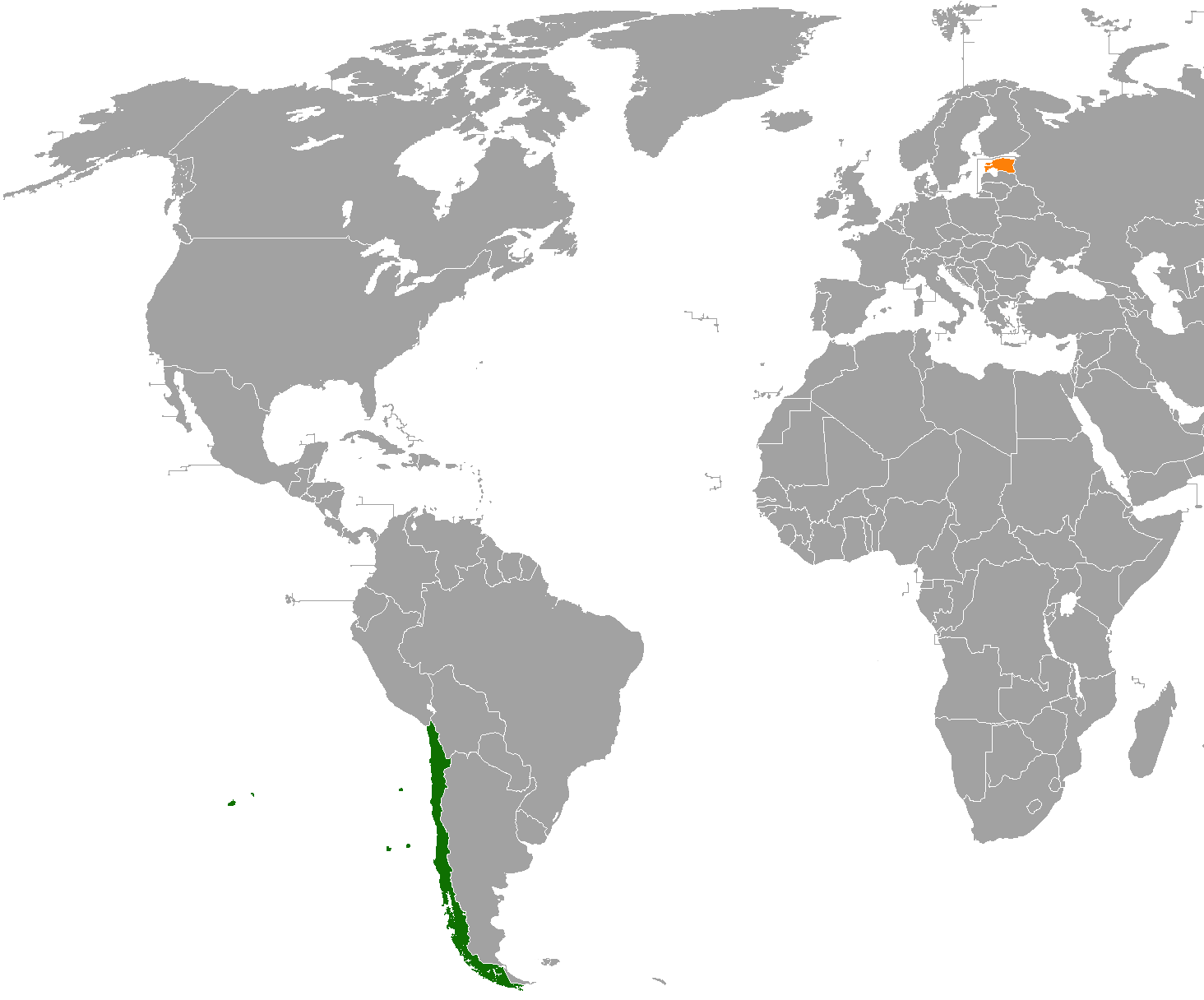
- Chile: Estonia

Chile–Estonia relations are the bilateral relations between Chile and Estonia. Chile re-recognized Estonia on August 28, 1991 and diplomatic relations between the two countries were established on September 27, 1991. Chile is represented in Estonia through its ambassador who resides in Helsinki (Finland). Estonia is represented in Chile through its ambassador in Helsinki.

== Agreements ==
- An agreement on visa-free travel between Estonia and Chile came into force on 2 December 2000.
- The two countries also have in force a Memorandum on co-operation between the Ministries of Foreign Affairs.

== Trade ==
Chile is among Estonia's most important foreign trade partners in South America. In 2007, trade between Estonia and Chile was valued at 6.3 million EUR. Estonian exports included mainly machinery, mechanical equipment, and mineral fuels; Chile exports included mainly wine, fish, crustaceans and fruit. In 2004, 83% of Chile exports to Estonia, then totaling 2.4 million EUR, consisted of wine. In 2008, Chilean wines held the highest share of Estonia's imported wine market, followed by Spanish wines. Due to its climate being unsuitable for large-scale grape production, most wine sold in Estonia is imported.

== Culture ==
In 2006, Estonia and Chile issued the joint Antarctic themed stamp series, designed by Ülle Marks and Jüri Kass, bearing images of the Emperor penguin and the minke whale. The works of Chilean writers Isabel Allende, Pablo Neruda and José Donoso have been translated into Estonian.

== See also ==
- Foreign relations of Chile
- Foreign relations of Estonia
