= Chile–Portugal relations =

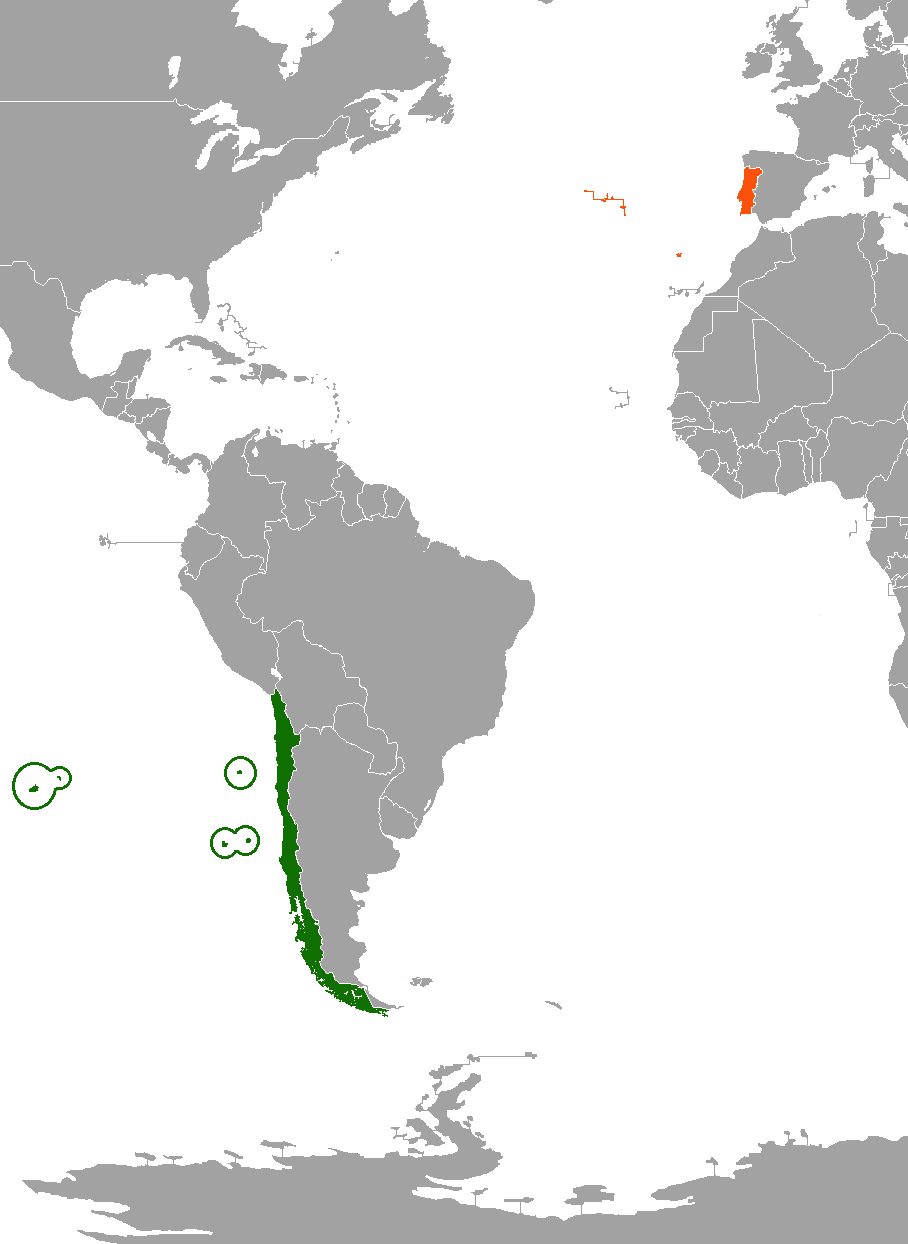
- Chile: Portugal

Chile–Portugal relations refers to the diplomatic relations between the Republic of Chile and the Portuguese Republic. Both nations are members of the OECD, Organization of Ibero-American States and the United Nations.

== History ==
The first European to sight Chilean territory was Portuguese explorer Ferdinand Magellan (in the service of Spain) in November 1520. On 1 August 1821 Portugal became the first country to recognize Chile's independence from Spain. In 1879 both nations signed a Treaty of Friendship, Commerce and Navigation.

In 1865, Chile opened a consulate in Lisbon. In 1912, Portugal accredited an ambassador to Chile based in Buenos Aires, Argentina. In 1918, Chile appointed an ambassador to Portugal based in Madrid, Spain. In 1934, Portugal opened a resident diplomatic legation in Santiago.

After the 1973 Chilean coup d'état, Portugal closed its embassy in Santiago, placing an honorary consul in his place in protest for the actions of the new Chilean government. As a reciprocal measure, the Chilean government under Augusto Pinochet closed its embassy in Lisbon and established an honorary consulate. In 1988, Portugal announced the re-opening of an embassy in Santiago and Chile followed-suite with a re-opening of an embassy in Lisbon.

In July 1992, Chilean President Patricio Aylwin paid an official visit to Portugal, becoming the first Chilean head-of-government to do so. In July 1993, Portuguese President Mario Soares paid an official visit to Chile, becoming the first Portuguese head-of-state to do so.

Both nations consider themselves to be "like minded countries" and work closely together in various international organizations to promote topics of mutual interests. With regard to outstanding honorific names, the Praça do Chile is a square located in the Arroios district in Lisbon; while in Santiago, Portugal Avenue is an important thoroughfare in the city center, which begins at the intersection with the Alameda Avenue.

== High-level visits ==
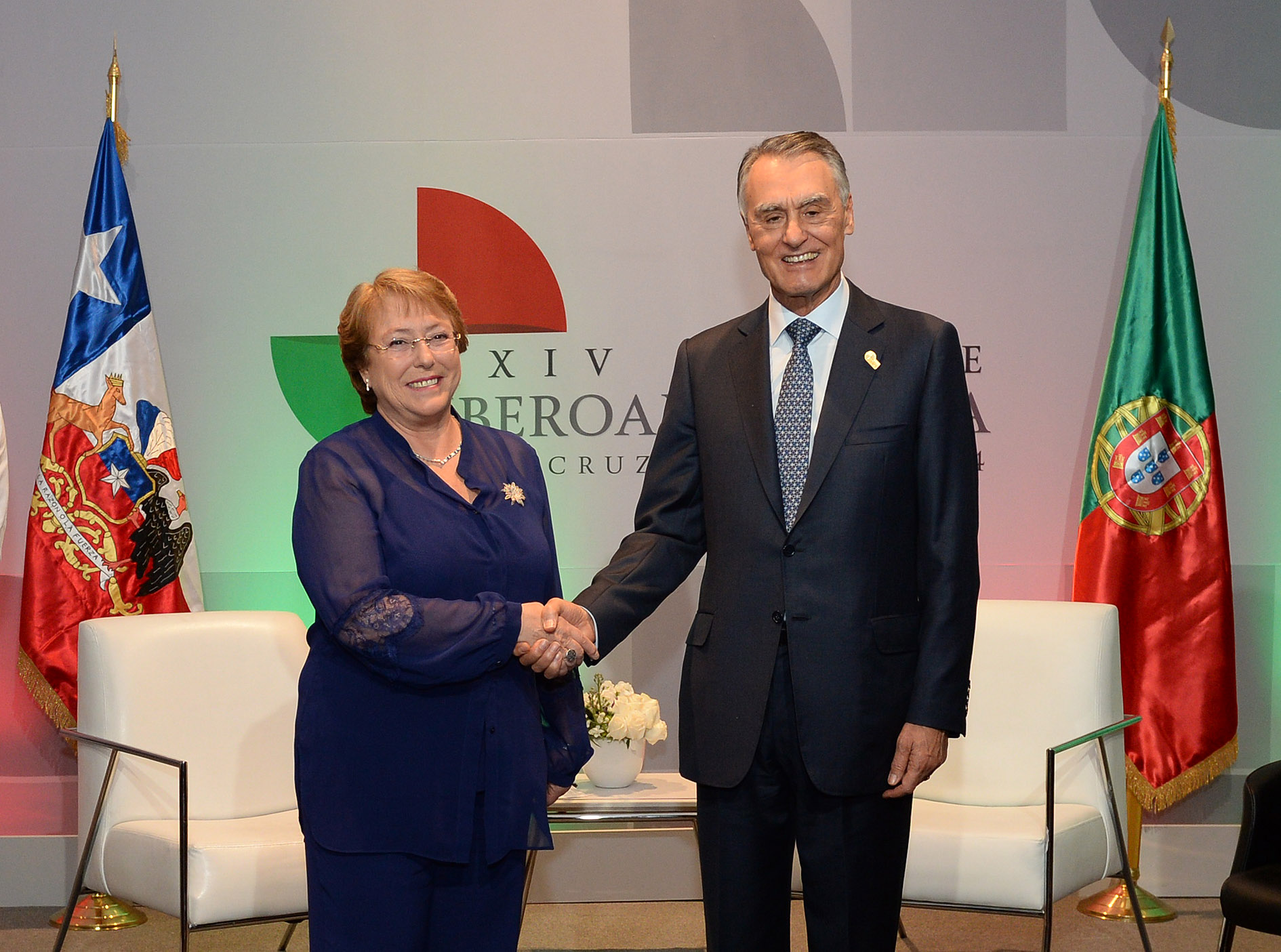
Chilean President Michelle Bachelet and Portuguese Aníbal Cavaco Silva during the Ibero-American Summit in Veracruz City, Mexico; 2014.

High-level visits from Chile to Portugal

- President Patricio Aylwin (1992)
- President Eduardo Frei Ruiz-Tagle (1998)
- President Ricardo Lagos (2001)
- Foreign Minister Alejandro Foxley (2007)
- President Michelle Bachelet (2009)

High-level visits from Portugal to Chile

- President Mario Soares (1993)
- President Jorge Sampaio (1996, 2006)
- Prime Minister António Guterres (1996)
- President Aníbal Cavaco Silva (2007)
- Prime Minister José Sócrates (2007)
- Foreign Minister Luís Amado (2010)

== Bilateral agreements ==
Both nations have signed several bilateral agreements such as a Treaty of Friendship, Commerce and Navigation (1879); Agreement on the Exchange of Diplomatic Bags (1949); Trade Agreement (1958); Agreement on Visa Exemption for Ordinary Passport Holders (1970); Agreement on Reciprocal Exemption of Taxes on Maritime Freight (1982); Agreement that Authorizes the Remunerated Work of Relatives of the Diplomatic, Consular, Administrative and Technical Personnel from their Respective Embassies (1995); Agreement on the Promotion and Reciprocal Protection of Investments (1995); Social Security Agreement (1999); Agreement of Cooperation in Education, Science, Higher Education, Culture, Youth, Sports and Social Communication (2007); Agreement for the Avoidance of Double Taxation (2005); Memorandum of Understanding on Cooperation in Energy Matters (2009); and a Memorandum of Understanding for the establishment of a Mechanism for Political Consultations on Issues of Mutual Interests (2009).

== Resident diplomatic missions ==
- Chile has an embassy in Lisbon.
- Portugal has an embassy in Santiago.
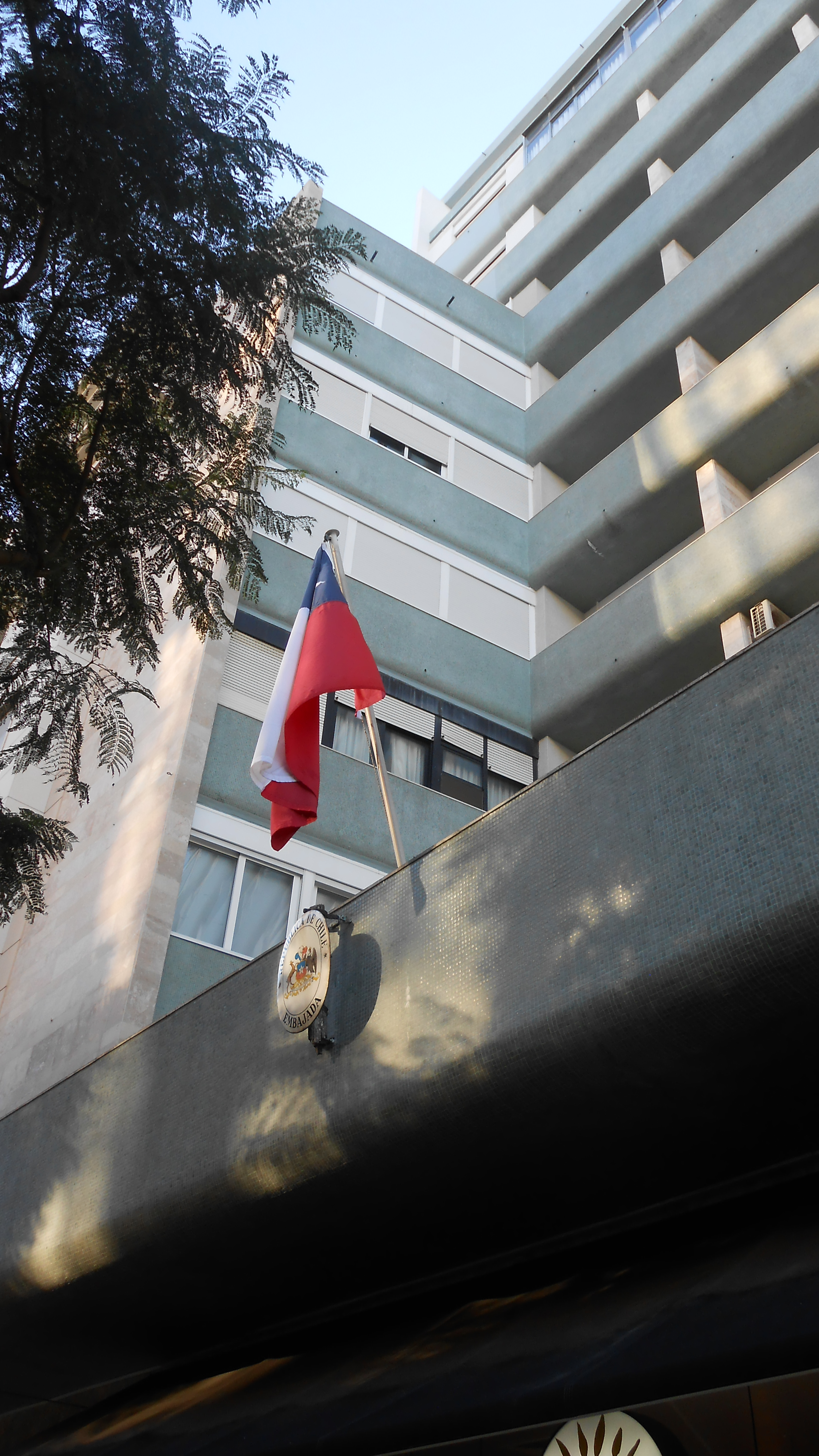
Embassy of Chile in Lisbon

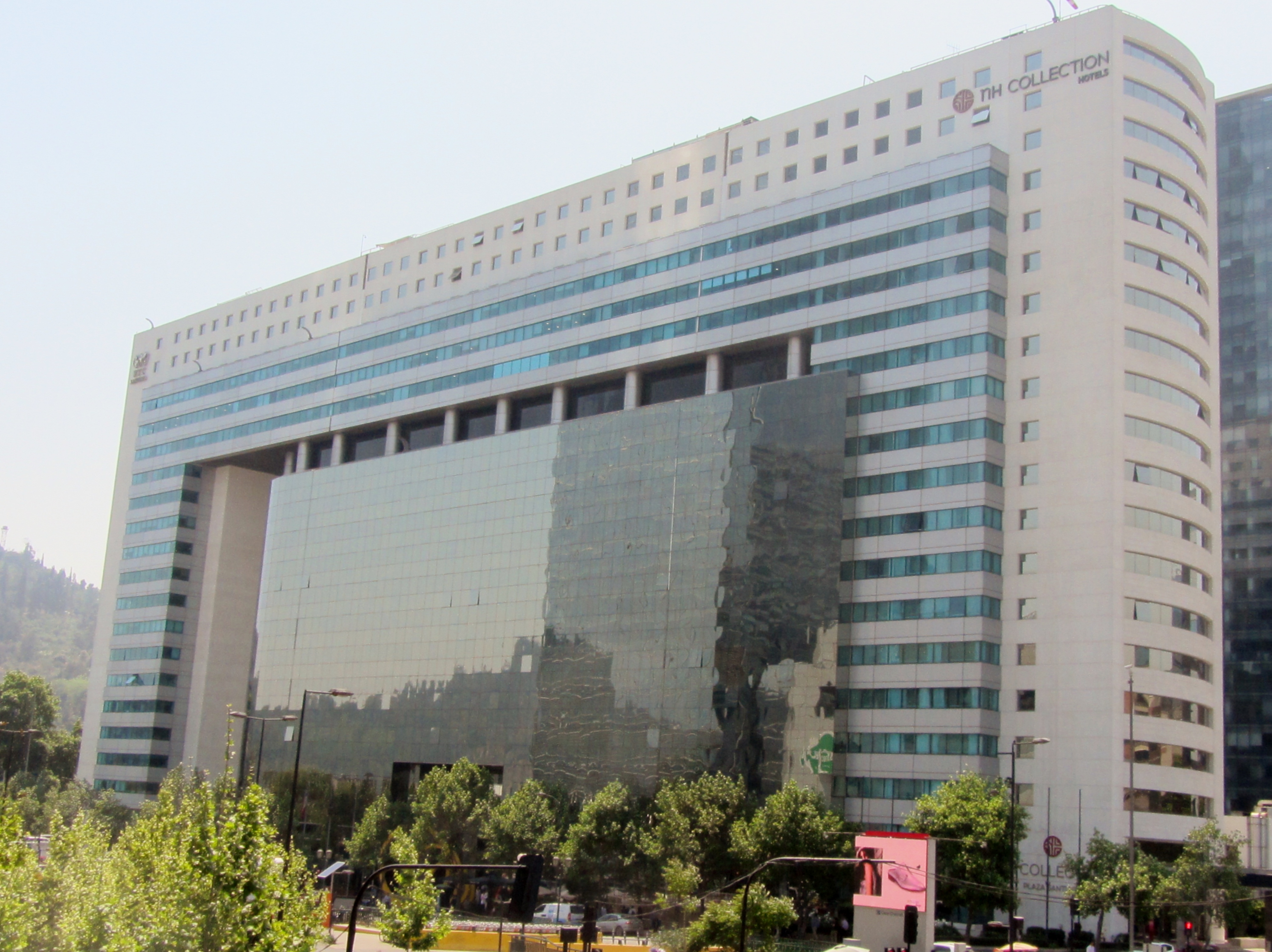
Building hosting the Embassy of Portugal in Santiago

== See also ==
- Foreign relations of Chile
- Foreign relations of Portugal
