= List of diplomatic missions in Chile =

This is a list of diplomatic missions in Chile. There are currently 70 embassies in Santiago, and many countries maintain consulates in other Chilean cities (not including honorary consulates).

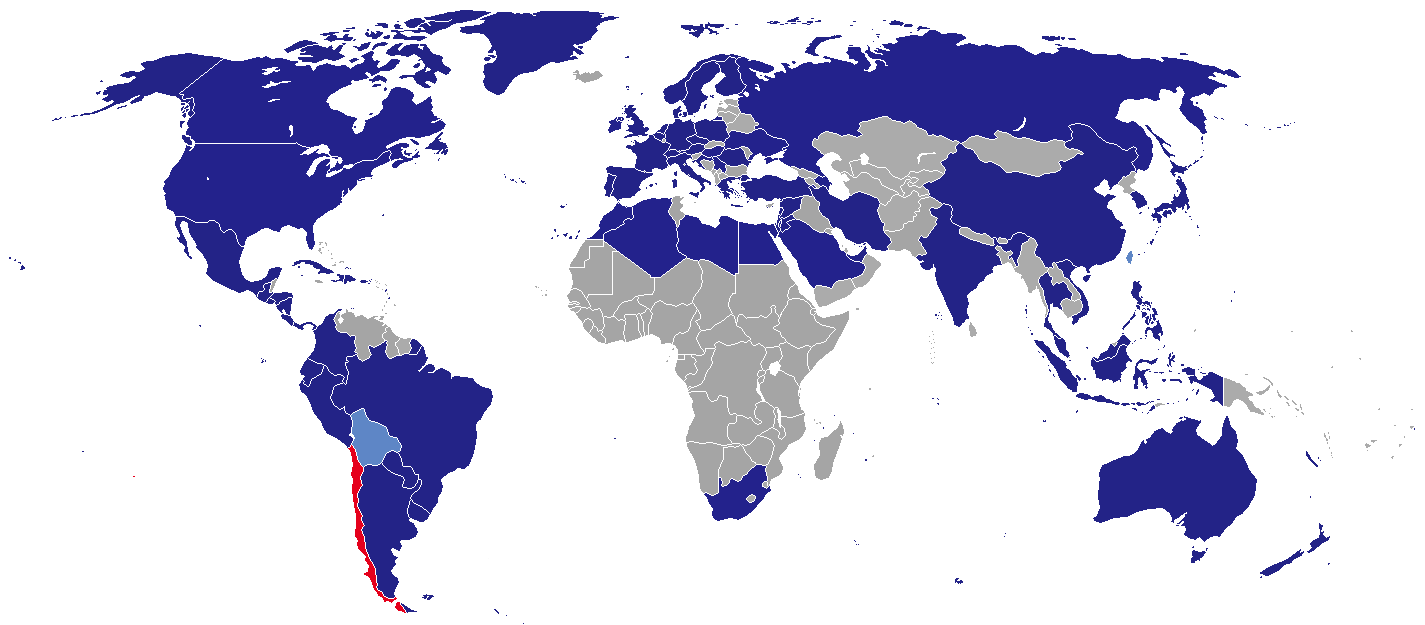
Diplomatic missions in Chile

== Diplomatic missions in Santiago ==
Country	Mission type	Photo
Algeria	Embassy	
Argentina	Embassy	
Australia	Embassy	
Austria	Embassy	
Azerbaijan	Embassy office	
Belgium	Embassy	
Bolivia	Consulate-General	
Brazil	Embassy	
Canada	Embassy	
China	Embassy	
Colombia	Embassy	
Costa Rica	Embassy	
Croatia	Embassy	
Cuba	Embassy	
Czech Republic	Embassy	
Denmark	Embassy	
Dominican Republic	Embassy	
Ecuador	Embassy	
Egypt	Embassy	
El Salvador	Embassy	
European Union	Delegation	
Finland	Embassy	
France	Embassy	
Germany	Embassy	
Greece	Embassy	
Guatemala	Embassy	
Haiti	Embassy	
Holy See	Apostolic Nunciature	
Honduras	Embassy	
Hungary	Embassy	
India	Embassy	
Indonesia	Embassy	
Iran	Embassy	
Ireland	Embassy	
Israel	Embassy	
Italy	Embassy	
Japan	Embassy	
Jordan	Embassy	
Lebanon	Embassy	
Libya	Embassy	
Malaysia	Embassy	
Mexico	Embassy	
Morocco	Embassy	
Netherlands	Embassy	
New Zealand	Embassy	
Nicaragua	Embassy	
Norway	Embassy	
Palestine	Embassy	
Panama	Embassy	
Paraguay	Embassy	
Peru	Embassy	
Philippines	Embassy	
Poland	Embassy	
Portugal	Embassy	
Romania	Embassy	
Russia	Embassy	
Saudi Arabia	Embassy	
Serbia	Embassy	
South Africa	Embassy	
South Korea	Embassy	
Sovereign Military Order of Malta	Embassy	
Spain	Embassy	
Sweden	Embassy	
Switzerland	Embassy	
Syria	Embassy	
Republic of China (Taiwan)	Representative Office	
Thailand	Embassy	
Turkey	Embassy	
Ukraine	Embassy	
United Arab Emirates	Embassy	
United Kingdom	Embassy	
United States	Embassy	
Uruguay	Embassy	
Vietnam	Embassy	

== Non-resident embassies accredited to Chile ==
=== Resident in Buenos Aires, Argentina ===
1. Angola
2. Armenia
3. Azerbaijan
4. Belarus
5. Bulgaria
6. Congo-Kinshasa
7. Cyprus
8. Georgia
9. Kuwait
10. Montenegro
11. Nigeria
12. Pakistan
13. Qatar
14. Slovakia
15. Slovenia
16. Tunisia

=== Resident in Brasília, Brazil ===
1. Bangladesh
2. Barbados
3. Benin
4. Botswana
5. Burkina Faso
6. Cambodia
7. Equatorial Guinea
8. Ethiopia
9. Gabon
10. Ghana
11. Guinea
12. Guyana
13. Ivory Coast
14. Kazakhstan
15. Kenya
16. Luxembourg
17. Malawi
18. Mali
19. Malta
20. Mauritania
21. Mozambique
22. Myanmar
23. Namibia
24. Nepal
25. Oman
26. Senegal
27. Sri Lanka
28. Sudan
29. Suriname
30. Tanzania
31. Trinidad and Tobago
32. Zambia

=== Resident in Washington, D.C., United States ===
1. Eswatini
2. Lesotho
3. Madagascar
4. Marshall Islands
5. Sierra Leone
6. Uganda

=== Resident elsewhere ===
1. Afghanistan (Ottawa)
2. Antigua and Barbuda (Kingston)
3. Bahamas (Nassau)
4. Brunei (Ottawa)
5. Estonia (Helsinki)
6. Grenada (Caracas)
7. Iceland (Madrid)
8. Mongolia (Havana)
9. Rwanda (New York City)
10. Saint Vincent and the Grenadines (Caracas)
11. Singapore (Singapore)
12. Tonga (New York City)

== Consular missions ==
=== Antofagasta, Antofagasta Region ===
- Argentina (Consulate)
- Bolivia (Consulate)
- Colombia (Consulate-General)
- Peru (Consulate-General)

=== Arica, Arica y Parinacota Region ===
- Bolivia (Consulate-General)
- Peru (Consulate-General)

=== Calama, Antofagasta Region ===
- Bolivia (Consulate)

=== Concepción, Biobío Region ===
- Argentina (Consulate)

=== Iquique, Tarapacá Region ===
- Bolivia (Consulate)
- Paraguay (Consulate-General)
- Peru (Consulate-General)

=== Punta Arenas, Magallanes Region ===
- Argentina (Consulate General)

=== Puerto Montt, Los Lagos Region ===
- Argentina (Consulate)

=== Valparaíso, Valparaíso Region ===
- Argentina (Consulate General)
- Panama (Consulate General)

== Closed missions ==
Host city	Sending country	Mission	Year closed	Ref.
Santiago	Bulgaria	Embassy	2011	
Santiago	East Germany	Embassy	1973 (Note: Existed as a commercial mission in between 1956 and 1971, when it opened as an embassy after formal diplomatic relations were established.)	
Santiago	Iraq	Embassy	Unknown	
Santiago	Kuwait	Embassy	2024	
Santiago	Nigeria	Embassy	Unknown	
Santiago	North Korea	Embassy	1973	
Santiago	Pakistan	Embassy	2014	
Santiago	Slovakia	Embassy	2004	
Santiago	Venezuela	Embassy	2024	
Santiago	Zambia	Embassy	1973	
Arica	Argentina	Consulate	1990	
Iquique	China	Consulate-General	2024	
Valparaíso	Peru	Consulate-General (Note: To be reopened.)	2020	

== See also ==
- Foreign relations of Chile
- Visa requirements for Chilean citizens
