= Chile–Vietnam relations =

Chilean–Vietnamese relations
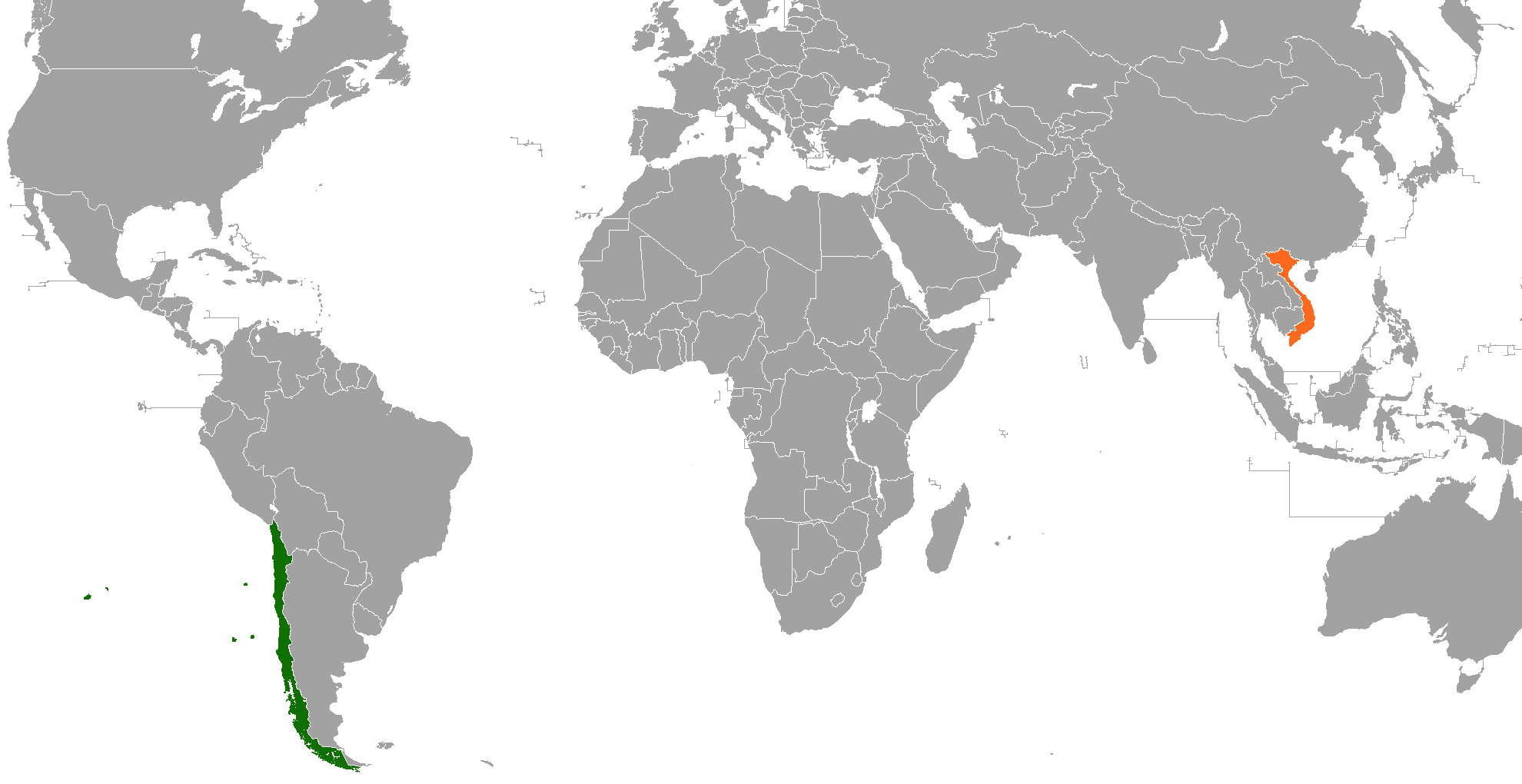
- Chile: Vietnam

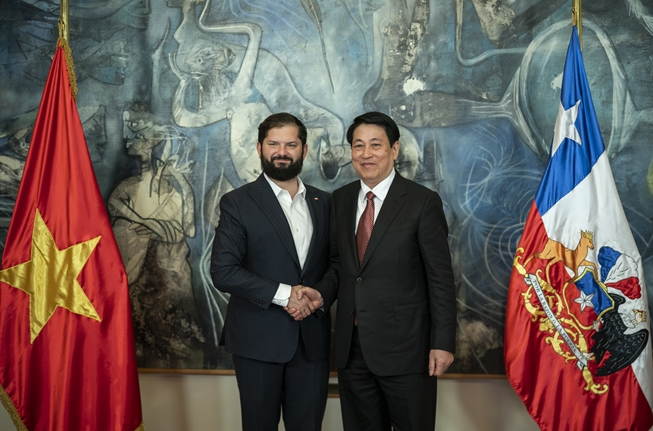
Chilean President Gabriel Boric and Vietnamese President Lương Cường in Santiago; November 2024.

Chile–Vietnam relations are the current and historical relations between Chile and Vietnam. Both countries are members of Asia-Pacific Economic Cooperation and are main parties signing the Trans-Pacific Partnership.

== History ==
Chile was the second country in Latin America and the first in South America to acknowledge the State of Vietnam in 1950.

Chile and Vietnam first established relations in 1971, when North Vietnam was engaged in the Vietnam War. However, after Augusto Pinochet staged a coup d'état a year later and following North Vietnam's victory in 1975 the relationship became strained. Pinochet, an anti-communist, was hostile to the newly established communist government of Vietnam and there was no official relationship during the 1980s between the right-wing anti-communist Chilean junta and Communist Vietnam.

In November 2026, Chilean President José Antonio Kast paid an official visit to Hanoi, to expand trade and agricultural exports within ASEAN, participating in the "Choose Chile" business forum, laying a wreath at the Ho Chi Minh Mausoleum, and meeting with Vietnamese President Tô Lâm and National Assembly Chairman Trần Thanh Mẫn to sign bilateral agreements.

== Economic relations ==
Throughout the late 1980s both countries witnessed big changes. Vietnam began their economic reform in 1986 while Chile transferred from junta to democracy in 1990. The relationship thawed. Chile has become one of Latin America's largest economic investors to Vietnam. As of 2017, Vietnam is Chile's second largest trading partner in the ASEAN.

The two countries have been deepening their trade and economic relations which are now much deeper than the usual trade relations between two countries, as praised by Ambassador of Chile to Vietnam Claudio de Negri.

Both nations signed a free-trade agreement in 2014, which was re-affirmed by President Michelle Bachelet in her visit to Vietnam at 2017.

Following a period of steady growth through 2021, bilateral trade experienced a contraction between 2022 and 2024. During this timeframe, Chilean exports declined from US$416.3 million in 2022 to US$291.6 million in 2024, while imports dropped from US$1,318.9 million to US$1,165.1 million

In 2024, bilateral trade between Vietnam and Chile resulted in a significant trade surplus of $898 million in favor of Vietnam, with Vietnamese exports reaching $1.19 billion compared to $290 million in Chilean exports. Vietnam's primary exports to Chile consisted largely of manufactured goods and electronics, led by telephones ($414 million), textile footwear ($87.4 million), leather footwear ($87.3 million), and computers ($83.7 million), whereas Chile's exports to Vietnam were dominated by raw materials and agricultural products, including non-fillet frozen fish ($82.7 million), sawn wood ($55.2 million), and scrap iron ($33.8 million). Bilateral commerce continued to expand into 2026, with Vietnamese exports growing at a five-year annualized rate of 9.14% and reaching $147 million in August 2026 alone, a 24.8% year-on-year increase driven primarily by telephones and video displays, while Chilean exports to Vietnam rose 28.3% year-on-year to $26.2 million during the same month.

== Resident diplomatic missions ==
- Chile has an embassy in Hanoi.
- Vietnam has an embassy in Santiago.
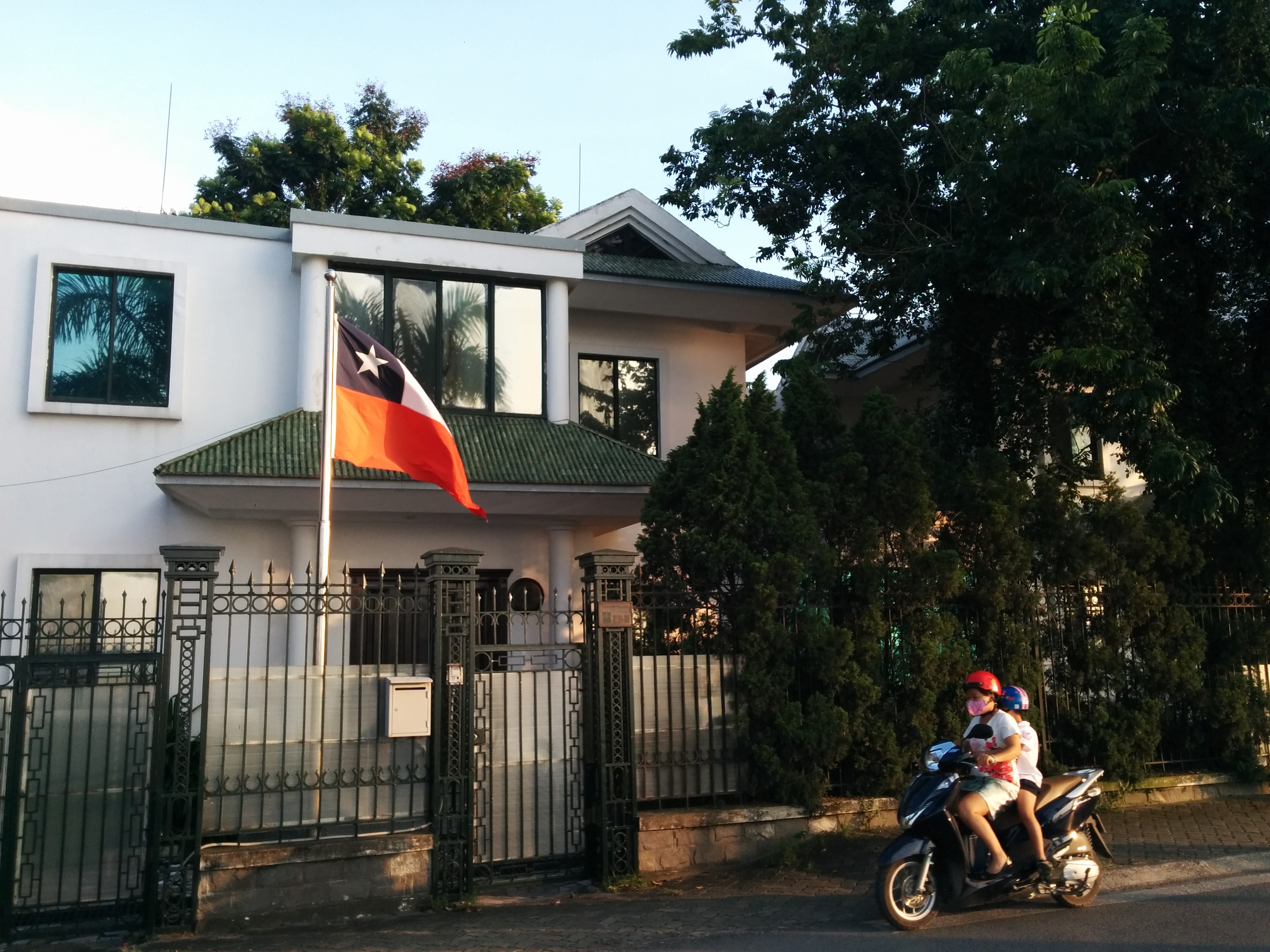
Embassy of Chile in Hanoi

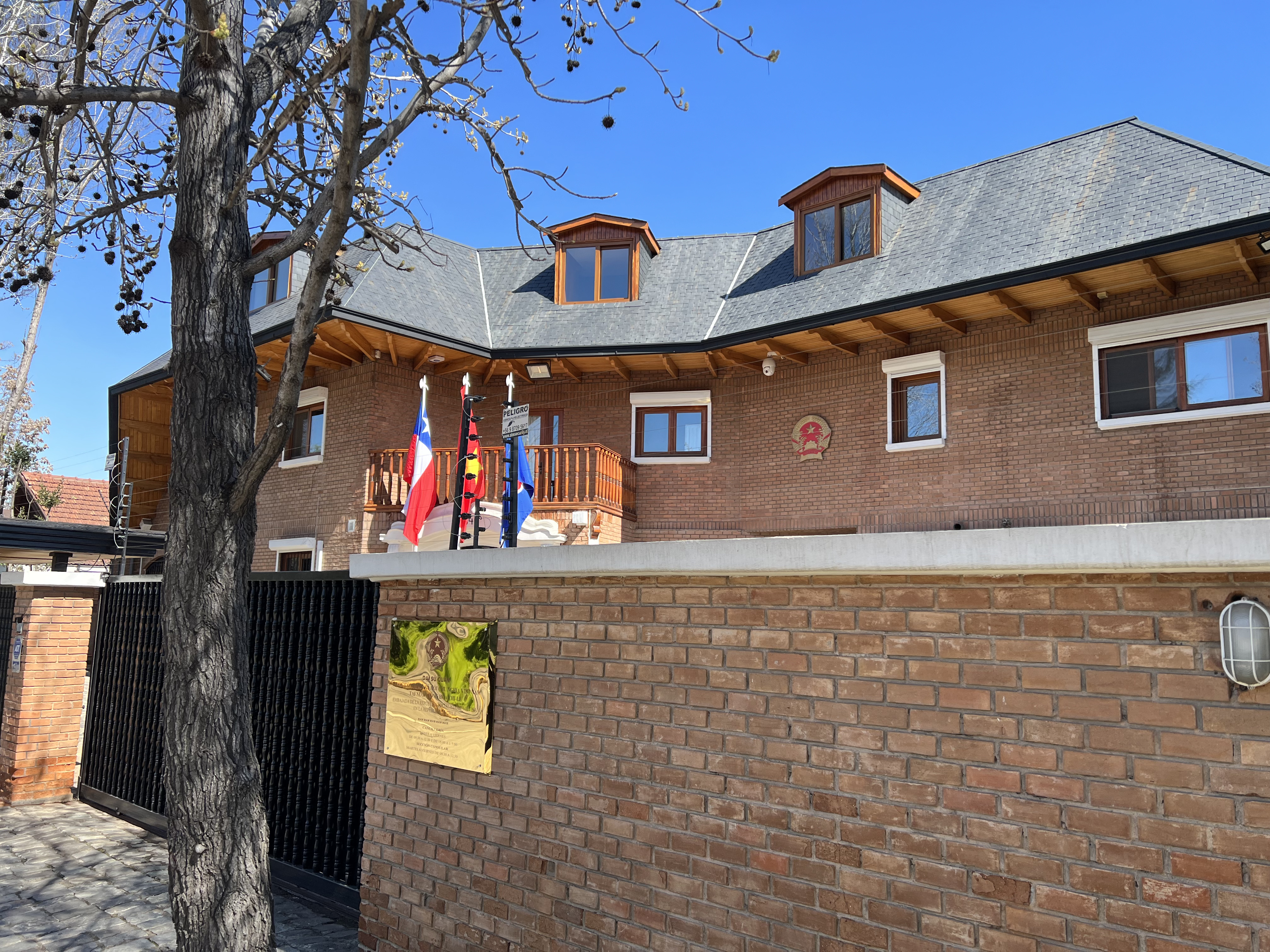
Embassy of Vietnam in Santiago

== See also ==
- Foreign relations of Chile
- Foreign relations of Vietnam
