= Chile–Ukraine relations =

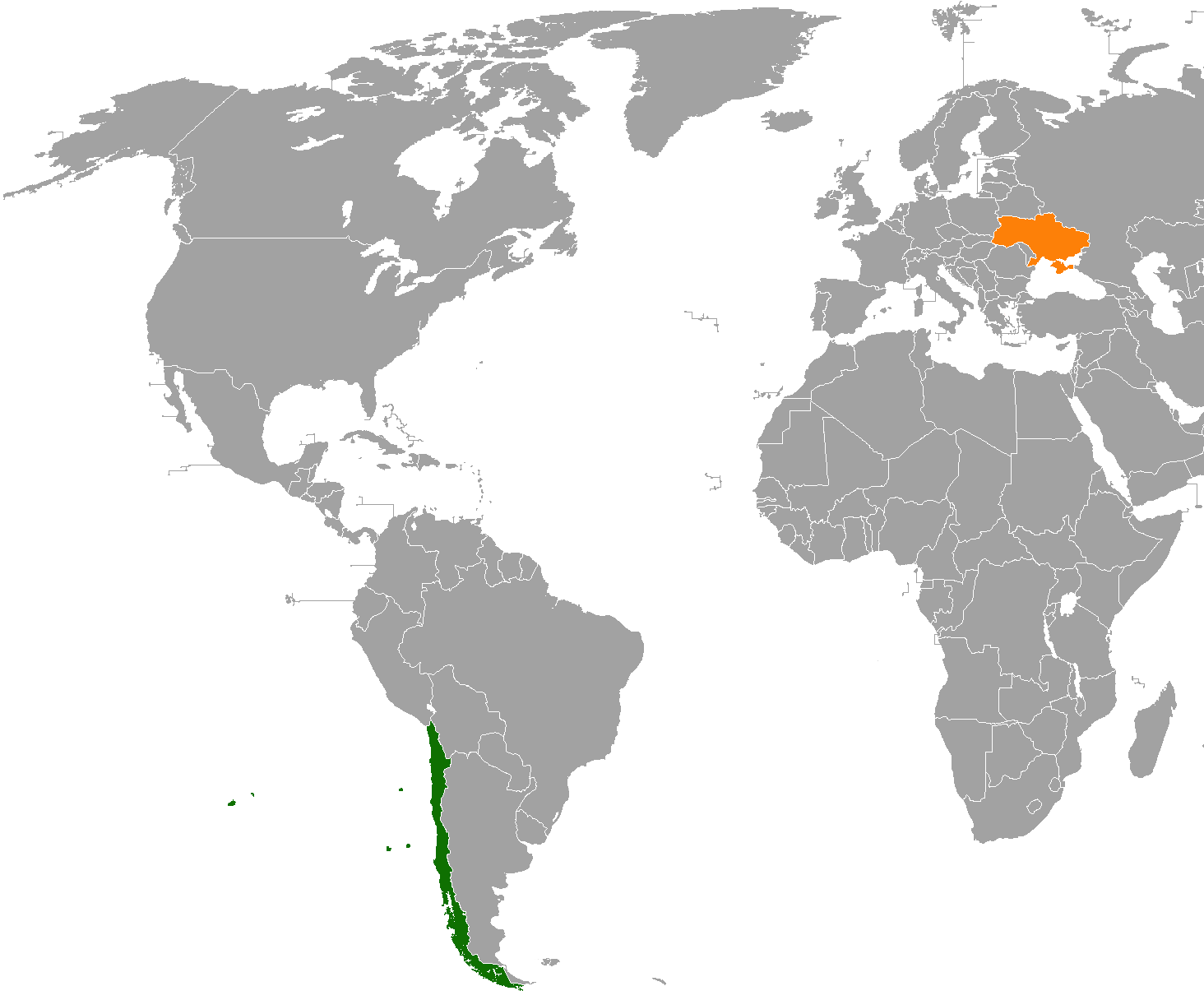
- Chile: Ukraine

Chile–Ukraine relations are the diplomatic relations between the Republic of Chile and Ukraine.

== History ==
On 28 January 1992, Chile and Ukraine established diplomatic relations.

President Gabriel Boric condemned the 2022 Russian invasion of Ukraine, stating in a tweet: "Russia has chosen war as a means of resolving conflicts. From Chile, we condemn the invasion of Ukraine, the violation of its sovereignty, and the illegitimate use of force. We stand in solidarity with the victims and will strive for peace through our humble efforts." He strongly condemned the 2022 Russian invasion of Ukraine as an "unacceptable war of aggression." During his presidency, Chile supported United Nations resolutions demanding the immediate withdrawal of Russian troops from Ukraine and offered assistance to the Ukrainian government in clearing landmines left by Russian forces. Boric declined requests to supply Ukraine with weapons. The United States offered to replace any equipment donated by the Chilean Armed Forces to support the Ukrainian armed forces, an offer which Boric rejected.

On 21 April 2026, President Volodymyr Zelenskyy held a video call with President José Antonio Kast, during which Chile reaffirmed its support for Ukraine's sovereignty and rejected the Russian occupation of its territories. Zelenskyy also invited Kast to visit the country and observe developments in agriculture, mining, and technology. In addition, Zelenskyy offered Kast a security arrangement similar to those it has with some Arab countries of the Persian Gulf, and thanked him for incorporating Chile into the International Coalition for the Return of Ukrainian Children, which will hold a summit in May in which Chile will participate.

== Diplomatic missions ==
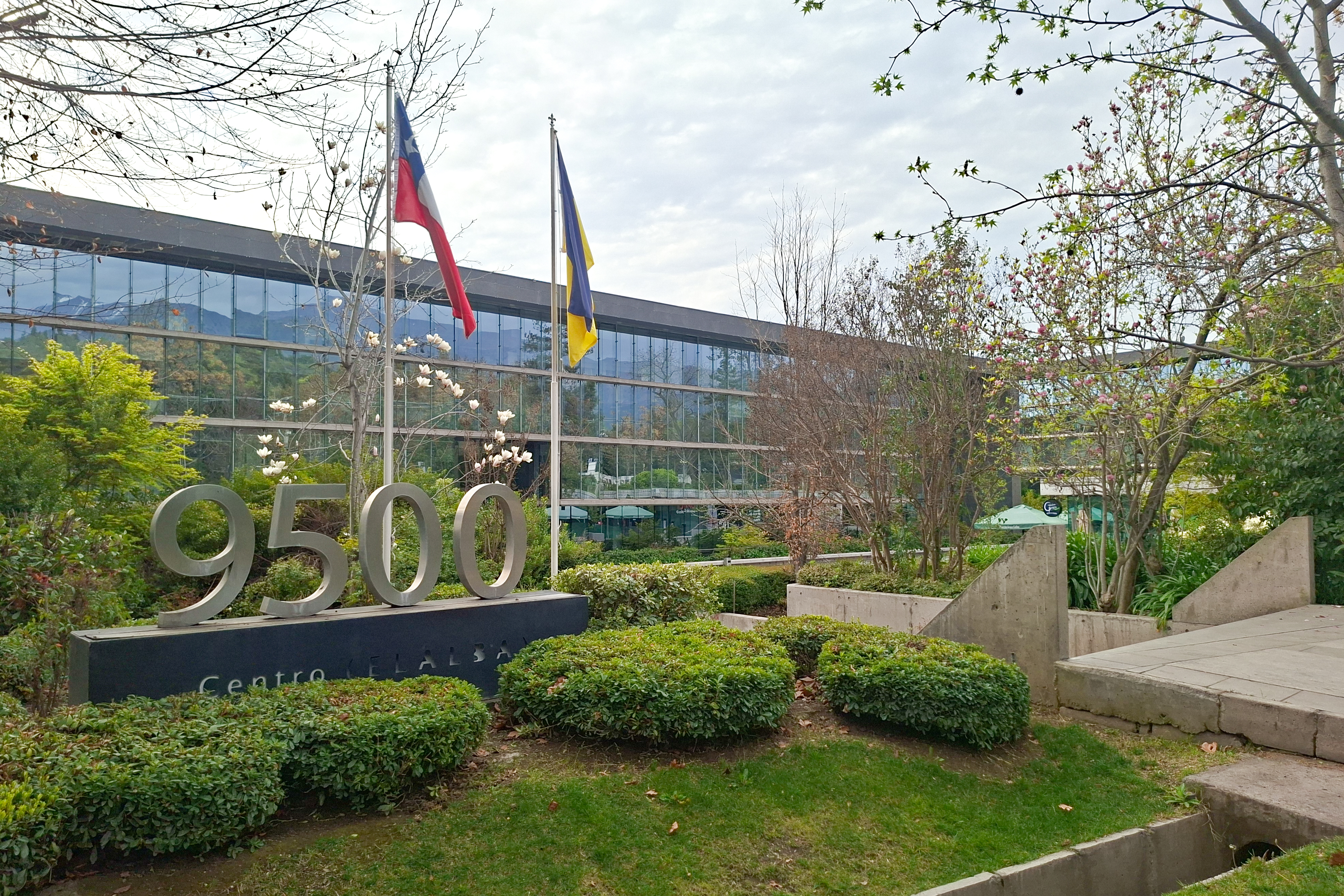
Building hosting the Embassy of Ukraine in Santiago

- Chile is accredited to Ukraine from its embassy in Warsaw, Poland, and has an honorary consul in Kyiv.
- Ukraine has an embassy in Santiago.

== See also ==
- Foreign relations of Chile
- Foreign relations of Ukraine
