= Chile–Norway relations =

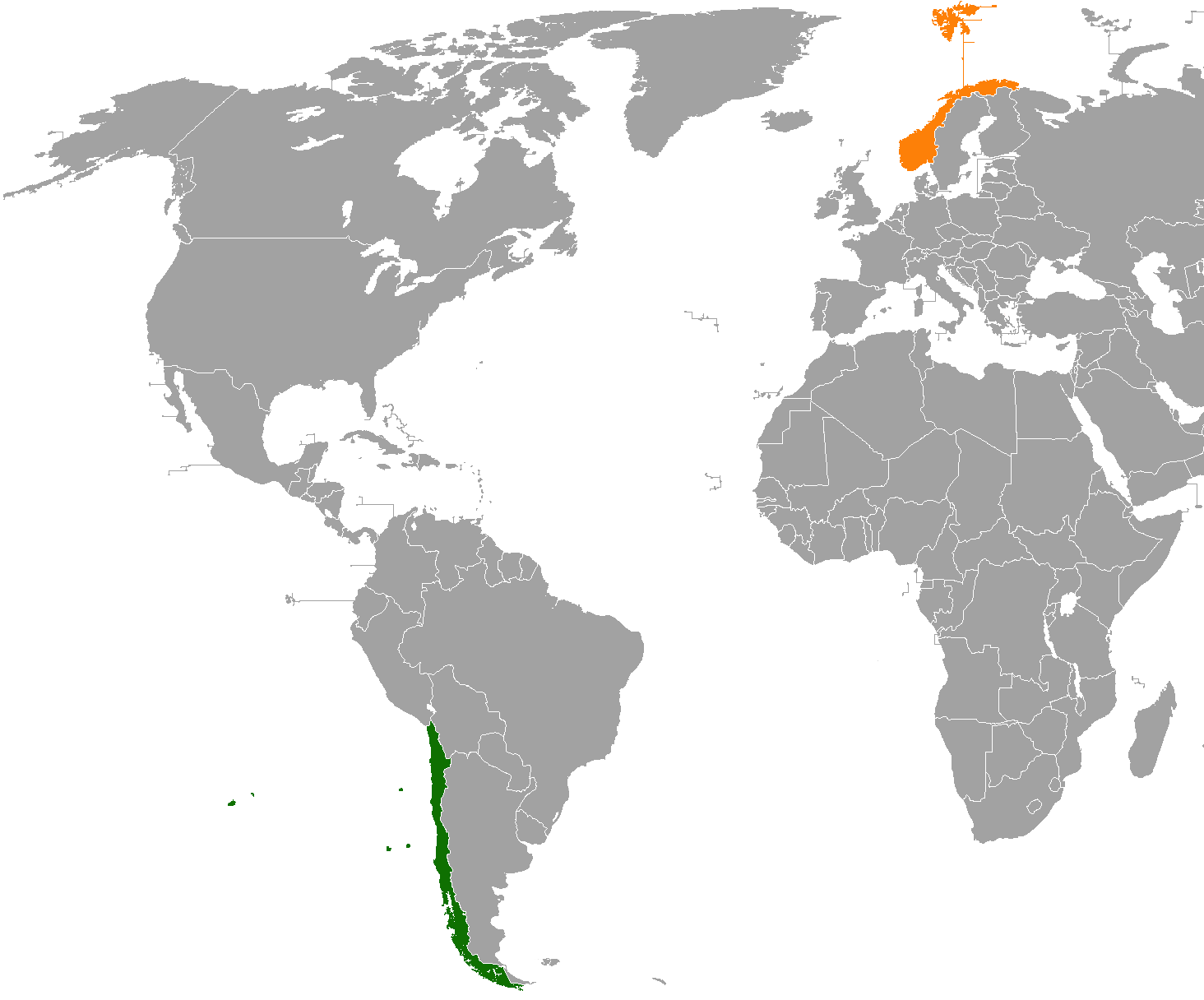
- Chile: Norway

Chile–Norway relations are foreign relations between the Republic of Chile and the Kingdom of Norway. Both nations are members of the OECD, World Trade Organization and the United Nations.

== History ==
Beginning in the early 1800s, Norwegian migrants began arriving to Chile, however, not in large numbers as other European migrants did to Chile. Soon after World War I, Chile and Norway established diplomatic relations. In 1958, Norway opened an embassy in Santiago.

On 11 September 1973, the government of President Salvador Allende suffered a coup d'état by General Augusto Pinochet who was backed by the government of the United States. President Allende was declared to have committed suicide during the coup and General Pinochet took over the government and became the new President of the country. Immediately, President Pinochet began arresting, torturing and executing followers of President Allende. During this time, thousands of Chileans sought refuge in mainly European and Latin American embassies in the Chilean capital. At the time, Norwegian Ambassador in Chile, Frode Nilsen, sheltered over 100 Chileans at the embassy and many of them were later resettled to Norway.

In May 2007, Chilean President Michelle Bachelet paid a visit to Norway. In September 2008, Norwegian Prime Minister Jens Stoltenberg paid a visit to Chile. In 2014, King Harald V of Norway and Queen Sonja of Norway paid a personal trip to Chile to visit Easter Island. In March 2019, the King and Queen returned to Chile on an official visit to celebrate 100 years of diplomatic relations between both nations.

== High-level Visits ==
High-level visits from Chile to Norway

- President Michelle Bachelet (2007)

High-level visits from Norway to Chile

- Prime Minister Jens Stoltenberg (2008)
- Crown Prince Haookon of Norway (2008)
- King Harald V of Norway (2014, 2019)
- Queen Sonja of Norway (2014, 2019)
- Foreign Minister Ine Marie Eriksen Søreide (2019)

== Bilateral relations ==
Both nations have signed a few agreements such as an Agreement on Financial Assistance to the Programs of the Solidarity and Social Investment Fund in Chile (1990); Agreement on Reciprocal Promotion and Protection of Investments (1993); Social Security Agreement (1997); Agreement to Avoid Double Taxation and to Prevent Tax Evasion in Relation to Income and Wealth Taxes and its Protocol (2003); Free Trade Agreement between Chile and the Member States of the European Free Trade Association (which includes Norway) (2003); Memorandum of Understanding on Educational Matters (2008) and a Memorandum of Understanding on Political Consultations (2019).

== Resident diplomatic missions ==
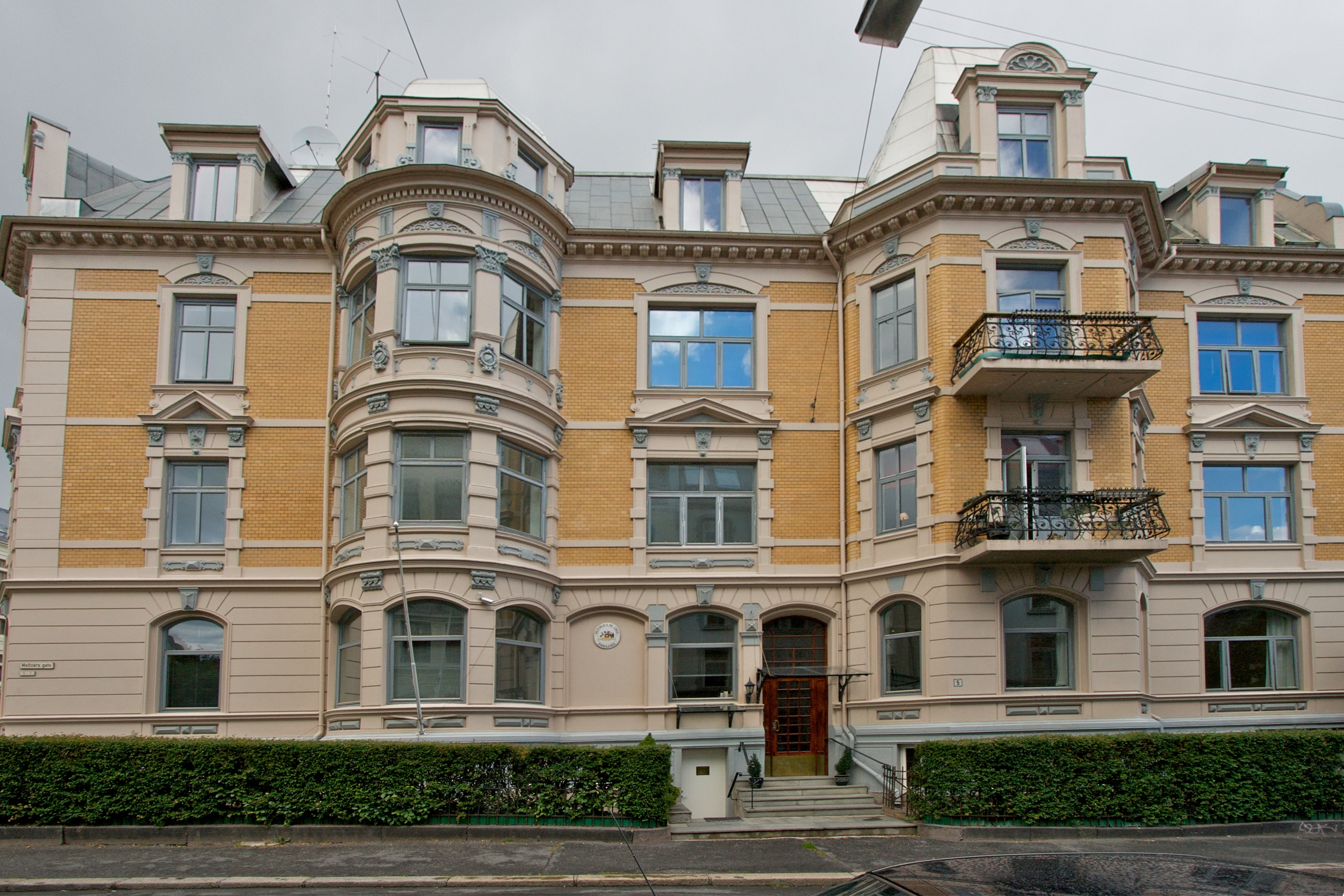
Embassy of Chile in Oslo

- Chile has an embassy in Oslo.
- Norway has an embassy in Santiago.

== See also ==
- Foreign relations of Chile
- Foreign relations of Norway
- Immigration to Norway
