= Chile–Taiwan relations =

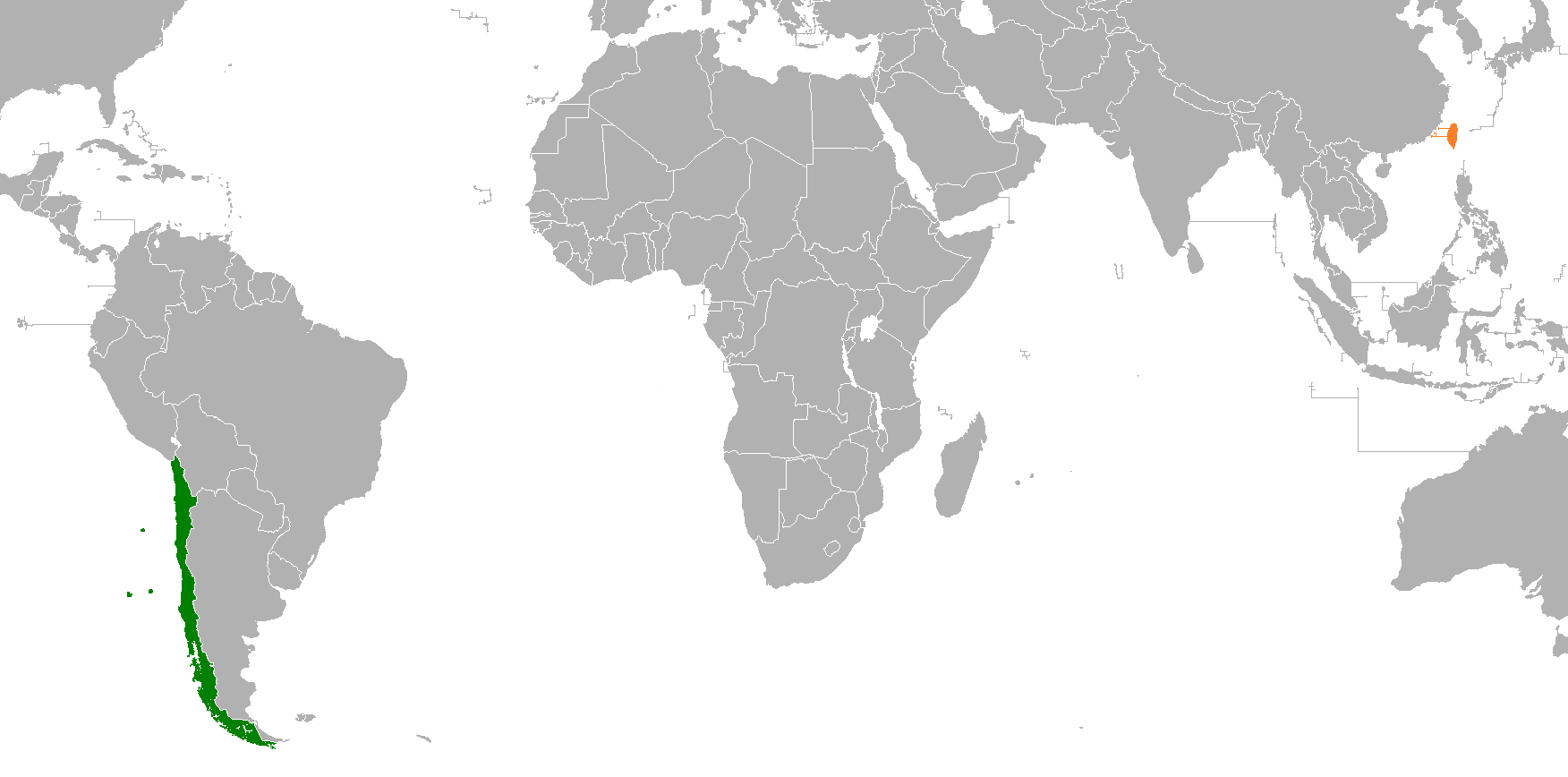
- Chile: Taiwan

Diplomatic mission
- Chilean Trade Office: Taipei Economic and cultural office in Chile

Envoy
- Director Fernando Mariano Schmidt Hernández: Representative Liu, Yu-chi

Chile–Taiwan relations refer to the bilateral relations between the Republic of Chile and the Republic of China (Taiwan).

Like most countries in the world, Chile adheres to a One China policy, therefore it does not maintain official diplomatic ties with Taiwan. However, that does not prevent the two nations from working closely, due to similarities between both countries. Both countries are technically democratic, have strong economic performances and are allies of the United States. Both countries are urging to extend their cooperation together.

== History ==
The indigenous people of Chile might have been traced to share cultural commons with the Taiwanese aborigines for their Austronesian heritages.

In 1915, Chile established relations with the Republic of China. After the Chinese Civil War, Chile maintained relations with the ROC as the true and legitimate representative of the Republic of China until December 1970, when the government of Salvador Allende recognized Communist China. The announcement of the establishment of diplomatic relations between the PRC and Chile was made on 5 January 1971, and on the same day, the ROC announced the termination of diplomatic relations.

In March 1975, during the military dictatorship of General Augusto Pinochet, Chile and Taiwan reestablished relations unofficially, Chile established the Chilean Representative Office in Taipei, while Taiwan established a Taipei Economic and Cultural Office in Santiago. By that time, thousands of Taiwanese came to Chile as immigrants to work.

== Economic relations ==
Chile and Taiwan have been expanding trade relations, although not dramatically, but very strong and fit.

== Resident diplomatic missions ==
- Chile has a Trade Office in Taipei.
- Taiwan has an Economic and Cultural Office in Santiago de Chile.
