= Chile–Romania relations =

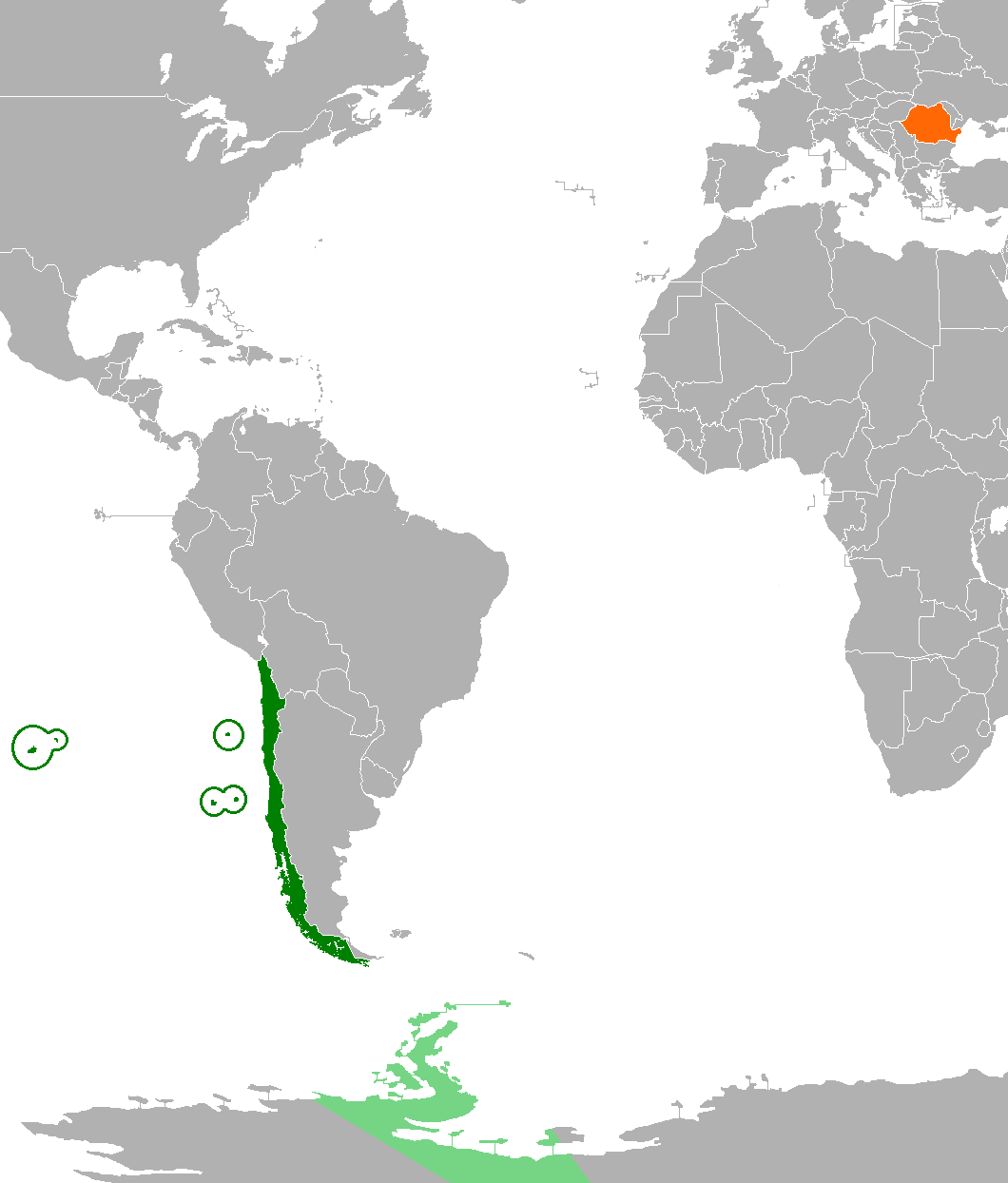
- Chile: Romania

Chile–Romania relations are foreign relations between Chile and Romania. Diplomatic relations between both countries were established on February 5, 1925. Embassies were established in each other's countries that year but the bilateral relations were interrupted in 1943 because of World War II.

In 1965, the diplomatic relations were renewed. Even though most of the Eastern Bloc countries broke their relations with Chile after 1973, Romania refused to sever diplomatic relations.

Chile has an embassy in Bucharest. Romania has an embassy in Santiago.

== See also ==
- Foreign relations of Chile
- Foreign relations of Romania
