= Chile–India relations =

- Chile: India

Diplomatic mission
- Embassy of Chile, New Delhi: Embassy of India, Santiago

Envoy
- Ambassador Juan Angulo: Charge d'affaires Shri Shuban Krishen

Chile–India relations are the foreign relations between Chile and India. Chilean President Gabriel Boric made a 5 day visit to India in April 2025. He met with his Indian counterpart Prime Minister Narendra Modi. During their meeting, the two leaders comprehensively reviewed the entire gamut of bilateral relations spanning a wide range of sectors, including trade and investment, health and pharmaceuticals, defense and security, infrastructure, mining and mineral resources, agriculture and food security, green energy, ICT, digitization, innovation, disaster management, cooperation in science and technology, education and people-to-people linkages and also agreed to continue regular exchanges at various levels to give further momentum to the bilateral relationship.

== Trade Relations ==
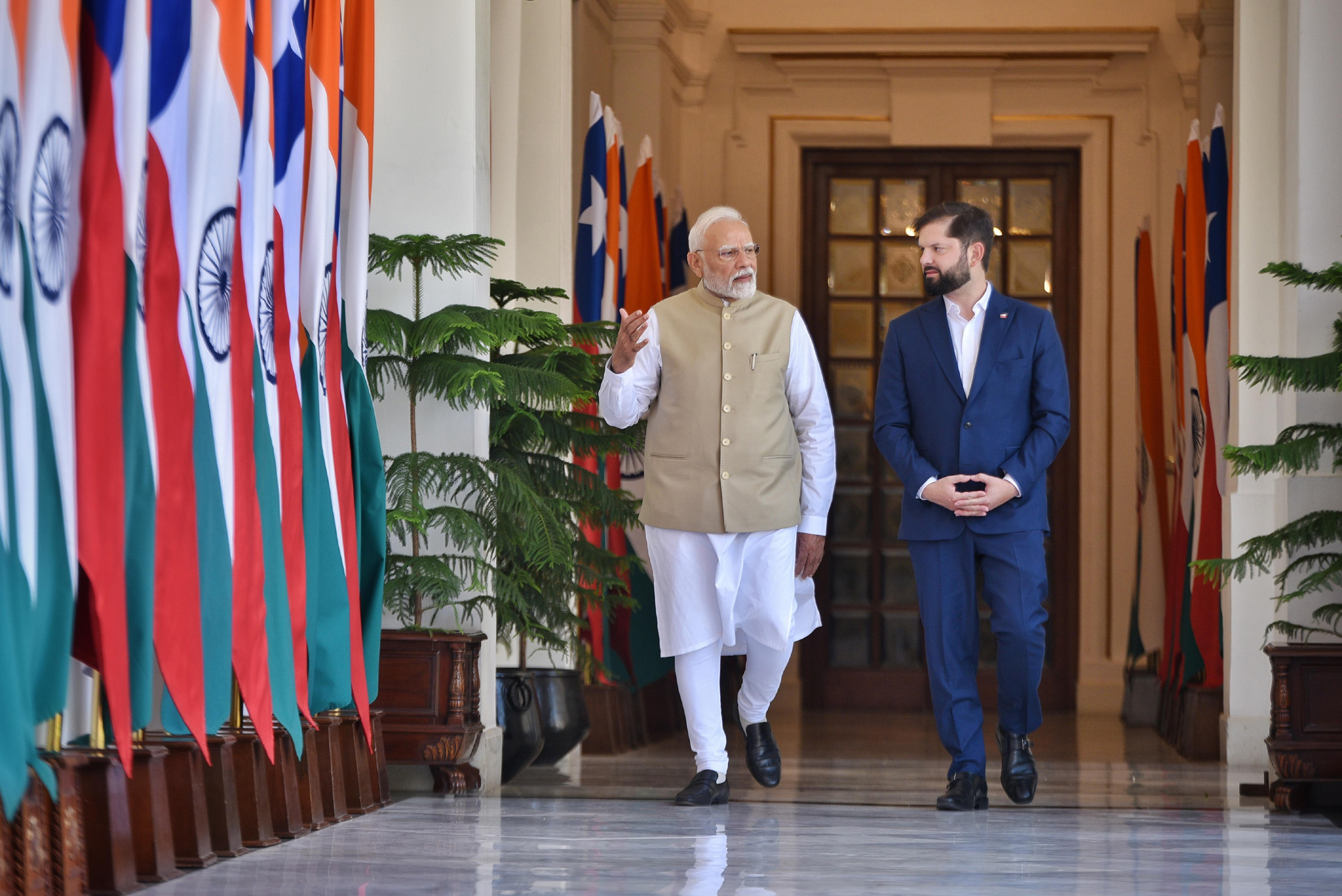
PM Narendra Modi meeting President Gabriel Boric in New Delhi on April 1, 2025

Chile was the first country in South America to sign a trade agreement with India, in 1956. A Framework Agreement was signed on January 20, 2005 to promote further Economic Cooperation between India and Chile. The agreement proposed a Preferential Trade Agreement (PTA) between the respective countries, which after several rounds of negotiations was finalized during the talks held at New Delhi in November 2005. The PTA came into force with effect from 17 August 2007 in Chile and in India on 11 September 2007.

In 2016, both countries signed an agreement to expand the India- Chile Preferential Trade Agreement (PTA), marking a 10-fold jump in the number of products to be traded on concessional duty rates. India's bilateral trade with Chile stood at $2.6 billion with exports at $0.68 billion and imports at $1.96 billion respectively in FY16.

In 2024, bilateral trade between India and Chile favored Chile, which exported $2.56 billion to India, primarily led by copper ore ($1.38B), while importing $1.28 billion from India, where cars served as the top export ($272M). By August 2026, total trade continued to expand; India’s monthly exports to Chile rose to $123 million (driven by motor vehicles, pharmaceuticals, and marine products), while imports from Chile surged to $670 million due to increased shipments of bulk minerals, ores, gold, and fresh fruits. Overall, India maintains a trade deficit with Chile, driven by it's demand for Chilean natural resources. Between 2020 and 2025, Chilean exports to India grew from $763 million to over $4 billion, representing an average annual growth rate of 29.8%

== Indians in Chile ==
The Indian community in Chile numbers around 1000+, mostly residing in Santiago, Iquique, Viña del Mar, and Punta Arenas. Largely engaged in small business and trade, the community is gradually being assimilated into the mainstream through naturalisation. An average of 1000 Chileans visit India annually, mainly for tourism.

== Resident diplomatic missions ==
of Chile in India

- New Delhi (Embassy)
- Mumbai (Consulate-General)

of India in Chile

- Santiago (Embassy)

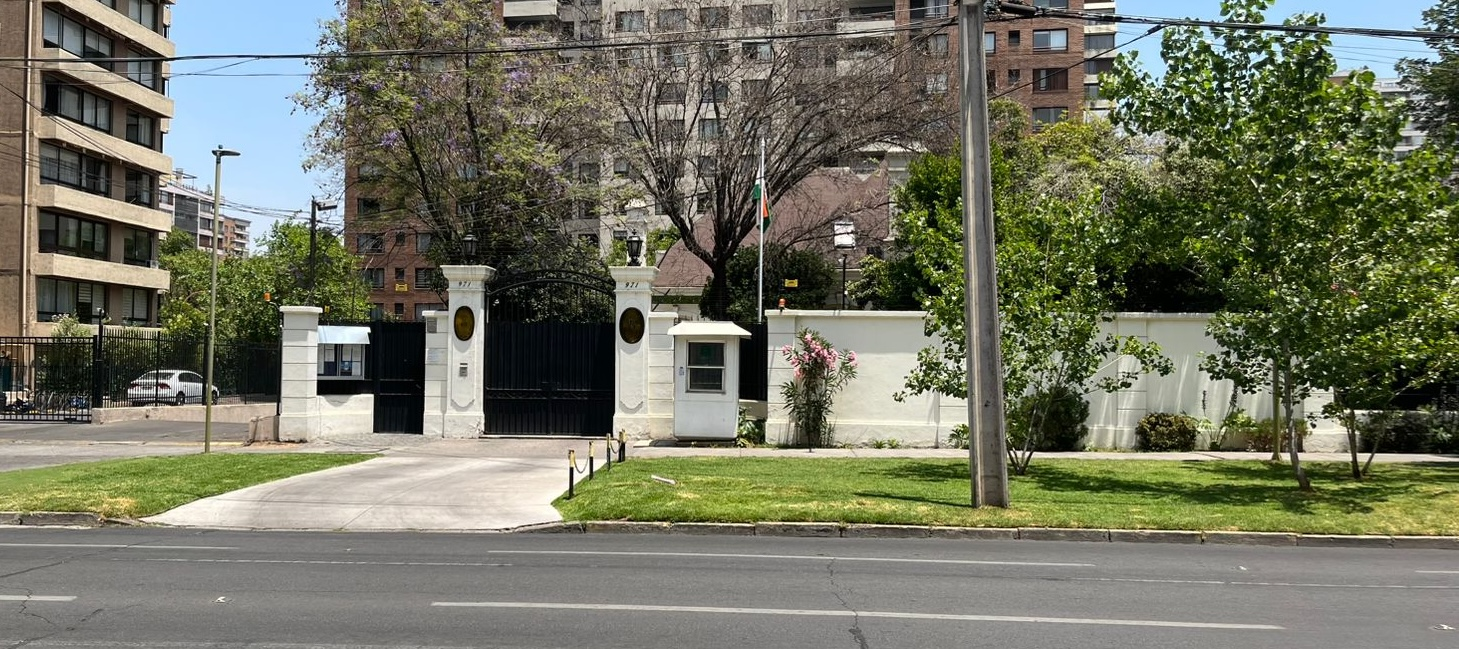
Embassy of India in Santiago
