= Chile–Malaysia relations =

- Chile: Malaysia

Chile–Malaysia relations refers to foreign relations between Malaysia and Chile. Chile has an embassy in Kuala Lumpur, and Malaysia has an embassy in Santiago. Both countries are members of APEC.

== History ==
Relations between the two countries were established on 22 May 1979, with the embassy of Chile being opened in 1989.

== Economic relations ==
Relations between both countries are mainly based on trade, with Malaysia becoming Chile's main trading partner in Southeast Asia with the total trade in 1990 reaching $800 million. In the same year, a special scheme to help foreign businessmen visit Malaysia was proposed by Malaysian Deputy Prime Minister Ghafar Baba following his visit to Chile. Both Chile and Malaysia agreed to set up a joint committee to co-operate in the information and broadcasting field in 1994. Economic relations between the two countries are based on the South-South co-operation and pacts on bilateral trade were signed in 1995. In 2009, the total trade between Chile and Malaysia is $336 million with the total Malaysian export to Chile being $16.8 million while the import being $148.7 million. Chilean cuisine started to be promoted to Malaysia in the same year. A memorandum of understanding (MoU) to improve air links was signed in 2010, with the tariff on trade agreement scrapped the same year. The two countries' free trade agreement took effect from 2011, as a joint study group had been formed since 2006 for the treaty. Chile has developed joint ventures in shipbuilding through ASMAR with a tanker and two tugboats being built in Kuching, Malaysia. On the Malaysian side, a Malaysian car model of Proton has now been exported to Chile.

== State visits ==
Malaysian Prime Minister Mahathir Mohamad visited Chile in July 1991 at the invitation of President Patricio Aylwin. During the visit, both leaders agreed to enhance bilateral ties and establish embassies in each other's countries, leading to the opening of the Malaysian Embassy in Santiago in December 1991.

Aylwin later visited Malaysia in June 1992, followed by President Eduardo Frei Ruiz-Tagle, who made a State Visit to Malaysia in November 1995 upon the invitation of Yang Di-Pertuan Agong, Tuanku Ja'afar. Earlier that year, in September 1995, Tuanku Jaafar had also visited Chile. The most recent State Visit from Malaysia was in 2009 by Yang Di-Pertuan Agong, Mizan Zainal Abidin of Terengganu. Since Mahathir's 1991 trip, no Malaysian Prime Minister has made an official visit to Chile.
