= Chile–Indonesia Comprehensive Economic Partnership Agreement =

The Chile–Indonesia Comprehensive Economic Partnership Agreement is a bilateral free trade agreement signed between Chile and Indonesia in December 2017 and in effect since August 2019.

== Terms ==
The agreement covered a gradual elimination of tariffs on 9,308 items exported by Chile to Indonesia (including copper, olive oil and dairy products) and 7,669 items being exported by Indonesia to Chile (including palm oil, automotive products and footwear). Out of the 7,669 Indonesian products, 6,704 immediately had tariffs eliminated once the agreement entered into force, while the rest were to have tariffs eliminated within 6 years of the implementation.

== History ==
Chilean and Indonesian governments first agreed to form a joint study group for a potential trade agreement in November 2008, receiving the final report by November 2009. The first negotiations did not begin until five years later in May 2014 in Santiago, and after three years of pause the negotiations resumed with another round in Jakarta during March 2017. Three further rounds were held throughout 2017, and on 14 December 2017 the formal agreement was signed in Santiago between Chilean Foreign Minister Heraldo Muñoz and Indonesian Trade Minister Enggartiasto Lukita.

The Indonesian People's Representative Council and the Senate of Chile ratified the agreement on 6 June 2018 and 28 November 2018, respectively. The agreement entered into force on 10 August 2019. Chile was the first country in Latin America to have a bilateral trade agreement with Indonesia.

In addition to the free trade agreement, both countries had agreed to enter negotiations regarding trade in services, a process expected to begin in the last quarter of 2020.
