= Chile–Kenya relations =

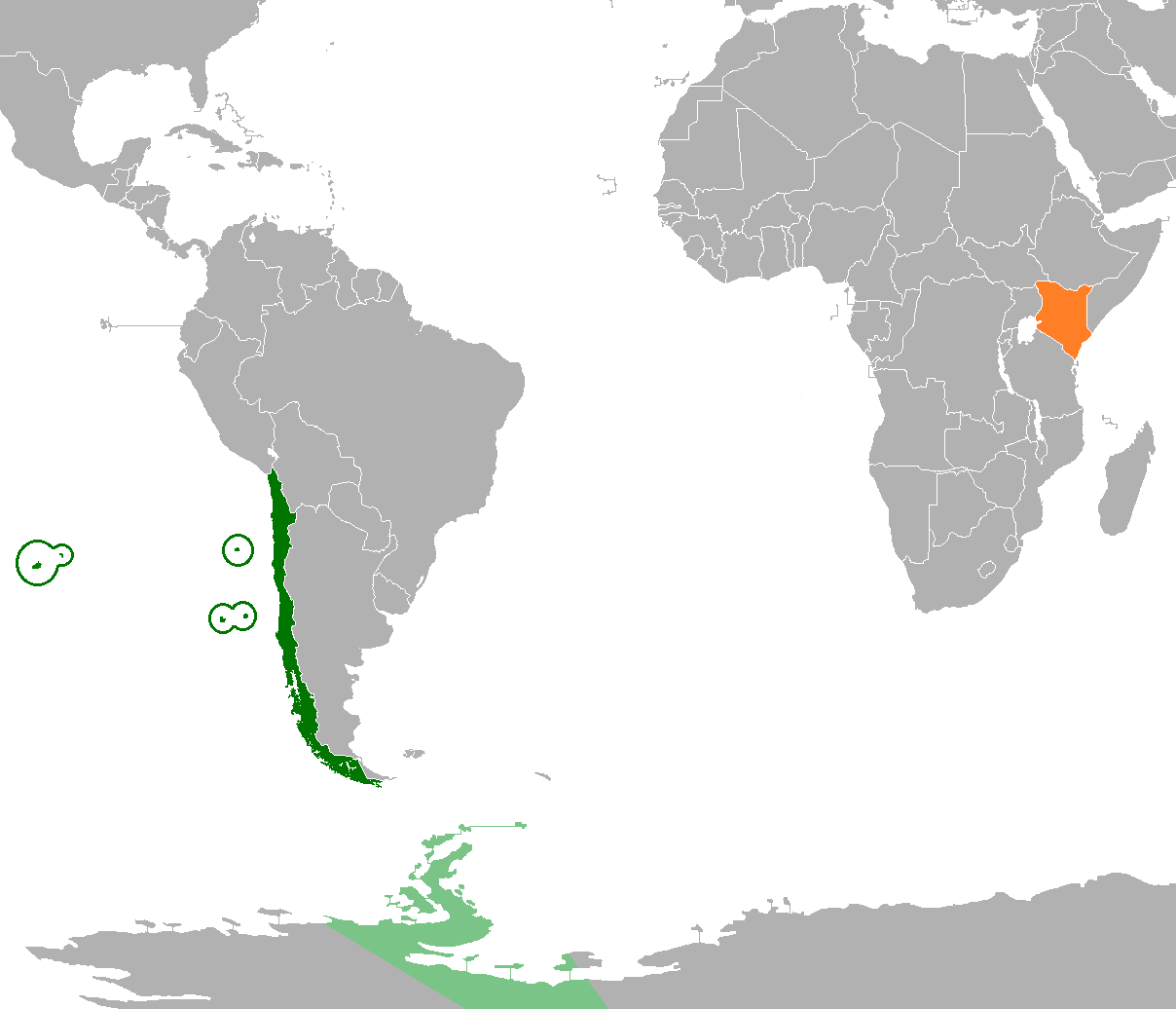
- Chile: Kenya

Chile–Kenya relations refers to the current and historical relations between Chile and Kenya. Both nations are members of the Group of 77 and the United Nations.

== History ==
Chile and Kenya established diplomatic relations in 1975, twelve years after Kenya gained independence from the United Kingdom. Relations between both nations have taken place primarily in multilateral organizations, such as at the United Nations.

In November 2007, the first Intergovernmental Seminar on Development Cooperation between Chile and East African Countries was held in Nairobi and attended by Kenyan government officials and the head of Chile's Internal Revenue Service. In March 2019, Chilean Minister of the Environment, Carolina Schmidt, paid a visit to Kenya to attend the Fourth UN Assembly on the Environment. In September 2013, Kenyan Vice-Minister for Sports, Culture and the Arts, Patrick Omutia, paid a visit to Chile and met with this counterpart to sign a sports agreement between both nations.

In October 2019, Chilean Foreign Undersecretary, Carolina Valdivia, paid a visit to Kenya where she co-chaired the First Round of Chile–Kenya Political Consultations, a bilateral meeting in which important aspects of the agenda between the two nations were discussed, in addition to cooperation initiatives and multilateral themes of regional and global interest.

== Bilateral agreements ==
Both nations have signed several agreements such as an Agreement on Scientific and Technological Cooperation (1991); Memorandum of Understanding for the Modernization of the Kenya Revenue Authority (2007); Agreement for the exemption of visas in diplomatic and official passports; Memorandum of Understanding of Cooperation between the Chilean National Institute of Sport and the Kenyan Ministry of Sports, Culture and the Arts (2013); Memorandum of Understanding in Exchange Experiences in Forest Cooperation; Memorandum of Understanding in Cooperation in National Parks Preservation; Agreement creating the Joint Cooperation Commission for Commerce and Investment (2019); Agreement of Cooperation between the Chilean Diplomatic Academy and the Kenyan Foreign Service Institute (2019); and a Memorandum of Understanding on Gender Cooperation.

== Resident diplomatic missions ==
- Chile has an embassy in Nairobi.
- Kenya is accredited to Chile from its embassy in Brasília, Brazil.
