= List of international presidential trips made by Michelle Bachelet =

This is a list of international trips made by Chilean President Michelle Bachelet in her first and second terms as the 33rd and 35th President of Chile.

== Summary of international trips ==
Number of visits	Country
1 visit	Angola, Belgium, Costa Rica, Dominican Republic, Finland, Germany, Guatemala, Honduras, India, Jamaica, Morocco, Mozambique, Netherlands, Norway, Paraguay, Philippines, Portugal, Russia, Singapore, South Africa, South Korea, Spain, Sweden, Switzerland, Trinidad and Tobago, Uruguay
2 visits	Bolivia, Canada, Colombia, El Salvador, Guyana, Italy, Japan, United Kingdom, Vatican, Vietnam
3 visits	Cuba, Ecuador, France, Haiti
4 visits	Argentina, Brazil, China, Mexico, Peru
14 visits	United States

== First term (2006–2010) ==
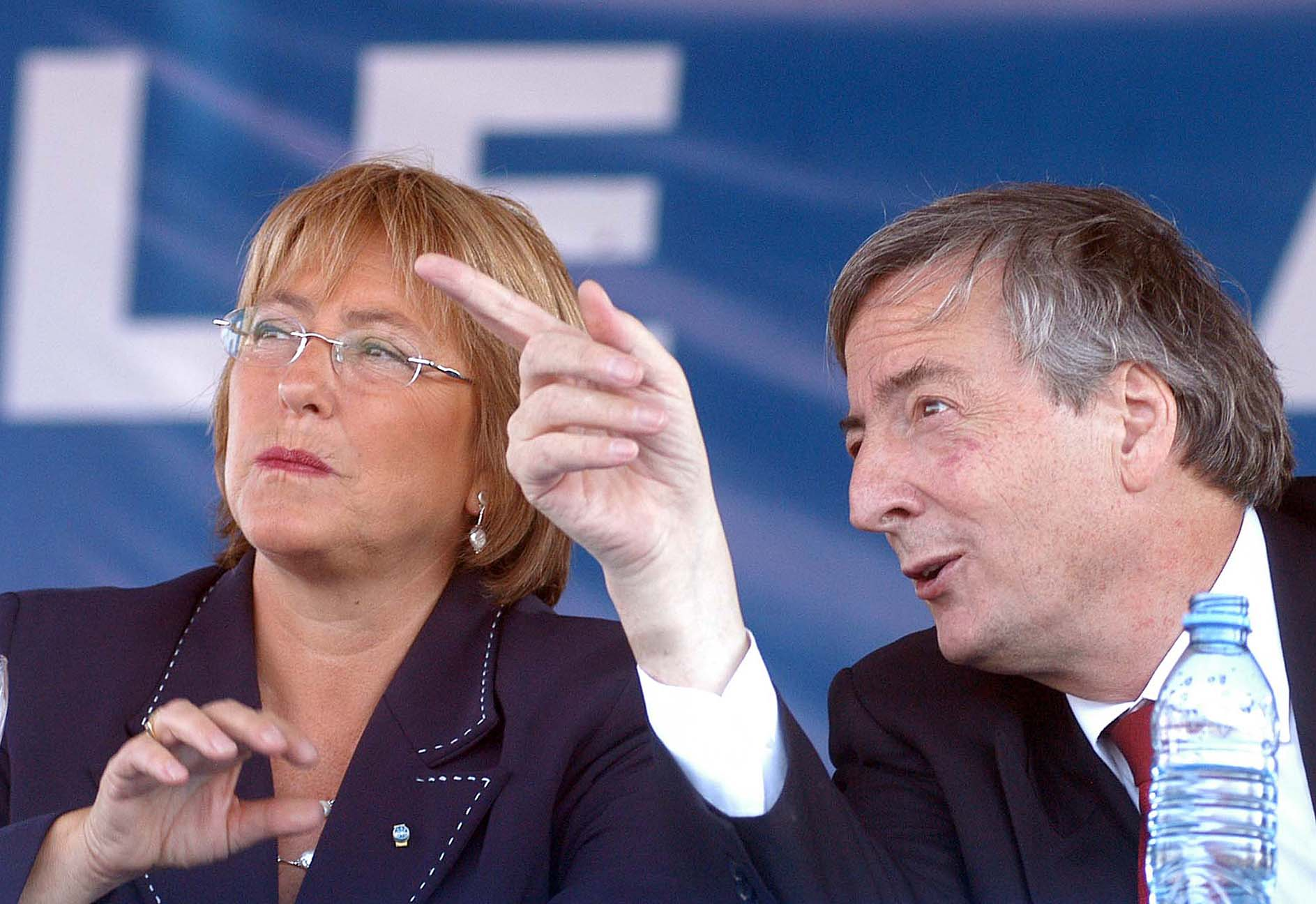
President Bachelet with Argentine president Néstor Kirchner.

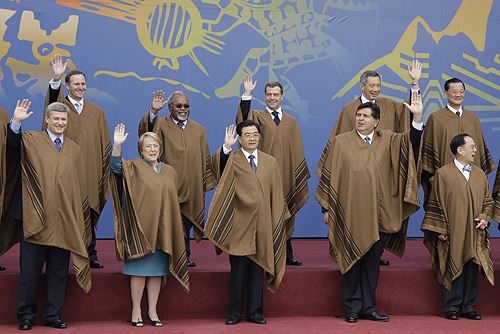
President Bachelet attending the 2008 APEC Summit hosted in Peru.

=== 2006 ===
Country	Areas visited	Date(s)	Notes
Argentina	Buenos Aires	21 March	Further information: Argentina–Chile relations First official visit abroad as president. Met with President Néstor Kirchner and signed bilateral agreements on energy security and infrastructure, including plans for a bidding process to reactivate the Transandine Railway.
Spain	Madrid	9 – 10 May	Further information: Chile–Spain relations State visit. Received the 2006 Nueva Economía Forum award and took part in high-level meetings.
United States	Washington, D.C.	8 – 9 June	Further information: Chile–United States relations Official working visit. Held talks with President George W. Bush at the White House, took part in reproductive health forums and discussed hemispheric issues.
Jamaica	Kingston	9 June	Further information: Foreign relations of Chile Official visit. Several cooperation agreements were signed.
Haiti	Port-au-Prince	8 – 9 June	Official visit. Met with President René Préval and visited the Chilean troops deployed as part of the UN peacekeeping mission.
Colombia	Bogotá	6 – 7 August	Further information: Chile–Colombia relations Attended the second inauguration of President Álvaro Uribe. Held multilateral meetings with other regional leaders.
United States	New York	20 – 22 September	Further information: Chile–United States relations Addressed the 61st UN General Assembly, her first address to the Assembly as president.
Germany	Berlin Stuttgart	18 – 21 October	Further information: Chile–Germany relations First official visit to Germany as president. Met with Chancellor Angela Merkel and President Horst Köhler. Awarded an honorary doctorate by the Charité – Universitätsmedizin Berlin.
Uruguay	Montevideo	3 – 5 November	Further information: Chile–Uruguay relations Participated in the XVI Ibero-American Summit. Met with Portuguese President Aníbal Cavaco Silva and Prime Minister José Sócrates, and discussed a prospective free trade agreement with Colombian President Álvaro Uribe.
Vietnam	Hanoi	16 – 19 November	State visit. Attended the 14th APEC Economic Leaders' Meeting.
Bolivia	Cochabamba	8 – 9 December	Participated in the II Summit of the South American Community of Nations, the forerunner of UNASUR.

=== 2007 ===
Country	Areas visited	Date(s)	Notes
Brazil	Rio de Janeiro	18 – 19 January	Further information: Brazil–Chile relations Participated in the XXXI Mercosur Presidential Summit.
Guyana	Georgetown	2 – 5 March	Attended the 19th Rio Group Summit. Met with President Bharrat Jagdeo to discuss education, health and poverty alleviation programs.
Mexico	Mexico City	19 – 21 March	Further information: Chile–Mexico relations State visit. Addressed a solemn joint session of the Mexican Congress at the Palacio Legislativo de San Lázaro (20 March).
Finland	Helsinki	28 – 30 May	Official visit, first leg of a tour of northern Europe.
Norway	Oslo	30 – 31 May	Official visit. Met with Prime Minister Jens Stoltenberg.
Switzerland	Geneva	1 – 4 June	Official visit.
Japan	Tokyo	2 – 5 September	Further information: Chile–Japan relations Met with Prime Minister Shinzo Abe. The two leaders pledged to boost trade under the Japan–Chile Economic Partnership Agreement.
United States	New York	24 – 25 September	Further information: Chile–United States relations Participated in the 62nd UN General Assembly.
Bolivia	La Paz	16 December	Named "Distinguished Guest" (Huésped Ilustre) of La Paz.

=== 2008 ===
Country	Areas visited	Date(s)	Notes
Dominican Republic	Santo Domingo	6 – 7 March	Participated in the XX Rio Group Summit. Accompanied by Foreign Minister Alejandro Foxley and Energy Minister Marcelo Tokman.
United Kingdom	London	3 – 5 April	Further information: Chile–United Kingdom relations Official visit.
China	Beijing	11 – 15 April	Further information: Chile–China relations Official visit.
Brazil	Brasília	23 May	Further information: Brazil–Chile relations Attended the UNASUR summit, where she was named the bloc's first pro tempore president.
Canada	Ottawa Quebec City Montreal	8 – 11 June	Further information: Canada–Chile relations Working visit leading a delegation of government and business representatives. Met with Prime Minister Stephen Harper in Ottawa to discuss trade, investment and education. Took part in the celebrations of Quebec City's 400th anniversary and was a keynote speaker at the International Economic Forum of the Americas (Conference of Montreal).
United States	New York	23 – 25 September	Further information: Chile–United States relations Participated in the 63rd UN General Assembly and met with UNASUR presidents.
Argentina	Buenos Aires	5 – 6 October	Further information: Argentina–Chile relations Met with President Cristina Fernández de Kirchner.
Costa Rica	San José	28 – 29 October	Official visit.
El Salvador	San Salvador	29 – 31 October	Participated in the XVIII Ibero-American Summit and held trade talks.
Peru	Lima	21 – 23 November	Further information: Chile–Peru relations Participated in the 2008 APEC Summit.
Brazil	Costa do Sauípe	16 – 17 December	Further information: Brazil–Chile relations Participated in the Latin American and Caribbean summits held in Brazil.

=== 2009 ===
Country	Areas visited	Date(s)	Notes
Honduras	Tegucigalpa	9 – 10 February	State visit. Met with President Manuel Zelaya and signed bilateral economic and technical cooperation agreements. Spoke at a summit on female leadership.
Cuba	Havana	11 – 13 February	Official visit, the first by a Chilean head of state to Cuba in 37 years. Attended the Havana International Book Fair, met with President Raúl Castro and held a meeting with former leader Fidel Castro.
India	New Delhi Agra Mumbai Chennai	16 – 20 March	State visit. Aimed to strengthen trade, cooperation and diplomatic ties.
Russia	Moscow	2 – 4 April	Official visit. Received by Prime Minister Vladimir Putin at his residence.
Netherlands	The Hague Leiden	25 May	State visit hosted by Queen Beatrix. In Leiden with Queen Beatrix and Princess Máxima, signed several memoranda of understanding and spoke on democratic development.
France	Paris	28 May	Further information: Chile–France relations Official visit, beginning at UNESCO.
United States	Washington, D.C.	22 – 23 June	Further information: Chile–United States relations Met with President Barack Obama.
Paraguay	Luque Asunción	22 – 24 July	Further information: Chile–Paraguay relations Participated in the XXXVII Mercosur Summit.
Ecuador	Quito	9 – 10 August	Attended the re-inauguration of President Rafael Correa for his second term.
United States	New York	23 – 25 September	Further information: Chile–United States relations Addressed the 64th UN General Assembly.
South Korea	Seoul	9 – 11 November	Met with President Lee Myung-bak.
China	Shanghai	12 November	Further information: Chile–China relations Stopover visit.
Singapore	Singapore	15 November	Participated in the 2009 APEC Summit.
Italy	Rome	16 November	Further information: Chile–Italy relations Participated in the FAO World Summit on Food Security.
Vatican		16 November	Visit to the Holy See.
Portugal	Lisbon	1 – 2 December	Met with President Aníbal Cavaco Silva.

=== 2010 ===
Country	Areas visited	Date(s)	Notes
Haiti	Port-au-Prince	20 February	Led a tribute to representatives of the Chilean troops who served in the peace mission in Haiti.
Guatemala	Guatemala City	20 – 21 February	Met with President Álvaro Colom.
Mexico	Cancún	22 – 23 February	Further information: Chile–Mexico relations Attended the XXI Rio Group Summit, where she introduced President-elect Sebastián Piñera.
Trinidad and Tobago	Port of Spain	23 February	Brief visit.

== Second term (2014–2018) ==
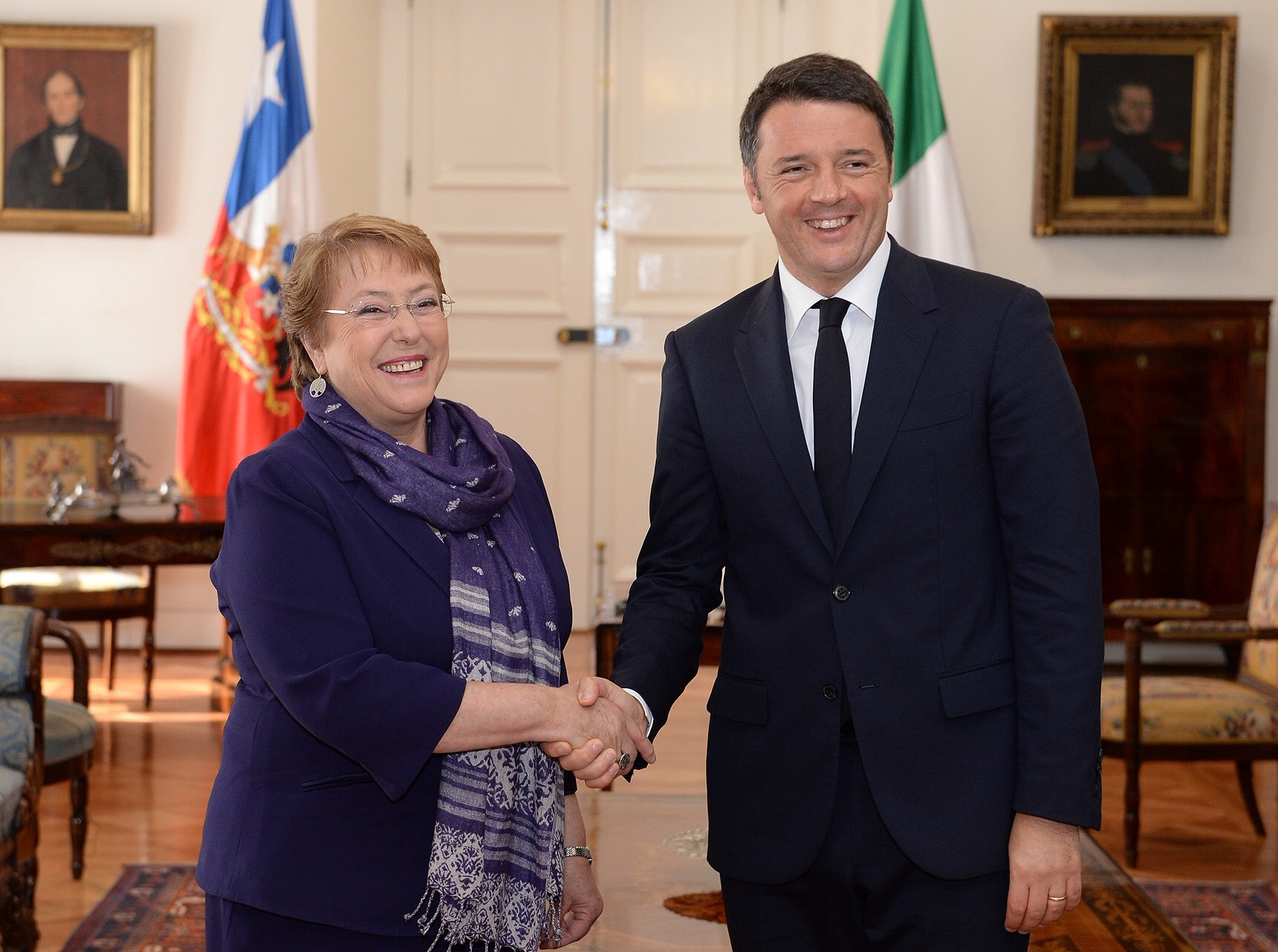
President Bachelet with Italian Prime Minister Matteo Renzi in 2015.

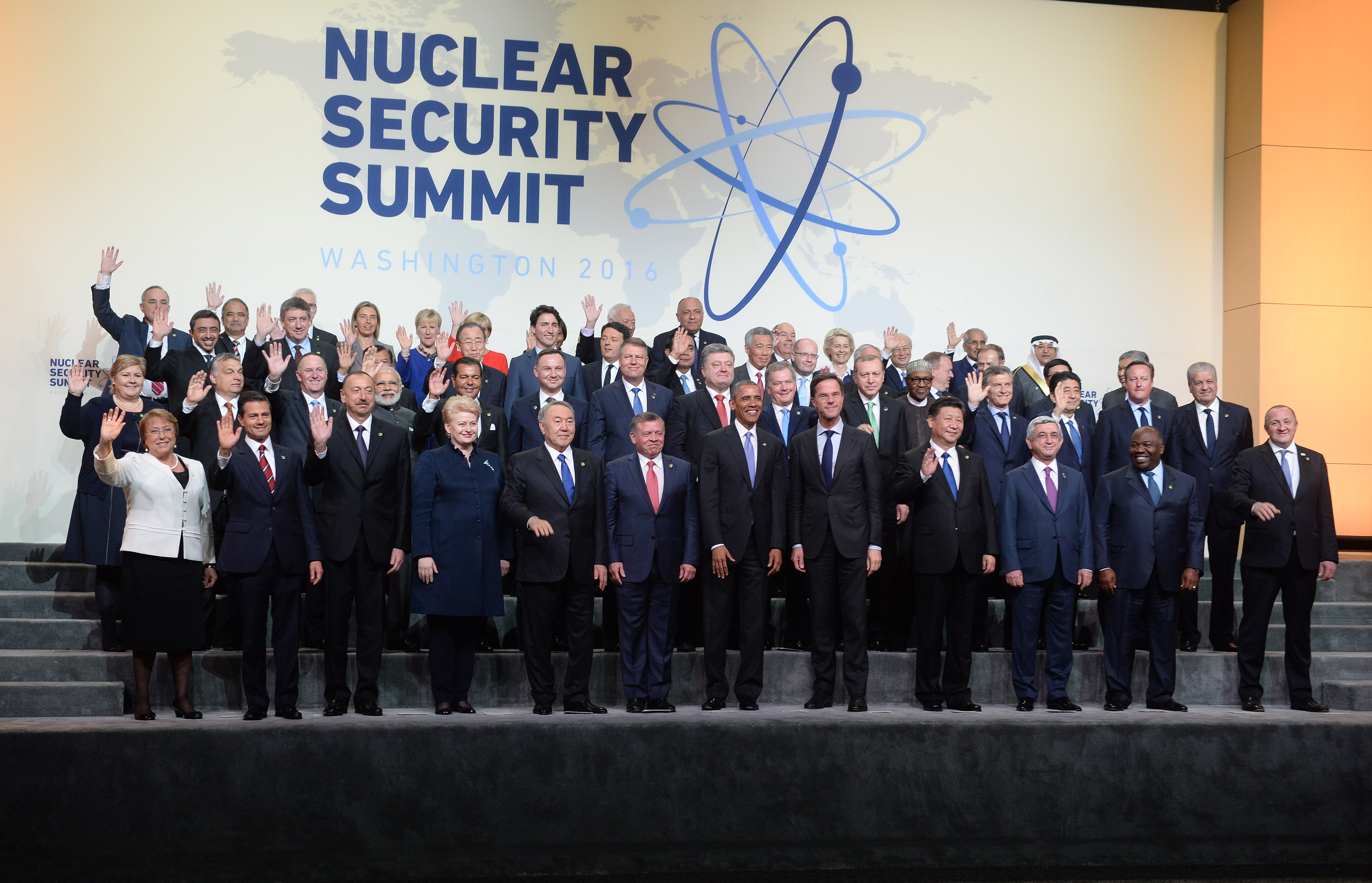
President Bachelet (bottom left) attending the 2016 Nuclear Security Summit.

=== 2014 ===
Country	Areas visited	Date(s)	Notes
Argentina	Buenos Aires	12 May	Further information: Argentina–Chile relations First trip abroad of her second term.
United States	Washington, D.C.	29 – 30 June	Further information: Chile–United States relations Working visit. Departure was delayed by a few hours on 29 June so she could welcome the national football team at La Moneda Palace on its return from the 2014 FIFA World Cup. Scheduled to meet with President Barack Obama at the White House on 30 June.
South Africa	Pretoria	8 – 10 August	Signed a joint declaration with South Africa.
Mozambique	Maputo	10 – 11 August	Official visit.
Angola	Luanda	11 – 12 August	Official visit.
United States	New York	22 – 25 September	Further information: Chile–United States relations Addressed the general debate of the 69th UN General Assembly on 24 September, the first Latin American and Caribbean leader to speak. Stressed inequality, tax and political reform, and climate change.
China	Beijing	8 – 12 November	Further information: Chile–China relations Participated in the 2014 APEC Summit.
Ecuador	Guayaquil	4 December	Participated in a UNASUR summit.
Mexico	Veracruz	7 – 9 December	Further information: Chile–Mexico relations Participated in the XXIV Ibero-American Summit.
Peru	Lima	10 December	Further information: Chile–Peru relations Met with President Ollanta Humala during the COP20 climate conference.

=== 2015 ===
Country	Areas visited	Date(s)	Notes
United States	New York	18 – 20 January	Further information: Chile–United States relations Official tour of the United States.
Italy	Rome	4 – 6 June	Further information: Chile–Italy relations First stop of a European tour.
Vatican		4 – 6 June	Visit to the Holy See during the European tour.
France	Paris	8 – 9 June	Further information: Chile–France relations Official visit. Met with President François Hollande, who hosted a dinner in her honour at the Élysée Palace, and with Prime Minister Manuel Valls. The two presidents signed a joint declaration on strengthening their strategic partnership. Received an honorary doctorate from Sorbonne Nouvelle – Paris 3 and met with OECD Secretary-General Ángel Gurría.
Belgium	Brussels	10 – 11 June	Attended the EU–CELAC summit.
Peru	Lima	2 July	Further information: Chile–Peru relations Trip delayed by a malfunction of the presidential aircraft.
Mexico	Mexico City	12 – 14 August	Further information: Chile–Mexico relations State visit. Met with President Enrique Peña Nieto.
El Salvador	San Salvador	14 August	State visit.
United States	New York	24 – 28 September	Further information: Chile–United States relations Participated in the 70th UN General Assembly. Trip delayed to monitor the International Court of Justice ruling in the Bolivia v. Chile case.
Ecuador	Quito	15 October	Official visit.
Philippines	Manila	16 – 20 November	State visit. Participated in the 2015 APEC Summit.
France	Paris	30 November	Further information: Chile–France relations Participated in the COP21 climate conference.
Argentina	Buenos Aires	10 December	Further information: Argentina–Chile relations Attended the inauguration of President Mauricio Macri.

=== 2016 ===
Country	Areas visited	Date(s)	Notes
United States	Washington, D.C.	30 March	Further information: Chile–United States relations Attended the 2016 Nuclear Security Summit.
Sweden	Stockholm	10 – 12 May	State visit. Thanked Sweden for its help to Chileans during the dictatorship.
United Kingdom	London	12 – 13 May	Further information: Chile–United Kingdom relations Met with Prime Minister David Cameron.
Cuba	Havana	22 – 24 June	Attended the signing of the ceasefire agreement between the Colombian government and the FARC.
Guyana	Georgetown	4 – 5 July	Attended the 37th Meeting of the Conference of Heads of Government of the CARICOM as an official visitor.
United States	New York	19 – 23 September	Further information: Chile–United States relations Participated in the 71st UN General Assembly.
Colombia	Cartagena	28 – 29 October	Further information: Chile–Colombia relations Participated in the XXV Ibero-American Summit.
Morocco	Marrakesh	14 – 15 November	Participated in the COP22 climate conference.
Peru	Lima	19 – 20 November	Further information: Chile–Peru relations Participated in the 2016 APEC Summit.

=== 2017 ===
Country	Areas visited	Date(s)	Notes
Haiti	Port-au-Prince	27 March	Addressed the migration crisis affecting Haitians.
China	Beijing	12 – 15 May	Further information: Chile–China relations Official visit. Signed about ten economic agreements.
Canada	Ottawa	4 – 6 June	Further information: Canada–Chile relations State visit.
United States	Seattle	6 – 7 June	Further information: Chile–United States relations Met with Governor Jay Inslee.
United States	New York	19 – 22 September	Further information: Chile–United States relations Participated in the 72nd UN General Assembly and signed the Treaty on the Prohibition of Nuclear Weapons.
Brazil	São Paulo	10 October	Further information: Brazil–Chile relations Travelled to watch the national football team play Brazil in World Cup qualifying. The trip's cost drew public attention.
Vietnam	Hanoi	16 – 19 November	Four-day visit to attend the 2017 APEC Summit. Met with President Nguyễn Minh Triết and held scheduled meetings with other APEC leaders, including Hu Jintao, Shinzo Abe and Helen Clark. Continued on to New Zealand.

=== 2018 ===
Country	Areas visited	Date(s)	Notes
Cuba	Havana	7 – 8 January	Further information: Chile–Cuba relations Official visit. Met with President Raúl Castro at the Council of State and attended a dinner in her honour. The programme also included a Chile–Cuba business seminar and a meeting with Cardinal Jaime Ortega.
Japan	Tokyo Nagasaki	22 – 26 February	Further information: Chile–Japan relations Official working visit. Held a summit meeting with Prime Minister Shinzo Abe, attended a signing ceremony for bilateral cooperation memoranda, and attended a dinner banquet hosted in her honour. She also made a state call on Emperor Akihito and visited Nagasaki. This was her last international trip as president.

== See also ==
- List of international presidential trips made by Sebastián Piñera, both her predecessor and successor
