= Americans and Canadians in Chile =

American-Chilean Canadian-Chilean chileno-estadounidense chileno-canadiense
Total population
- Small minority (unknown population figures).

Regions with significant populations
- Chile

Languages
- Chilean Spanish, American English, Canadian English, Canadian French

Religion
- Roman Catholicism · Protestantism

Related ethnic groups
- Americans · Canadians · Mexicans · Cherokee people · British Chileans.

American Chileans and Canadian Chileans are among roughly 300,000 Chileans of North American ancestry (includes Americans and Canadians). 19th century settlement and land speculation deals brought tens of thousands of Americans to Chile with the rest of Central and South America.

== History ==
=== Immigration ===
Along with the British, Americans came to Chile to develop the country's economy and trade from the early 19th century onwards. Even though very few compared to the British, they did contribute to Chile's wealth and economic development well into the 20th century. Other English speaking immigrants included Irish, New Zealanders and Australians.

Valparaíso was on the route from Britain to California, which the United States won from Mexico in 1845. That same port was even the scene of one of the battles of the Anglo-American War of 1812. In 1818, the periodical El Argos de Chile published a sketch of a North American, critical of American materialism.

One American who was in Chile was Wheelwright, who introduced the railway in Chile and nearby Peru in the 1850s. In the California Gold Rush, a massive influx of Chilean miners went to California and many had returned to Chile wealthier than before.

To Chileans, Americans, almost all of British ancestry at the time, were so similar to the British that they were both lumped together as gringos, a term still used for Americans. Nowadays, most Chileans are much familiar with American culture than British culture, due to Hollywood and popular music.

From the United States of America (esp. the state of Utah), Mormons from the Church of Jesus Christ of Latter-day Saints introduced Mormonism into Chile and today, 700,000 (565,000 regular or active) members out of Chile's 18.5 million people are Mormon—4 percent of the population—and there's a temple in Chile while a second one was announced for Concepcion. See The Church of Jesus Christ of Latter-day Saints in Chile.

=== Contributions ===
Americo-Chileans played a role in international diplomacy between the two countries (see United States-Chile relations). The relationship turned tense during the Salvador Allende era (1970–73), in which the American CIA-backed bloody coup replaced him with general Augusto Pinochet to head a right-wing military regime (1973–89).

Also the American Chilean community were instrumental in reformation of the economy of Chile since the Chicago Boys experiment in American business schools from the late 1950s to early 1990s known as El Milagro Económico (the economic miracle) or Miracle of Chile.

Historically, some Chilean immigrants to the United States (see Chilean Americans) originated from the Central Valley of Chile from the San Antonio, Chile and Los Angeles, Chile areas, usually to California during the gold rush era (1846–54). Many Chileans prospered there and some were established enough to return home with their new wealth.

On August 16, 1906 a major earthquake struck Valparaíso with great devastation and thousands of deaths. Chilean doctor Carlos Van Buren, of American descent, was involved in medical care of earthquake victims. He later established a modern hospital Carlos Van Buren Hospital in 1912. American and European medical staffers improved medical care in Chile.

Military experts from the United States and Great Britain when the British Empire peaked in the turn of the 20th century, and pre-1914 Prussia (now Germany) developed and modernized the Chilean armed forces (the army, national police, navy and air force).

== Demography ==
Today, American culture is a dominant force in Chilean society, and an increase of North American tourists from the United States and Canada in the 1990s and 2000s attracted to the world-renowned scenery and increasing economic opportunity in Chile.

== Education ==
International School Nido de Águilas, an American school, is in Santiago.

== See also ==
- American diaspora
- Canadian diaspora
- Chilean Americans
- Chilean Canadians
