= Chilean Americans =

Americans of Chilean birth or descent

Chilean-American · Chileno-estadounidenses

Total population
- 172,062 (2018); 0.05% of the U.S. population (2018)

Regions with significant populations
- New York metropolitan area, Greater Boston, Philadelphia metropolitan area, Chicago metropolitan area, Milwaukee metropolitan area, Washington metropolitan area, Charlotte metropolitan area, Metro Atlanta, Miami metropolitan area, Louisville metropolitan area, Minneapolis–Saint Paul, Greater Houston, Dallas–Fort Worth metroplex, Denver metropolitan area, Seattle metropolitan area, Las Vegas Valley, San Francisco Bay Area, Greater Los Angeles

Languages
- Chilean Spanish, American English

Religion
- Evangelicalism, Roman Catholicism

Chilean Americans (Spanish: chileno-americanos, chileno-estadounidenses, norteamericanos de origen chileno or estadounidenses de origen chileno) are Americans who have full or partial origin from Chile.

According to the 2010 U.S. census, the population of Chilean ancestry was 126,810. Chilean Americans are the fourth smallest Hispanic group from South America, and the fifth smallest overall. Most Chileans migrating to the United States settle in metropolitan areas. Chilean Americans live mainly in the New York, Miami, Los Angeles, San Francisco and the Washington, D.C. metropolitan areas. There are significant communities found in Queens in New York City; Northern New Jersey; Miami, Florida; and Nassau County, New York. After the 1960s, Chileans began to immigrate more for economic or academic rather than political reasons, and that continues into the modern day.

== History ==
Chileans and other South Americans have been present in the state of California since the 1850s gold rush. Not all Chileans made it to the gold fields. Some remained in San Francisco, San Jose, Sacramento, and Stockton where they frequently worked as bricklayers, bakers, or seamen. Some with capital established themselves in various businesses, particularly the importation of flour and mining equipment from Chile. In the cities most tended to congregate and live in specific areas in the poorer sections of town. In the gold fields they lived in separate camp sites. In the summer of 1849 Chileans constituted the majority of the population of Sonora. Chileans frequently worked their mines as group efforts. When the placer gold ran out around Sonora the Chileans were amongst the first miners in California to extract gold from quartz. Historical remnants of those settlements influenced the names of locations such as Chileno Valley in Marin, Chili Gulch in Calaveras and Chili Bar in Placer which was named after Chilean road builders. Names of Chilean towns and places are often found in the names of streets in Northern California: Valparaiso, Santiago, and Calera.

After Allende was overthrown and a military regime was established in 1973, a large exodus of Chileans took place. Most fled to European countries, but a small group did emigrate to the United States. The U.S. government took these Chileans as refugees under a program for "political parolees."

Many of San Francisco's streets carry names of former residents of Chile: Atherton, Ellis, Lick, Larkin, and others. Chilean women also left their names: Mina and Clementina. Manuel Briseño, an early journalist in the mines was one of the founders of the San Diego Union. Juan Evangelista Reyes was a Sacramento pioneer as were the Luco brothers. Luis Felipe Ramírez was one of the City Fathers in Marysville. The Leiva family owned at one time, much of the land in Marin County, including Fort Ross. In 1975, Chilean exiles of the Augusto Pinochet dictatorship established La Peña Cultural Center in Berkeley, which is to this day the largest Chilean cultural center in the United States.

Chilean Americans have achieved many skills as entrepreneurs, judges, musicians, and others.

As of 2022, no Chilean American has yet been elected to the United States Congress.

== Motives of immigration ==
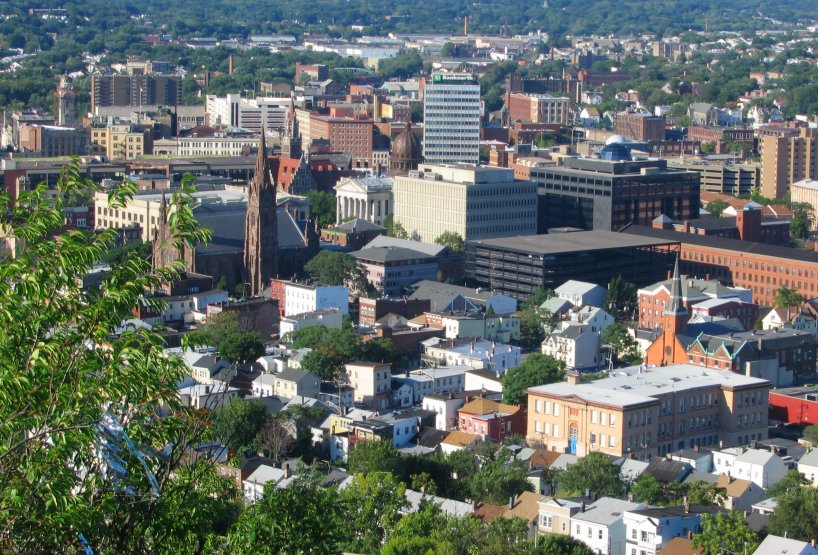
Paterson, New Jersey, within the New York City Metropolitan Area, is becoming an increasingly popular destination for Chilean immigrants to the United States since the 2010 Chile earthquake.

Most Chilean immigration to the U.S. has occurred largely since the 1990s. For the most part, Chileans left as either political asylees and refugees first during the presidency of the Marxist Salvador Allende or for economic reasons; the involvement of the United States in Salvador Allende's overthrow in 1973 and supporting the dictatorship of Augusto Pinochet, led to more political exiles fleeing from Chile to the U.S., as well as other countries.

Also, there have been others that have emigrated to seek higher education and career development opportunities. Since the 1960 Valdivia earthquake and with 2010 Chile earthquake, many Chileans have pursued economic opportunities in the United States, with Paterson, New Jersey, representing an increasingly common destination.

Many of the Pinochet-era immigrants were of middle or upper class origin. A significant proportion of them arrived with advanced educations and well-developed skills. They had contacts with other Chilean exiles and a sense of identity from their shared commitment to a democratic Chile. After a period of adjustment, many of them were able to pursue skilled jobs or professions. Unfortunately, others, who lacked skills or whose professional certifications were not recognized in the United States, were forced to take low-level jobs in which they were unable to use their skills. Some had been politically active students or union leaders in Chile who did not enter the United States with easily transferable skills.

The second major arrival into the United States was mainly for economic or academic opportunities. Yet, in general, acquiring a U.S. Visa requires the applicant to have a stable economic background, so most Chileans emigrating to the United States since 1990 have done so mostly for study purposes or to further their academic backgrounds.

== Identity ==
Chileans are mostly diverse, their ancestry can be fully Southern or Western European as well as mixed with Indigenous and other European heritage. They commonly identify themselves as both Latino and white. Some Chilean-owned stores and restaurants advertise as French and Italian. Many often prefer living in suburban areas near major cities in the U.S., and have a strong sense of family.

== Demographics ==
=== Population by state ===
The 10 U.S. states with the largest population of Chilean Americans are:

1. California – 24,006
2. Florida – 23,549
3. New York – 15,050
4. New Jersey – 8,100
5. Texas – 6,282
6. Virginia – 4,195
7. Maryland – 4,146
8. Utah – 3,364
9. Massachusetts – 3,045
10. Illinois – 2,753

=== Population by urban agglomeration ===
The largest populations of Chilean Americans are situated in the following urban areas:

1. New York-Northern New Jersey-Long Island, NY-NJ-PA MSA – 20,688
2. Miami-Fort Lauderdale-Pompano Beach, FL MSA – 17,161
3. Los Angeles-Long Beach-Santa Ana, CA MSA – 10,471
4. Washington-Arlington-Alexandria, DC-VA-MD-WV MSA – 6,963
5. San Francisco-Oakland-Fremont, CA MSA – 4,000
6. Boston-Cambridge-Quincy, MA-NH MSA – 2,622
7. Houston-Sugar Land-Baytown, TX MSA – 2,570
8. Chicago-Joliet-Naperville, IL-IN-WI MSA – 2,454
9. Riverside-San Bernardino-Ontario, CA MSA – 2,066
10. Orlando-Kissimmee-Sanford, FL MSA – 1,884
11. Atlanta-Sandy Springs-Marietta, GA MSA – 1,779
12. Seattle-Tacoma-Bellevue, WA MSA – 1,776
13. San Diego-Carlsbad-San Marcos, CA MSA – 1,730
14. Dallas-Fort Worth-Arlington, TX MSA – 1,686
15. Philadelphia-Camden-Wilmington, PA-NJ-DE-MD MSA – 1,505
16. Salt Lake City, UT MSA – 1,463
17. San Jose-Sunnyvale-Santa Clara, CA MSA – 1,397
18. Las Vegas-Paradise, NV MSA – 1,376
19. Tampa-St. Petersburg-Clearwater, FL MSA – 1,215
20. Phoenix-Mesa-Glendale, AZ MSA – 1,211

=== Population by city proper ===
1. New York City, New York – 7,026
2. Los Angeles, California – 4,112
3. Miami, Florida – 1,427
4. Houston, Texas – 934
5. San Diego, California and Chicago, Illinois – 876
6. San Francisco, California – 754
7. Miami Beach, Florida – 739
8. Washington, DC – 697
9. San Jose, California – 632
10. Doral, Florida – 622
11. Kendall, Florida – 613
12. Hialeah, Florida – 602
13. The Hammocks, Florida – 564
14. Pembroke Pines, Florida – 558
15. Fontainebleau, Florida – 549
16. Hollywood, Florida – 542
17. Kendale Lakes, Florida – 469
18. Las Vegas, Nevada – 467
19. Boston, Massachusetts – 405
20. San Antonio, Texas – 374
21. Union City, New Jersey – 372
22. Charlotte, North Carolina – 368
23. Philadelphia, Pennsylvania – 357
24. Coral Springs, Florida – 342
25. Miramar, Florida and Austin, Texas – 340

=== Population by percentage ===
U.S. communities with the highest percentages of Chileans as a percent of total population: (Source: Census 2010)

1. Brookeville, Maryland – 3.73%
2. Manorhaven, New York – 3.57%
3. Oyster Bay, New York – 2.67%
4. Warm Springs, Virginia – 1.63%
5. Dover, New Jersey – 1.55%
6. Key Biscayne, Florida – 1.50%
7. Sleepy Hollow, New York – 1.48%
8. Forest Home, New York – 1.40%
9. Doral, Florida – 1.36%
10. Victory Gardens, New Jersey – 1.32%
11. Wharton, New Jersey – 1.27%
12. The Crossings, Florida – 1.18%
13. The Hammocks, Florida – 1.11%
14. Inwood, New York – 1.10%
15. North Lynbrook, New York – 1.01%

Chileans are more than 1% of the entire population in only fifteen communities in the United States. These communities are mostly located in Miami-Dade County, Morris County, NJ, and Nassau County, NY.

== Traditions and customs ==
Most Chileans have customs that blend well into the American lifestyle. The Chilean workday is similar to the American workday, with the regular businessperson working 45 hours a week from 8:30 am to 6:30 pm with a lunch break, as well as possibly staying behind at work for a few hours to work overtime. However, many Chileans outside Santiago are used to going home for lunch, something not as common in the U.S. and with Chilean Americans.

Unlike the "normal" American diet, Chileans are used to having four meals a day. Breakfast, lunch, tea (or onces) at about five o'clock, and a late dinner. Many people actually have onces during the early evening hours and skip dinner. Surprisingly, Chile is one of the only Latin countries where tea is a more popular drink than coffee, differing from American consumption trends as well.

== Notable people ==
- Los Abandoned, Chilean American rock band
- Marjorie Agosín, Poet, essayist, fiction writer, activist, and professor
- Fernando Alegria, Stanford professor
- Marsia Alexander-Clarke, American video installation artist
- Isabel Allende, Chilean writer
- Fernando Alvarez, Jockey
- Cayetano Apablasa, land owner and politician in Los Angeles, California.
- Tom Araya, Musician
- Claudio Arrau, Pianist
- Felipe Bazar, U.S. Navy hero
- Natascha Bessez, Singer and beauty pageant
- Nico Bodonczy, Soccer player
- Daniel Borzutzky, Poet and translator
- Santiago Cabrera, actor
- Nico Carvacho (born 1997) – basketball player in the Israeli Basketball Premier League
- Charissa Chamorro, Actress
- Charmaine, Musician
- Beto Cuevas, Singer
- Angélica Castro, Former model, actress and TV presenter
- Patricia Demick, Boxer
- Cristián de la Fuente, actor
- Cote de Pablo, actress
- Don Francisco, television host
- Ruperto Donoso, Jockey
- Ariel Dorfman, Educator, activist, and author
- Juan Downey, Artist
- Frank J. Duarte, laser physicist and author
- Matias Duarte, Inventor
- Sebastian Edwards, Academic and economist
- Paloma Elsesser, Plus-size fashion model
- Julio M. Fernandez, Biologist
- Pablo Francisco, Comedian
- Alberto Fuguet, Writer and film director
- Thelma Furness, Viscountess Furness, Mistress of King Edward VIII
- Jorge Garcia, Actor
- John Gavin, Actor
- Alexa Guarachi, tennis player
- Lisa Guerrero, Sportscaster and actress
- Tommy Guerrero, Skateboarder, company owner, and musician
- Claudio Guzmán, Television director, producer, art director, and production designer.
- Sophia Hayden, Architect and the first woman graduate of Massachusetts Institute of Technology
- Fareed Haque, Fusion guitarist
- Lorenza Izzo, Actress
- Alfredo Jaar, Artist, architect, and filmmaker
- Nicolas Jaar, Composer and recording artist
- Alain Johannes, Musician
- Paulina Kernberg, Child psychiatrist and professor
- Juan Pablo Letelier, member of the Chilean Senate, son of Orlando Letelier
- Jason Liebrecht, Voice actor
- Gonzalo Lira, commentator, novelist and filmmaker
- Vicente Luque, MMA fighter
- Antonio Macia, Screenwriter and actor
- Paloma Mami, Singer
- Benny Mardones, Singer
- Roberto Matta, Surreal painter
- Gordon Matta-Clark, Artist
- Claudio Miranda, Novelist and filmmaker
- Gabriela Mistral, poet
- Daniella Monet, Actress
- Harry Hays Morgan Jr., Diplomat, society figure, and actor
- Gloria Naveillán, politician
- Ricardo A. Olea, Engineer and scientist
- America Olivo, Actress, singer, and model
- Pedro Pascal, actor
- Lux Pascal, actress and activist
- Nicole Polizzi, Reality TV personality
- Promis, Musician
- Jose Quiroga, Cardiologist
- Horatio Sanz, Comedian, Saturday Night Live
- Elizabeth Schall, Musician
- Sebastian Soto, Soccer player
- Elizabeth Subercaseaux, Writer
- Mahani Teave, Classical pianist and conservationist, born in Hawaii to a Rapanui father and an American mother
- Jonathan Tetelman, operatic tenor
- Ryann Torrero, Soccer player and model
- Steve Thurston, Journalist, entrepreneur, and co-founder, CEO and president of Integrity Ministries
- Mercedes Valdivieso, Chilean writer and Rice University professor
- Arturo Valenzuela, Professor
- Francisca Valenzuela, Chilean poet and musician
- Mikey Varas, soccer coach
- Leonor Varela, actress and model
- Andres Velasco, Economist and professor
- Alexander Witt, Director
- Marko Zaror, actor and martial artist

== Chileans abroad ==
Of the 857,781 Chilean expatriates around the globe, 13.3% (114,084) live in the United States, 50.1% reside in Argentina, 4.9% in Sweden, and around 2% each in Canada and Australia, with the remaining 18% being scattered in smaller numbers across the globe, particularly the countries of the European Union.

== See also ==
- Demographics of Chile
- Latino conservatism in the United States
- Chileans in the United Kingdom
- Chilean Australian
- List of Chileans
- Chile–United States relations
