= Chile–China relations =

- Chile: China

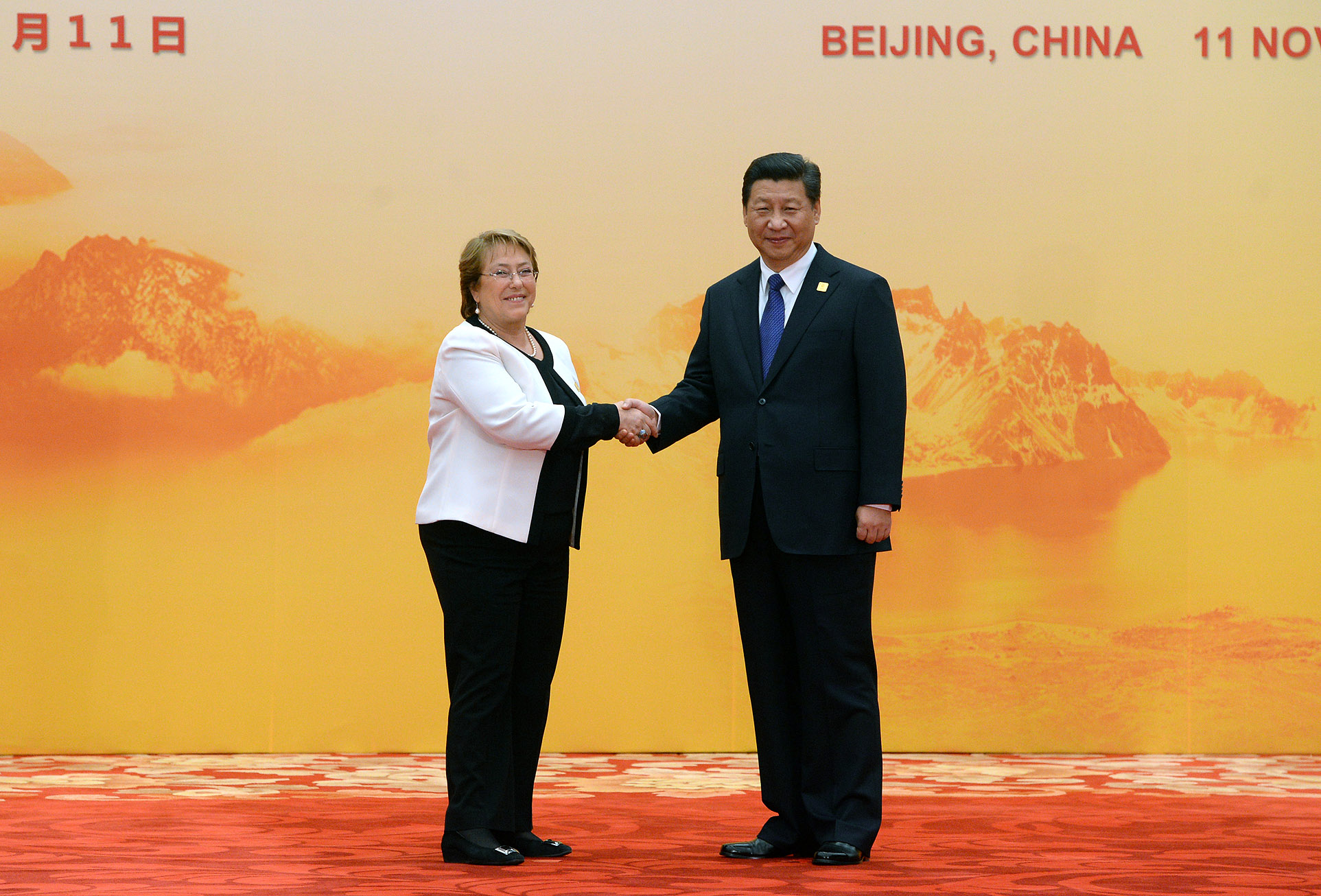
Chilean president Michelle Bachelet and Chinese leader Xi Jinping in Beijing.

The Republic of Chile and the People's Republic of China (PRC) established formal diplomatic relations in 1970. Previously, Chile had recognized the Republic of China since 1915. Both nations are members of the Asia-Pacific Economic Cooperation and the United Nations.

== History ==
Relations between the People's Republic of China and Chile were established on 15 December 1970, shortly following the election of Salvador Allende, and Chile became the first South American country to recognize the mainland Chinese government. Following the 1973 Chilean coup d'état which saw the overthrow of the Allende government, China was one of only two Communist countries (the other was Romania) not to have severed ties with Augusto Pinochet's new regime, due to the latter's continued endorsement of the One China Policy. As a result, China chose not to recall its ambassador in Chile, while replacing the Allende appointed ambassador Armando Uribe with a Pinochet appointed one. China also chose to represent the affairs of Chile in the Democratic People's Republic of Korea (DPRK aka North Korea) and the affairs of the DPRK in Chile.

The continued relationship was built on pragmatism and non-interference. China supported Chile's claim of sovereignty over Antarctic, and in turn, Chile allowed the Chinese to build the Great Wall research station inside Chile's territorial claims. There was also a failed attempt at a joint venture to produce weapons between Norinco and FAMAE, aimed at reducing Chile's military dependence on the United States. Pinochet has nurtured his relationship with China. Pinochet visited China in 1993 and 1997. Despite his vehement anti-communism, Pinochet has praised China's system of government, saying that "I saw that Chinese Communism was patriotic Communism, not the Communism of Mao. I opened up the doors to Chinese commerce, letting them hold an exposition here, in which they brought everything they had—and they sold everything they brought".

Following the end of the Cold War and the Chilean transition to democracy in 1990, bilateral relations continued, with the new Chilean government pursuing a policy of free trade, and supported China's 2001 entrance into the World Trade Organization.

== Bilateral relations ==
Chile is one of the first Latin American countries which began trade and economic exchanges with China after the Chinese civil war. Bilateral trade between the two countries began as early as 1961 when China established the Commercial News Office of Chinese Import and Export Corporation. In 1965, it was re-established as the Commercial Office of China Council for the Promotion of International Trade.

Since the establishment of the diplomatic relations in 1970, bilateral economic relations have developed considerably. Chile became China's third largest Latin American trading partner behind Brazil and Mexico. Bilateral trade volume was at $2.565 billion in 2002.

Chile and China signed a free trade agreement in 2008.

Chile joined the Belt and Road Initiative (BRI) in 2018.

In 2018, Chinese company purchased controlling stake in Sociedad Química y Minera (SQM), SQM being at the time is Chile lithium producer and world's biggest lithium producer. As of 2025, Chinese investment in Chile is primarily in the resources sector and predominantly mining-related. In 2026 Tianqi Lithium lost in Chileans courts a challenge to the dismembering of SQM's lithium operation in Salar de Atacama into the new public-private joint venture Nova Andino Litio.

In February 2026, Chile denied the Chinese ship Silk Road Ark permission to provide medical services to Chilean residents on board.

Countries which signed cooperation documents related to the Belt and Road Initiative.

In January 2026, plans for a China–Chile submarine optical fiber cable built by China Mobile were scrapped during the last days of the Gabriel Boric government following sanctions by the United States against a handful of Chilean officials.

In March 2026, José Antonio Kast's government signed an agreement with the United States with regards to the exploitation and commercialization of rare-earth metals. This move has been interpreted by analysts an attempt by the United States to diminish Chinese influence in the rare-earth metals market.

In November 2026, Chilean president José Antonio Kast visited Shenzhen to attend APEC China 2026. During the visit, he met with Chinese leader Xi Jinping, and told him relations had "remained stable, beyond internal situations that may have affected our country" and praised China for lifting people out of poverty, while adding Chile respects "the political organisations of each nation".

=== Cerro Ventarrones observatory ===
In 2023, the Catholic University of the North and the National Astronomical Observatories of China signed an agreement to develop an astronomical observatory in Cerro Ventarrones, Antofagasta Region. In April 2025, the Chilean government froze development of the project. The government's action followed reporting on the lack of transparency around it and potential military intelligence uses by the People's Liberation Army.

== High-level visits ==
Chilean President José Antonio Kast and Chinese President Xi Jinping at the APEC summit in Shenzhen, China; November 2026.

Presidential visits from Chile to China

- President Patricio Aylwin (1992)
- President Eduardo Frei Ruiz-Tagle (1995)
- President Ricardo Lagos (2001)
- President Sebastián Piñera (2010, 2019)
- President Michelle Bachelet (2014, 2017)
- President Gabriel Boric (2025)
- President José Antonio Kast (2026)

CCP General Secretary, President and Premier visits from China to Chile

- President Yang Shangkun (1990)
- President Jiang Zemin (2001)
- Premier Wen Jiabao (2012)
- President Hu Jintao (2004)
- President Xi Jinping (2016)

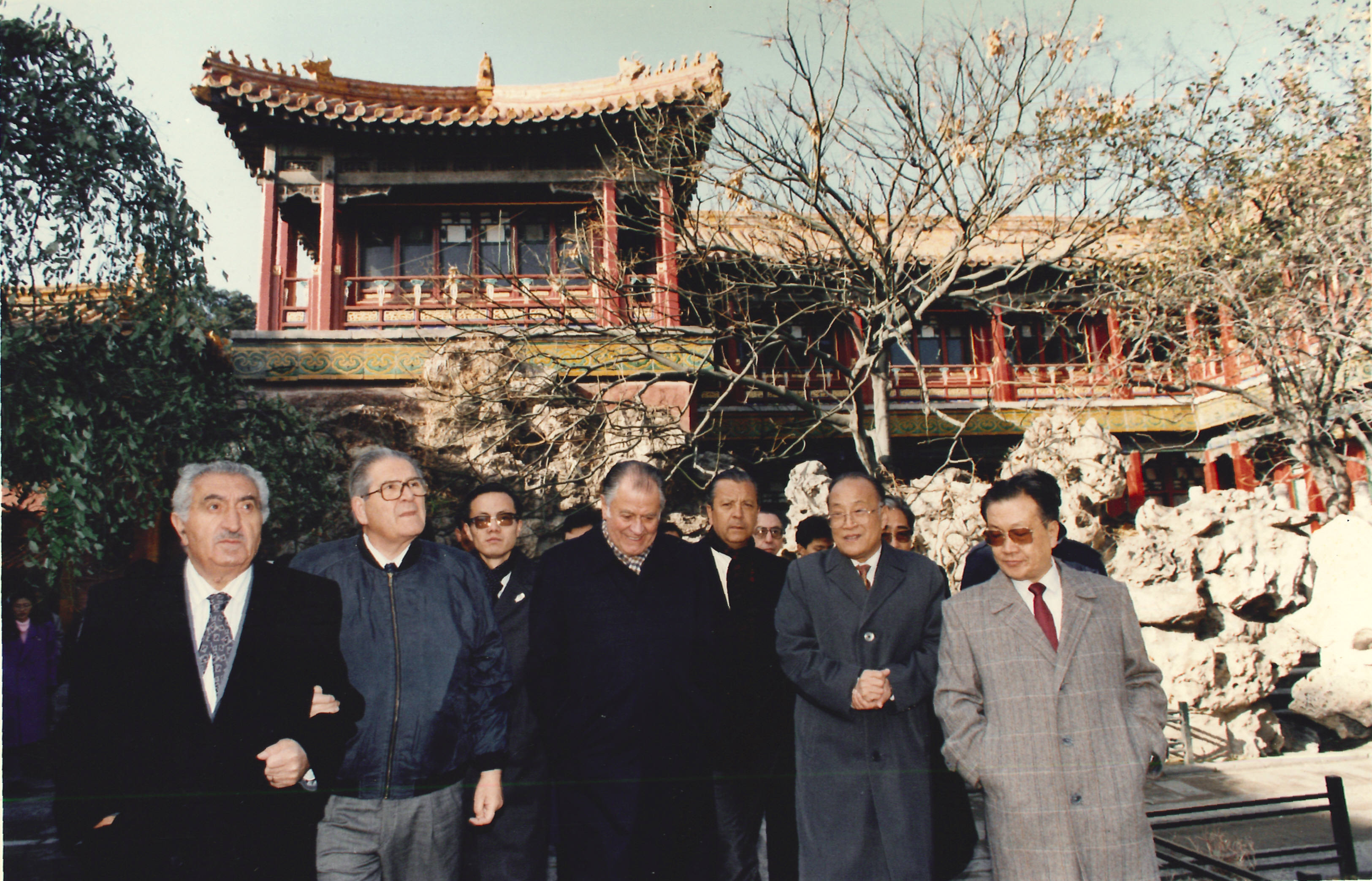
President Patricio Aylwin in China; 1992.

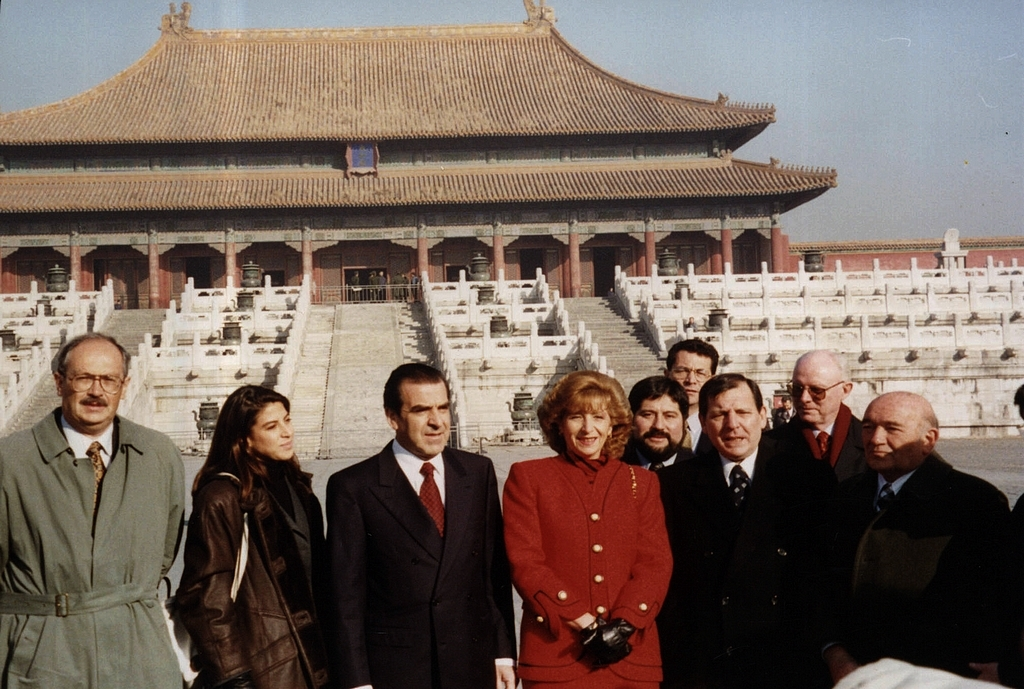
President Eduardo Frei Ruiz-Tagle in Beijing; 1995.

President Sebastián Piñera at the Great Wall of China; 2010.

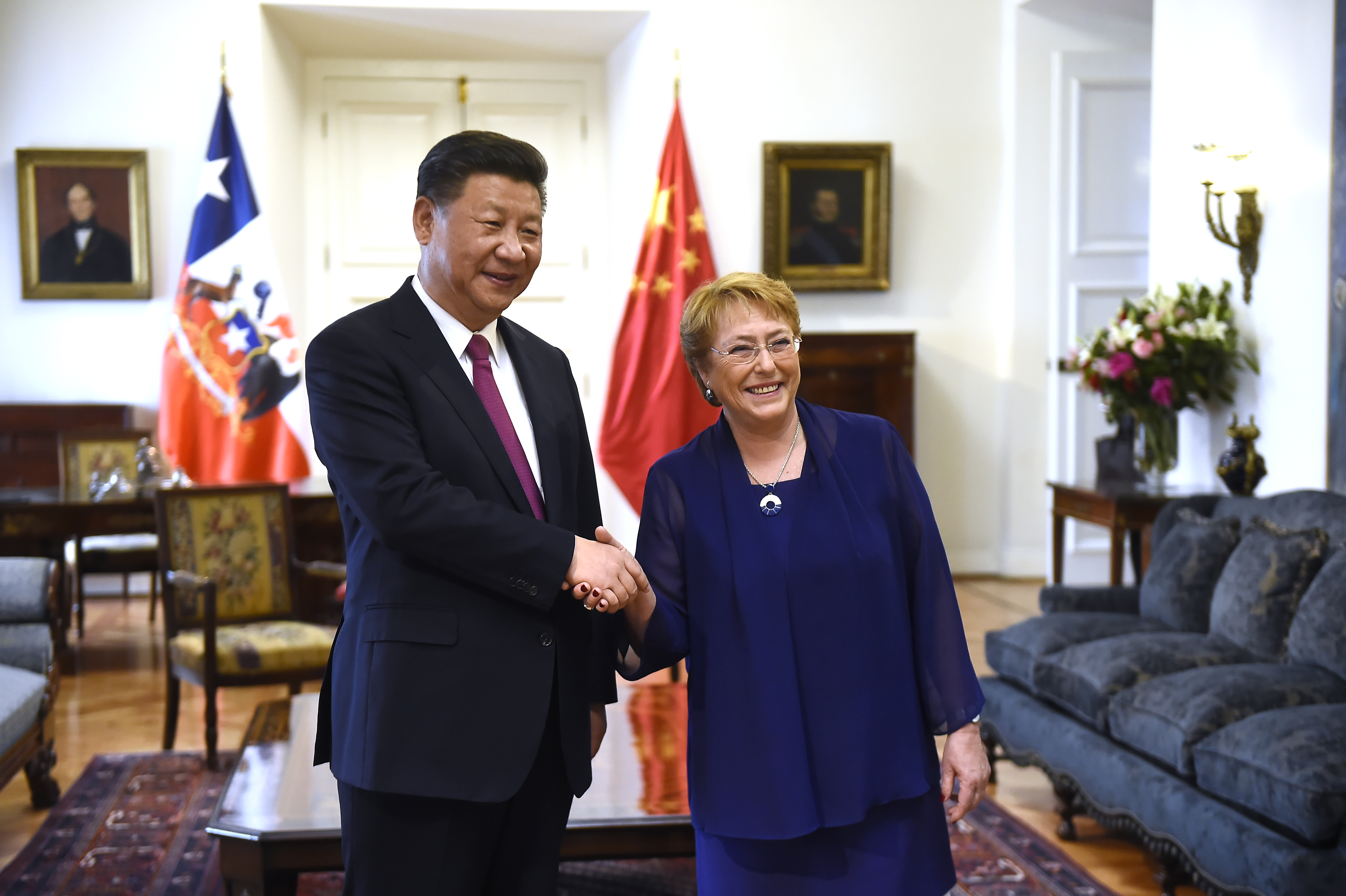
President Xi Jinping and President Michelle Bachelet in Santiago; 2016.

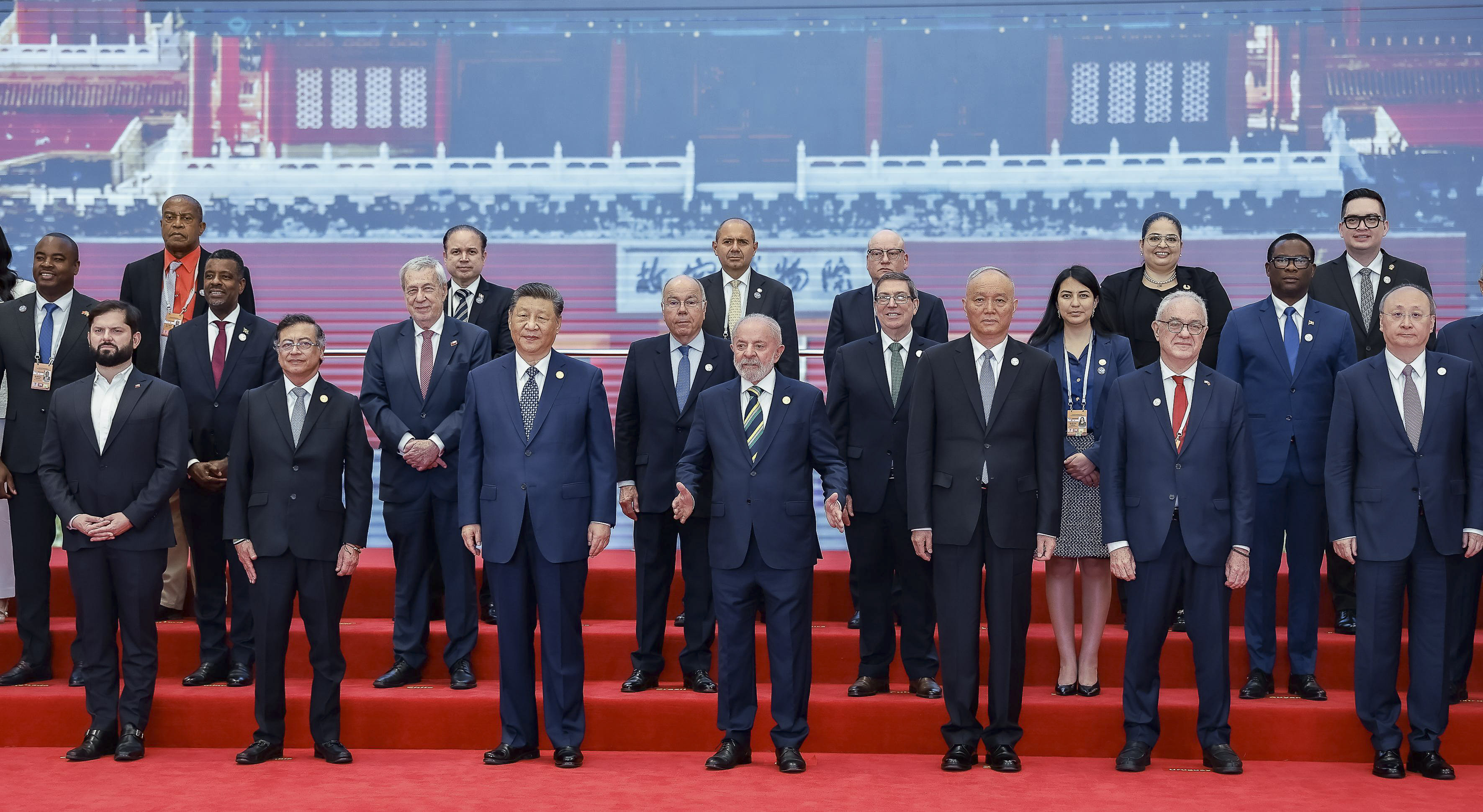
President Gabriel Boric and President Xi Jinping during the CELAC-China summit in Beijing; May 2025.

== Trade ==
As of 2025, trade between the two countries was approximately USD 65 billion annually. As of 2025, 37% of Chile's exports are bought by China.

Chinese exports to Chile is primary in textiles, clothing, ceramics, chemicals and medicine, tools and consumer electronics.

Chilean exports to China are mainly in copper, niter, pulp, paper, fish meal and timber. This has also expanded to red wine, marine alga, potassium sulphate and fruit produce.

== Public opinion ==
A survey published in 2026 by the Pew Research Center found that 49% of Chileans had a favorable view of China, while 36% had an unfavorable view.

== Resident diplomatic missions ==
of Chile in China

- Beijing (Embassy)
- Chengdu (Consulate-General)
- Guangzhou (Consulate-General)
- Hong Kong (Consulate-General)
- Shanghai (Consulate-General)

of China in Chile

- Santiago (Embassy)

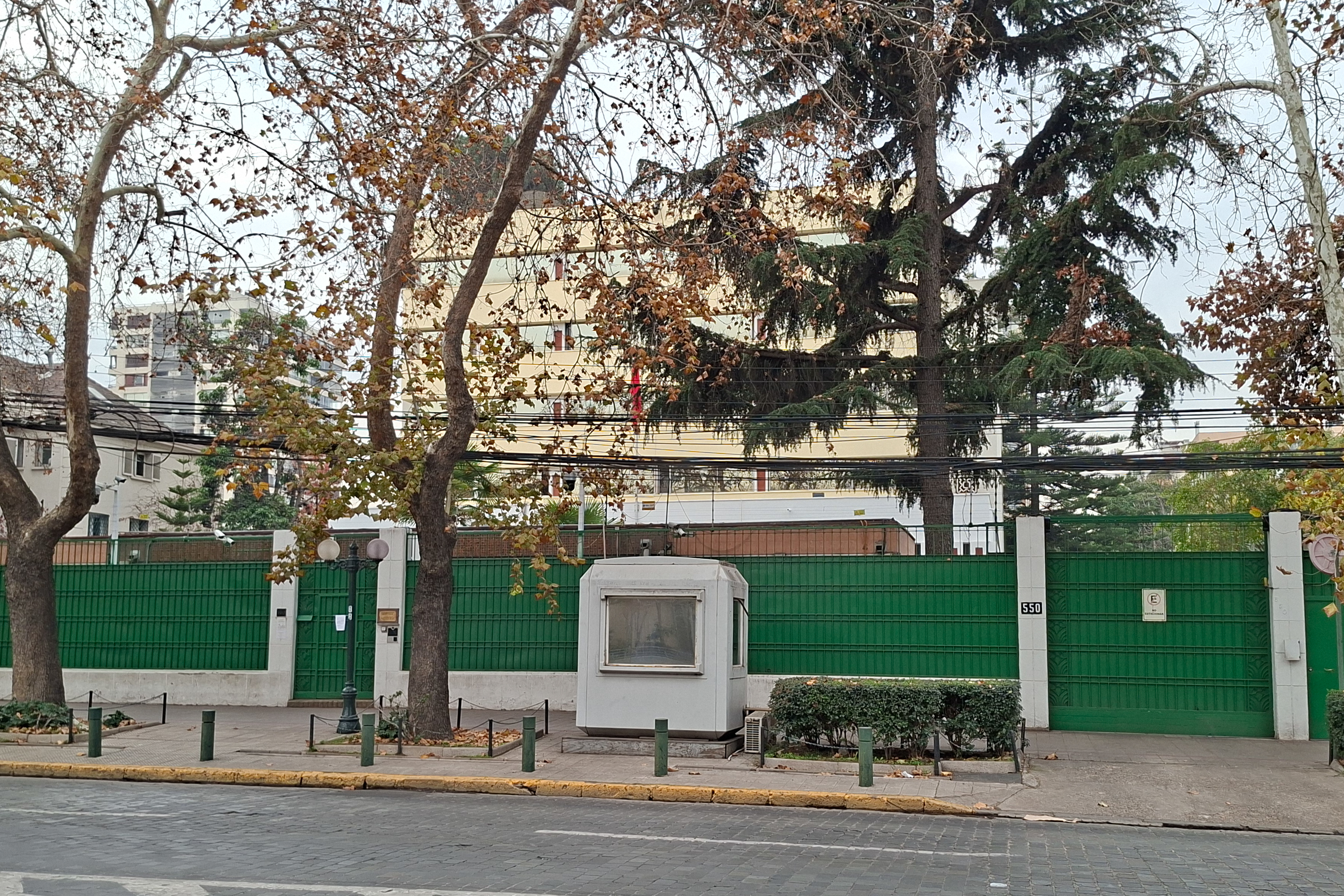
Embassy of China in Santiago

== See also ==
- Foreign relations
- Foreign policy
