= Chile–United States relations =

- Chile: United States

Diplomatic mission
- Embassy of Chile, Washington, D.C.: Embassy of the United States, Santiago

Envoy
- Chilean Ambassador to the United States Juan Gabriel Valdés: American Ambassador to Chile Brandon Judd

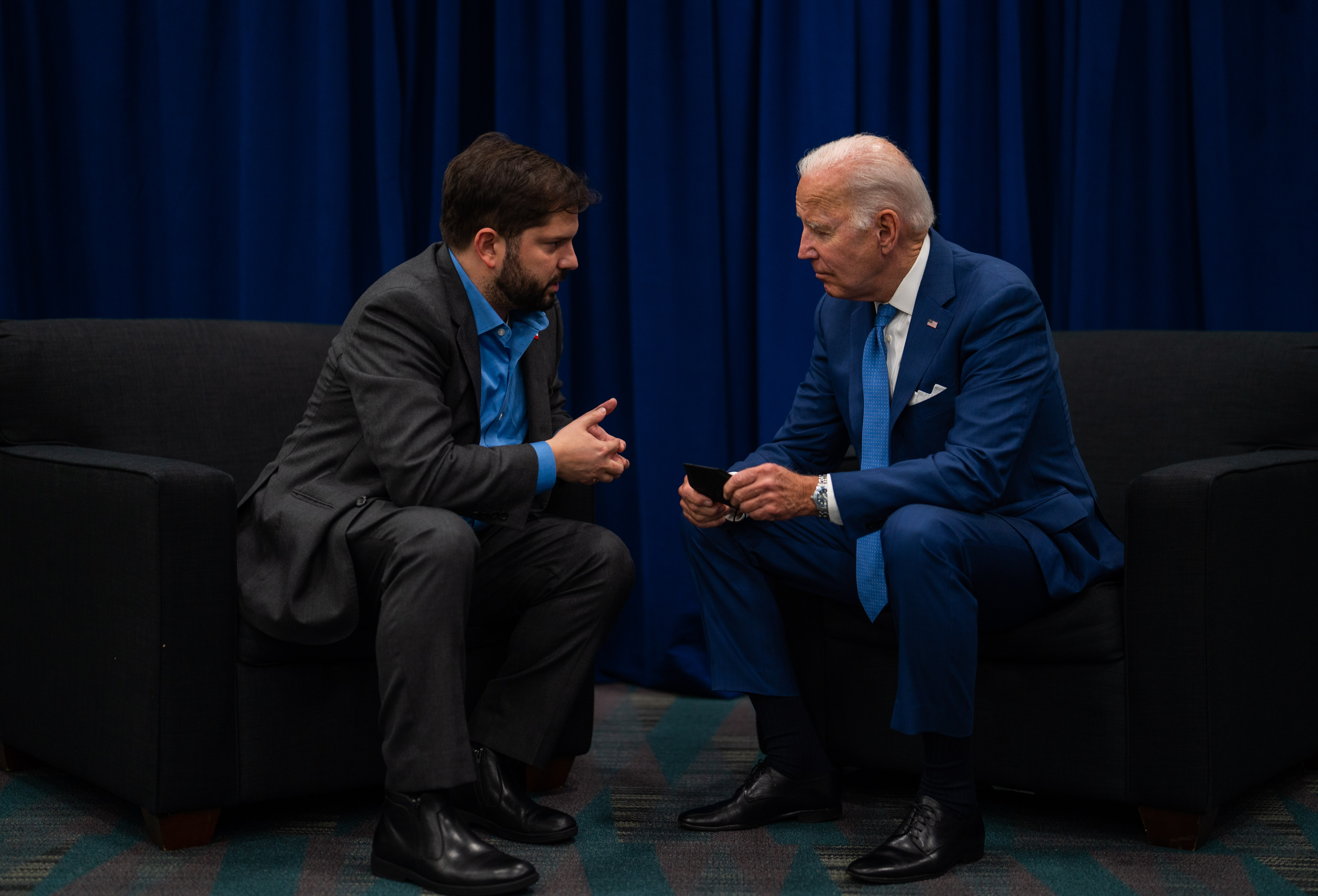
Chilean President Gabriel Boric with U.S. president Joe Biden at the Summit of the Americas in Los Angeles; June 2022.

The relationship between Chile and the United States, which dates back to the 19th century, has improved significantly since 1988 and is better than at any other time in history. In the late 1980s and early 1990s, the US government applauded the rebirth of democratic practices in Chile, despite having supported the 1973 coup d'état and subsequent military regime.

Regarded as one of the least corrupt and most vibrant democracies in South America, with a healthy economy, Chile is noted as being one of the closest strategic allies of the United States in the Southern Hemisphere, along with Colombia, and remains part of the Inter-American Treaty of Reciprocal Assistance. A prime example of cooperation includes the landmark 2003 Chile–United States Free Trade Agreement. Chile is also the first South American nation to gain membership in the Organisation for Economic Co-operation and Development with the United States, as well as the only Latin American country to be included in the U.S. Visa Waiver Program.

The governments consult frequently on issues including multilateral diplomacy, security, culture and science. Recently the governments have signed agreements on education and green energy.

== History ==
A colony of Spain, Chile previously had been an audiencia of the Viceroyalty of Peru. Napoleon's French armies invaded Spain in 1808 and imposed a new ruler. The invasion sparked revolutionary movements in Spain's American colonies. Chilean revolutionaries declared Chile's independence on September 18, 1810. Several years of fighting followed, but by 1822 U.S. James Monroe concluded that Spain was unable to recover its colonies. He decided on recognition and asked Congress for funds for Ministers Plenipotentiary for Chile, La Plata (Argentina), Colombia, Peru, and Mexico. Spain protested, but Congress provided the funding in mid-1822. In 1823, Monroe named Heman Allen of Vermont as Minister Plenipotentiary and Envoy Extraordinary to Chile.

After 1864 a series of small issues worsened relations. Chilean businessmen preferred working with British merchants.

=== War of the Pacific 1879–1884 ===
Washington favored Peru during Chile's War of the Pacific with Peru and Bolivia 1879 until 1884. It tried to bring an early end to the long-lasting war mainly because of US business and financial interests in Peru. Moreover, Washington worried that British merchants would take economic control of the region through Chile. Peace negotiations failed when a stipulation required Chile to return the conquered lands. Chileans suspected the new US initiative was tainted with a pro-Peruvian bias. As a result, relations between Chile and the United States took a turn for the worse.

Chile instead asked that the United States remain neutral. The United States Pacific Squadron only contained a few wooden vessels, and Chile had two new armored warships. The U.S. knew they were unable to match Chilean naval power and backed down.

=== Baltimore incident 1891 ===
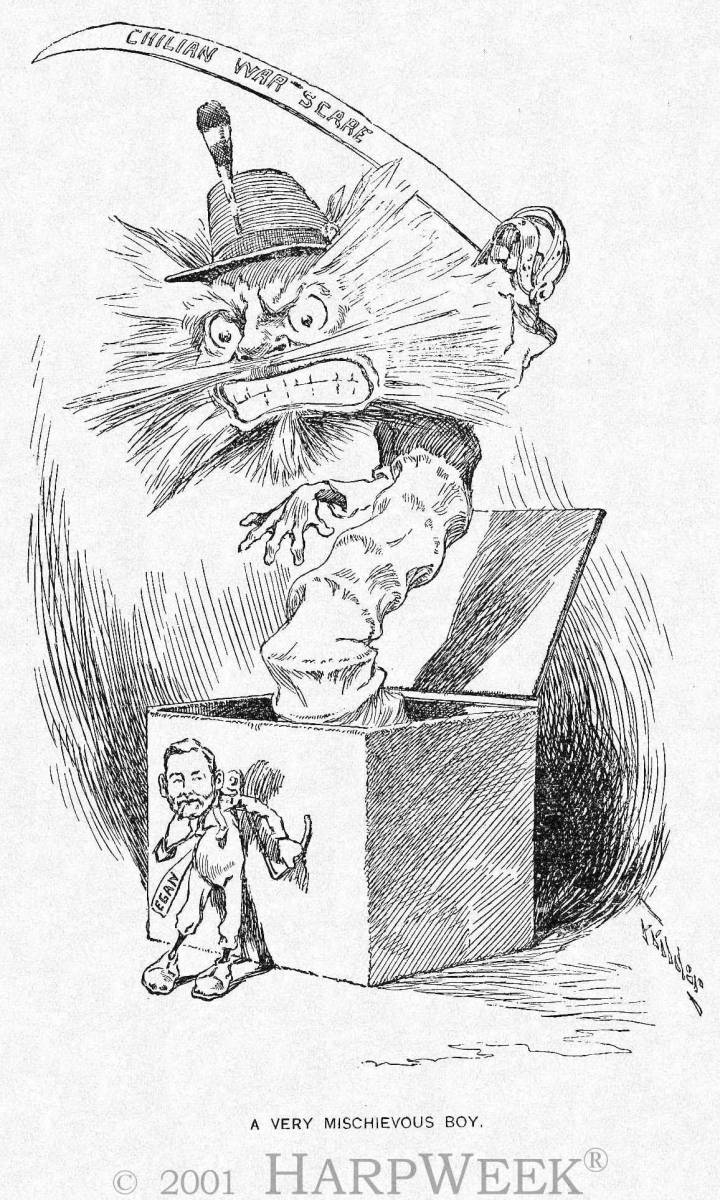
"A very mischievous Boy" Caricature of U.S. Minister Patrick Egan, whose reckless diplomacy almost set off a war with Chile (Harper's Weekly, November 14, 1891).

In 1891 Washington favored the losing side in a civil war. It blocked the transfer of arms purchased illegally in California by the rebels in the Itata incident. The US minister harbored dozens of leaders of the losing faction in the embassy; they eventually left on American ships. To protect American interests during the civil war President Benjamin Harrison and his aggressive Navy Secretary Benjamin F. Tracy sent a warship, the "USS Baltimore"; unwisely the captain allowed shore leave for his men in the hostile port of Valparaiso. Trouble escalated into a street brawl, with two Americans dead, 17 injured and 36 in jail. This led to the major "Baltimore crisis" between the two nations, with loose talk of possible war. Chile at first denied responsibility, and the foreign minister attacked the U.S. Harrison demanded full satisfaction as a point of honor and demanded $75,000 in reparations. European powers favored Chile; they recognized American dominance in the region and did not intervene. Argentina, and Peru, and to a lesser extent Brazil, had their own grievances against Chile and supported the U.S. Chile capitulated to Washington's terms and afterward built up its navy and its European connections.

=== Cold war relations ===
In the post-war period, the US increasingly saw Chile as a strategically important ally in Latin America. Under President Kennedy, the 1961 Alliance for Progress promoted economic development in Chile. Chile was one of the main recipients of this US aid. From 1962 to 1969, the country received economic aid from the US to promote infrastructure, education, and agricultural reforms. An important motive for this was to contain the Chilean left, which was demanding the nationalization of Chile's copper deposits under US control, which overshadowed relations from the 1960s onwards.

The US attempted to establish the Christian Democratic Party (PDC) as a bulwark against the shift to the left. In 1964, Eduardo Frei Montalva received US support for his election campaign to secure his election as president. Frei's government pursued a moderate policies: it implemented initial land reforms and negotiated a compromise on the partial “Chileanization” of copper. In 1967, Kennecott sold a 51% stake in the El Teniente mine to the Chilean state. The growing socialist camp around Salvador Allende, on the other hand, worried Washington. US companies feared the nationalization of their assets in the country. In 1970, Richard Nixon set up a secret operation to prevent Allende's election, and the CIA was instructed to sabotage his campaign. At the same time, the Nixon administration openly said that an Allende government was not desired. In the weeks leading up to the elections, the US covertly financed opposition parties and strikes (e.g., truck drivers' strikes). However, all of this was unsuccessful: Allende won a narrow victory in the elections in October 1970 and was ultimately confirmed as president.

==== 1973 coup ====
The inauguration was followed by a prolonged period of social and political unrest between the right-wing dominated Congress of Chile and Allende, as well as an economic war led by Washington to destabilize the Allende government. US President Richard Nixon had promised to “make the economy scream” in order to prevent Allende from taking power or to overthrow him. As early as 1970, Chilean General René Schneider was killed in a CIA-backed coup attempt by right-wing forces. On September 11, 1973, the Chilean military finally staged a successful coup against President Allende, who took his own life in the presidential palace. High-ranking US officials had followed the coup with prior knowledge, and files from that period prove that US government agencies supported the circles around the coup leader Pinochet. In a conversation published later, security advisor Henry Kissinger remarked, “We didn't do it. I mean we helped them.” After the coup, General Pinochet established a brutal military dictatorship. Thousands of opponents of the regime were killed or “disappeared,” tens of thousands were tortured or imprisoned, with the approval or even support of the US. Chile became a staunch pillar of the US-backed anti-communist alliance in Latin America. Pinochet's regime joined the so-called “Operation Condor,” a secret intelligence network of anti-communist dictatorships in South America that, with Washington's approval, systematically persecuted and murdered opponents across borders in the 1970s and 1980s.

==== Economic reforms and human rights ====
Economically, the military government opened Chile to the free market. The so-called Chicago Boys, a group of Chilean economists trained at the University of Chicago, implemented radical reforms. They closed state-owned enterprises, weakened trade unions, and introduced a privately financed pension system. These reforms began after a meeting between US economist Milton Friedman and Pinochet in 1975. The Chilean economy thus served as a testing ground for later neoliberal reforms by the Reagan administration in the US. Under the principle of realpolitik introduced by Kissinger, the US under Richard Nixon and later Gerald Ford openly supported the Chilean military dictatorship. In 1976, however, under the influence of Senator Ted Kennedy, the US Congress banned arms sales to Chile. During the term of Jimmy Carter from 1977 to 1981, who denounced human rights violations in Chile, Washington changed its course. However, Carter was not prepared to completely abandon his anti-communist allies, even after an investigation in 1978 established his responsibility for the assassination of dissident Orlando Letelier (killed by a car bomb in Washington, D.C., in 1976), in which the advice of his security advisor Zbigniew Brzeziński played a role. Carter's successor, Ronald Reagan, initially brought the US closer to the Pinochet regime again, but during his second term, under public pressure, he began to call on Pinochet to pave the way for a new beginning in the country, as the brutality of his regime was becoming an increasing burden on the credibility of the US.

=== After democratization in Chile ===
With the end of Pinochet's rule (referendum in 1988, resignation in 1990), relations improved again. The US quickly recognized Chile's democratic government under President Patricio Aylwin and from now on liked to refer to Chile as a reliable partner. Economic integration increased: in 2003, both countries signed a bilateral free trade agreement. This came into force in 2004 and within a few years abolished most tariffs on industrial products and (gradually) on agricultural goods, enabling Chile to become one of the US's most important trading partners in Latin America.

In February 2014, the U.S. government officially announced that it had added Chile to the Visa Waiver Program, enabling all Chilean citizens to travel the United States without payment of a fee beginning in May and making Chile the only nation in Latin America to possess such a privilege, one usually afforded to only the closest allies and partners of the U.S., such as countries of Europe, Australia, New Zealand, Japan, South Korea and Taiwan.

In April 2026, Chile and the United States signed a security agreement under which the U.S. will invest US$1 million to strengthen Chile's capacity to combat organized crime. They also signed a mining memorandum of understanding establishing a framework for cooperation to boost investment in critical minerals, facilitate the exchange of knowledge and technology, and promote mineral exploration and processing to increase their market value.

==== Chilean copper export to the United States ====
Trump ordered a probe into copper imports in preparation for a Section 232 tariff on the industry on February 25, 2025. In anticipation, metal and mining companies doubled their copper imports. On July 9, Trump announced a 50% tariff on copper imports would take effect on August 1.

The US consumes around 1.6 million tons of refined copper annually but produces only 1.1 million tons. As of the announcement, no plan had been unveiled to boost domestic production to compensate for the expected shortfall. The tariffs are anticipated to increase the prices of US products containing copper components. Copper producers with major operations in the US include Freeport-McMoRan and Rio Tinto. Rio Tinto, Southwire, and Trafigura proposed restricting copper scrap exports instead of penalizing imports, but scrap exporters lobbied against the idea.

Chile supplies about 60% of US copper imports, accounting for 11.1% of Chilean copper exports. Chilean state-owned miner Codelco, which sends roughly one-third of its copper exports to the US, was at first expected to lose significant revenue. In Chile, the proposed negative effects include reduced employment or fewer new job opportunities, diminished foreign investment in copper mining, and lower government revenues that could widen the fiscal deficit. A potential upside, however, is a possible increase in global copper prices due to constrained supply.

Analysts suggest that China, India, and Southeast Asian countries could absorb much of the displaced copper, keeping the global supply-demand balance relatively stable through at least 2030, when new copper mines are expected to come online.

On July 30, Trump announced that the tariffs would not apply to cathode copper. Considering that the sale of cathode copper to buyers in the US represent 11.1% of the value of Chilean copper exports this exception improved the outlook for Chilean mining. This had a particularly good impact for Codelco that is a traditional supplier of cathode copper.

=== Second Donald Trump administration (2025–present) ===
In September 2026, Chile joined the Shield of the Americas, the regional alliance promoted by U.S. President Donald Trump.

== U.S. Embassy ==
In addition to working closely with Chilean government officials to strengthen their bilateral relationship, the U.S. Embassy in Santiago provides a range of services to U.S. citizens and businesses in Chile (see the embassy's home page for details of these services.) The embassy also is the focus for a number of American community activities in the Santiago area.

The public affairs section cooperates with universities and non-governmental organizations on programs, including U.S. Speaker, International Visitor, and Fulbright programs. Themes of include trade, international security, democratic governance in the region, judicial reform, law enforcement, environmental issues, and the teaching of English. The public affairs section works daily with Chilean media. It also assists visiting foreign media, including U.S. journalists, and is regularly involved in press events for high-level visitors.

Attachés at the embassy from the Foreign Commercial Service, Foreign Agricultural Service, and the Animal and Plant Health Inspection Service work closely with the hundreds of U.S. companies who export to or maintain offices in Chile. These officers provide information on Chilean trade and industry regulations and administer several programs intended to support U.S. companies in Chile.

The Consular Section of the embassy provides services to U.S. citizens residing in Chile, currently of 19,000 people. It assists Americans voting in U.S. elections while abroad, provides U.S. tax information, and facilitates government benefit and social security payments. About 170,000 U.S. citizens visit Chile each year. The Consular Section offers passport and emergency services to U.S. tourists during their stay in Chile. It also issues about 40,000 visitor visas a year to Chilean citizens who travel to the United States.

== Public opinion ==
72% of Chileans viewed the U.S. favorably in 2015, and 62% of Chileans viewing American influence positively in 2013, the highest rating for any surveyed country in Latin America. According to the 2012 U.S. Global Leadership Report, 42% of Chileans approve of U.S. leadership, with 25% disapproving and 32% uncertain. According to a 2026 Pew Research Center survey, 37% of Chileans had a favorable view of the United States, while 53% had a negative view.

== Resident diplomatic missions ==
- Chile has an embassy in Washington, D.C., and consulates-general in Chicago, Houston, Los Angeles, Miami, New York City and San Francisco.
- United States has an embassy in Santiago.
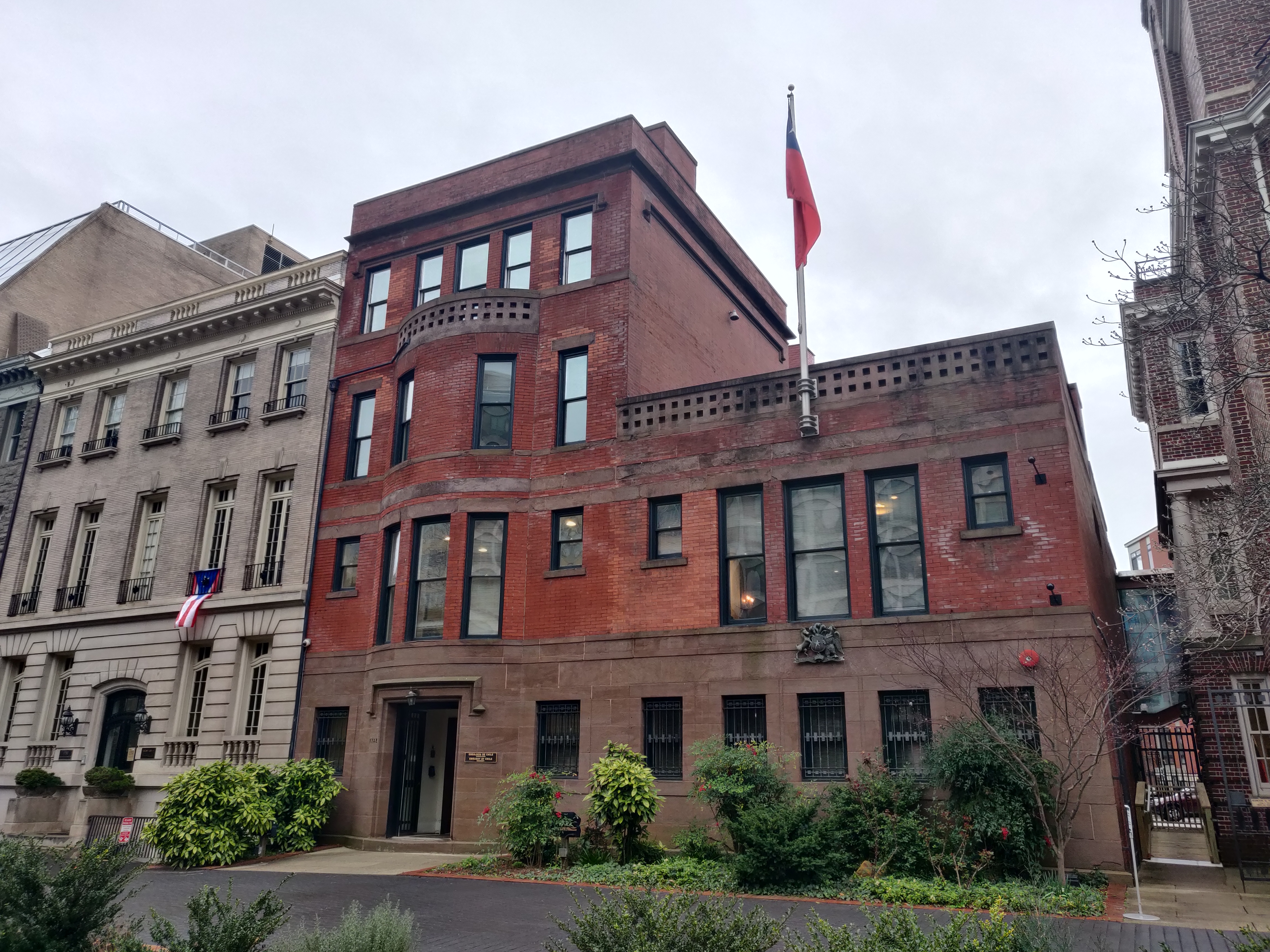
Embassy of Chile in Washington, D.C.

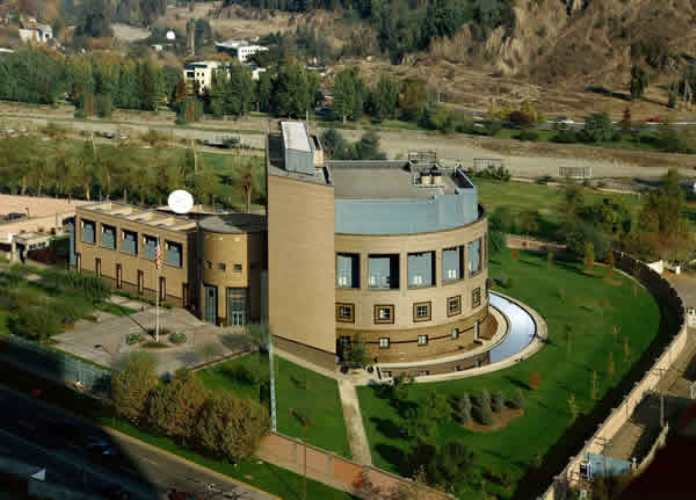
Embassy of the United States in Santiago

== See also ==
- Americans in Chile
- Chilean Americans
- Letelier case
- United States intervention in Chile
