= Julio M. Fernandez =

Julio M. Fernandez is professor at the Department of Biological Sciences Columbia University.

Fernandez studied physics in Chile, then did his PhD at the University of California, Los Angeles. He did post-doctorate work in Los Angeles and Germany. In 1987 he became professor at the Department of Physiology, University of Pennsylvania, Philadelphia. Then, he moved to Rochester, Minnesota to the Department of Physiology and Biophysics, Mayo Foundation. Since 2002 he is professor at the Department of Biological Sciences, Columbia University.

1996, he received the Alexander von Humboldt Senior US scientist award. Fernandez was member of a variety of international peer reviewing committees, including at the National Institutes of Health and the National Science Foundation. From 2003 to 2006 he was chairman of the Biophysical Chemistry Study Section at the NIH.

His major research topic is the interplay between mechanics and biology. In this context, he pioneered work to identify folding intermediates in mechanically unfolded proteins. He published a variety of influential articles in major journals, including Nature, Science and Proceedings of the National Academy of Sciences. Four of his papers are cited more than 300 times, one even more than 1000 times.
