= Chile–Cuba relations =

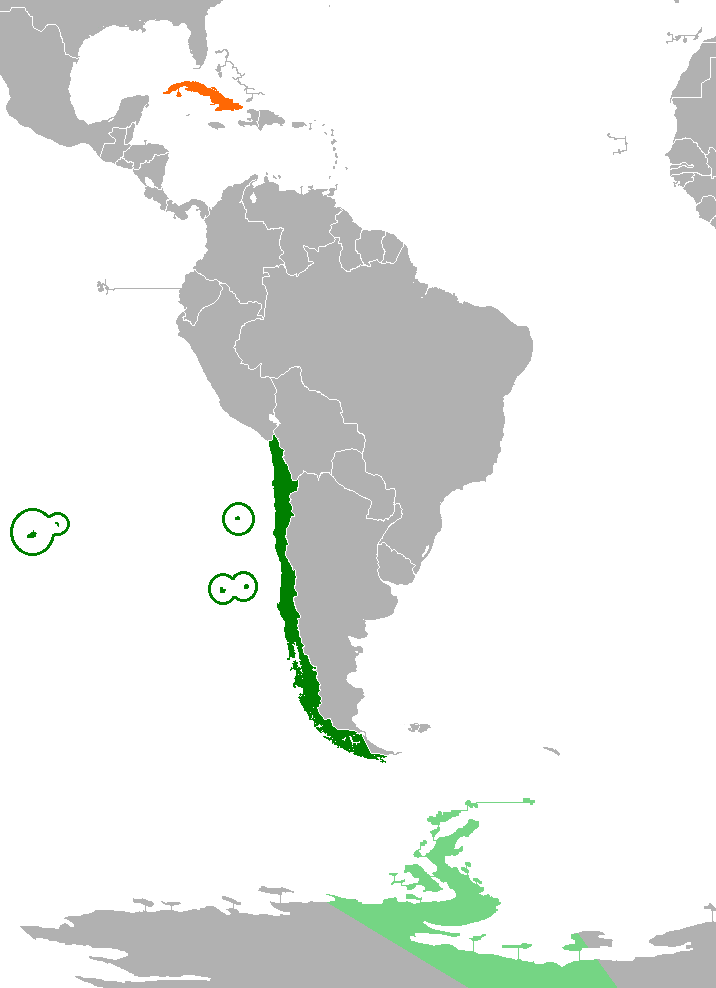

- Chile: Cuba

Chile–Cuba relations refers to interstate relations between the Republic of Chile and the Republic of Cuba. Cuba has been, since the 1960s, a reference point to left wing politicians in Chile.

== History ==
Chile and Cuba established diplomatic relations on 2 April 1909, maintaining a peaceful relationship without major conflicts and based on the idea of Hispanic American brotherhood between two sovereign republics. Prior to this, both the Captaincy General of Cuba and the Kingdom of Chile had formed part of the Spanish Empire.

Chile and Cuba share several similarities, such as experiences with coups d’état and episodes of social unrest. Their constitutions allow for a high degree of participation, which has led to changes in their political systems over time. In Chile, the social unrest that began in 2019 has brought about changes affecting Chilean society for various reasons rooted in the past. By contrast, Cuba is an irrevocably socialist state, which prevents any modification of its socioeconomic system.

=== Cuban Revolution and the break in relations (1959–1970) ===
The beginning of the Cuban Revolution in 1959 had a major impact on Chilean domestic politics, especially on left-wing parties, which did not hesitate to support the Cuban process. While the Socialist Party of Chile (PS) began to radicalize its positions toward the armed struggle, the Revolutionary Left Movement (MIR) sent some of its members to Cuba for guerrilla training. On the right, by contrast, the Conservative and Liberal parties openly rejected the Castro regime, following their anti-communist stance. This position was also reflected in the newspaper El Mercurio, which, although it initially adopted a position of acceptance of the revolution for having put an end to the “tyranny” of Batista, by 1960 was already stating that it “has done nothing more than change one dictatorship for another, with the aggravating factor of the ‘communicant’ tendency (sic) of Fidel Castro’s government.”

The Chilean government at the time, headed by the right-wing president Jorge Alessandri Rodríguez, was an ally of the United States and followed its Alliance for Progress policy. Despite this, the new Cuban government was recognized by Chile on 7 January 1959 through a message from Foreign Minister Germán Vergara Donoso. In return, Cuba withdrew its candidacy for the UN Security Council in 1960, supporting Chile’s candidacy.

Chile, together with Argentina, Brazil, Mexico, Bolivia, and Ecuador, abstained from approving the paragraph that expelled Cuba from the Organization of American States (OAS), voted on at the Eighth Meeting of the organization held in January 1962 in Punta del Este, Uruguay. At the Ninth OAS Meeting, held in Washington, D.C., in June 1964, Chile abstained from voting on a convention that prohibited governments of the Western Hemisphere from maintaining diplomatic relations with Cuba. However, it was obliged to comply with its approval and officially broke relations with Cuba on 11 August.

=== Relations between Fidel Castro and Allende, and the break with Pinochet (1970–1990) ===
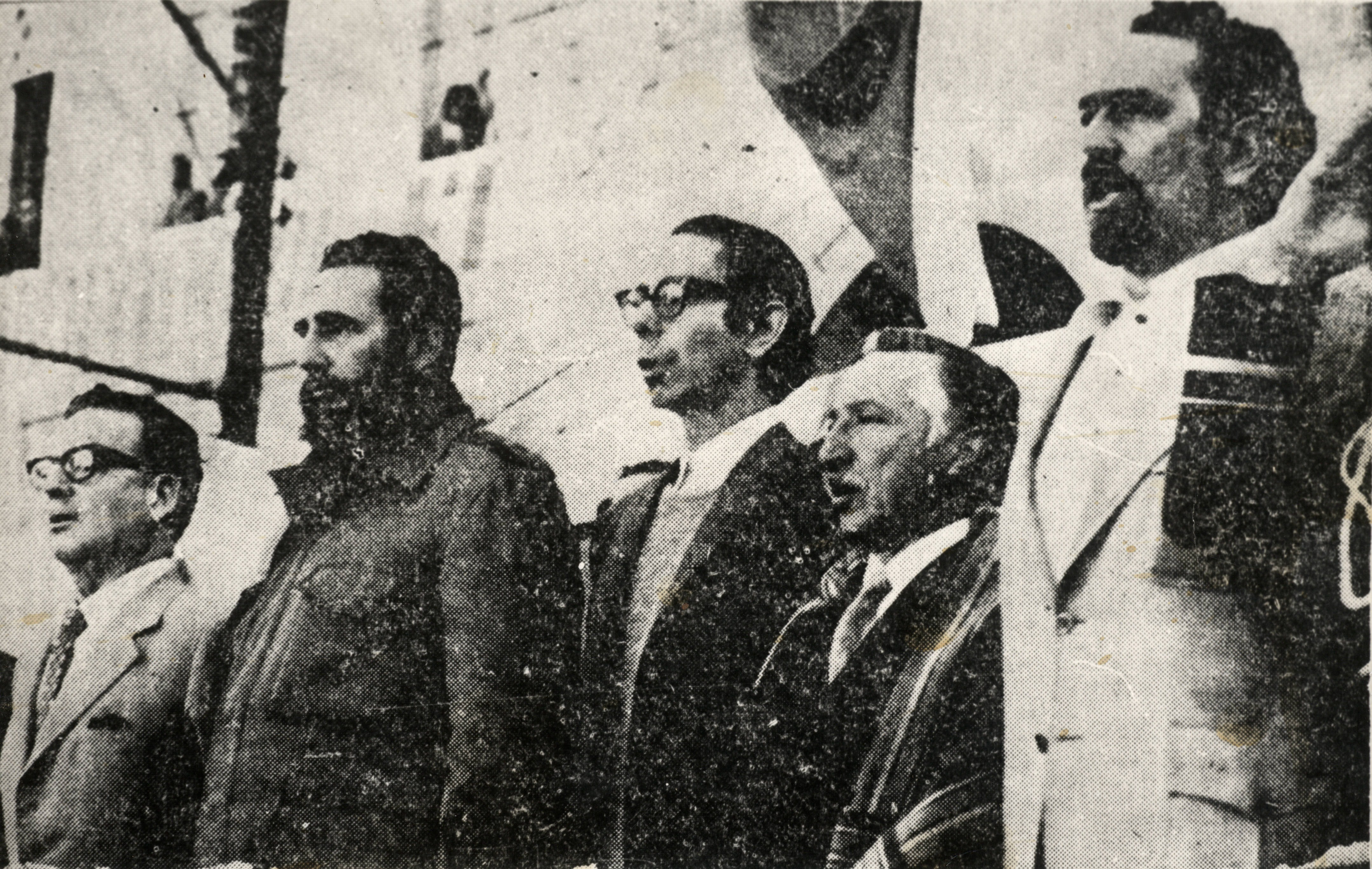
Fidel Castro together with Salvador Allende and other Chilean politicians during his visit to Chile in 1971

In 1970, during the government of the socialist Salvador Allende, Chile restored diplomatic relations with Cuba, joining Mexico and Canada in rejecting the resolution adopted by the OAS in 1964. In December of that year, Allende appointed the writer Jorge Edwards as chargé d’affaires of Chile in Cuba.

Shortly thereafter, Cuban President Fidel Castro paid a month-long state visit to Chile. Together with Allende, he visited the recently nationalized El Teniente copper mine. Likewise, Salvador Allende visited Cuba from 10 to 14 December 1972. In mid-1972, weapons originating from Cuba were brought into Chile in a scandal known as the “Cuban packages” (bultos cubanos).

With the military dictatorship of Augusto Pinochet in Chile (1973–1990), relations between the two countries were broken once again after Chilean troops attacked the headquarters of the Cuban embassy in Santiago. Thanks to the intervention of the Swedish ambassador, Harald Edelstam, the aggression was brought to an end and the Cuban diplomatic corps was able to leave the country. From then until the restoration of democracy, Sweden represented Cuban interests in Chile. The Cuban G2 intelligence service, together with the KGB, developed Operation Tucán, which consisted of managing human rights activists to pressure the United Nations and generate negative press for the Pinochet regime, even going so far as to forge letters from Manuel Contreras, director of the National Intelligence Directorate, which were accepted as authentic by Western media outlets.

From that point on, Cuba provided training and weapons to left-wing groups in Chile in order to establish armed resistance. The Revolutionary Left Movement (MIR) was inspired by the Cuban Revolution and the Sierra Maestra in its attempt to establish a guerrilla movement in Neltume, which was dismantled in 1981. After rural guerrillas inspired by the Cuban model proved to be a failure, Cuba continued to support urban guerrilla movements, primarily the Manuel Rodríguez Patriotic Front (FPMR). One of the largest clandestine shipments of Cuban weapons into Chilean territory occurred at Carrizal Bajo; these weapons were later used by the FPMR in an assassination attempt against Pinochet in 1986.

=== Return to democracy in Chile and resumption of relations (1991–present) ===
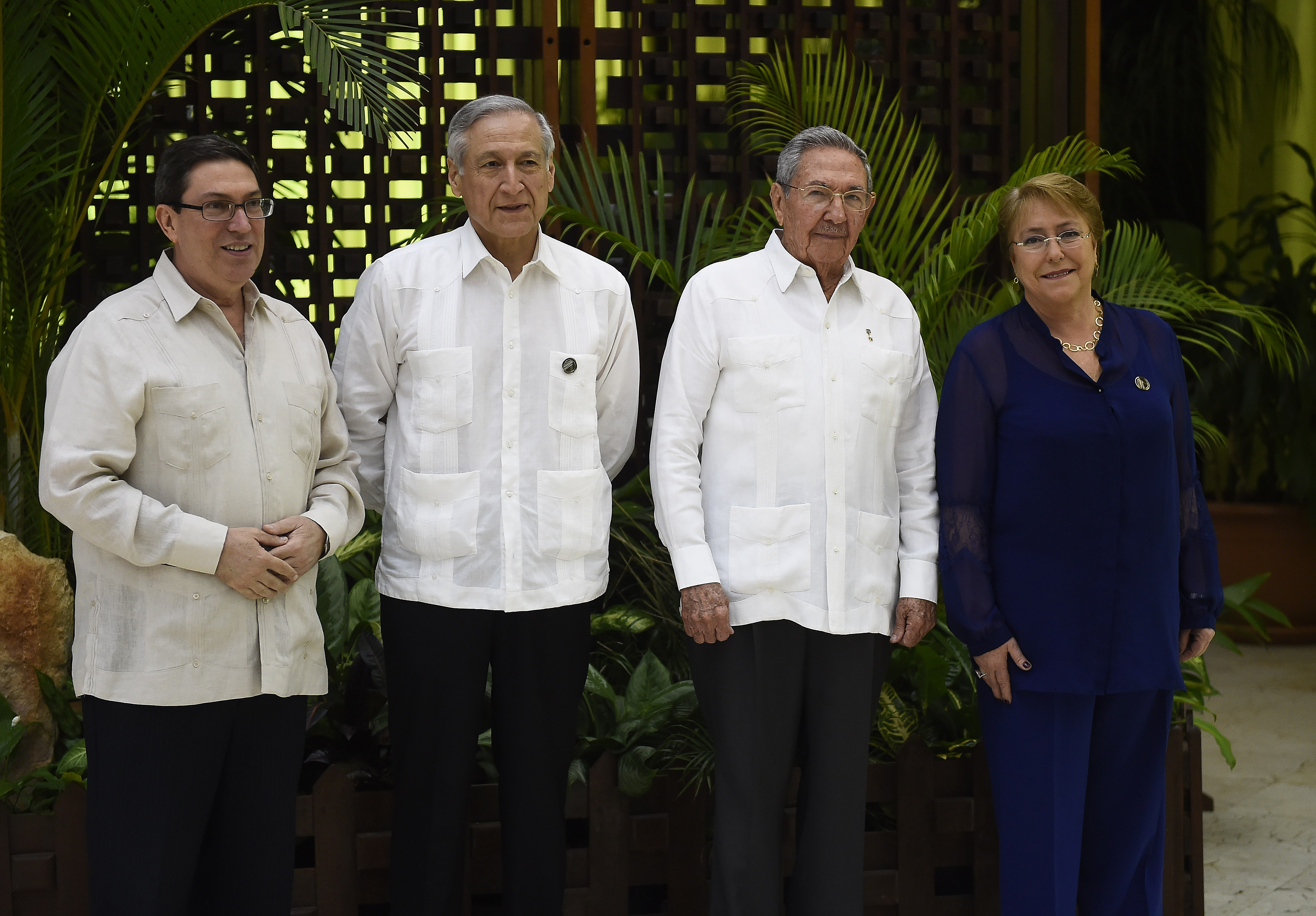
Chile and Cuba were part of the peace process between the Colombian government and the FARC

In 1991, the government of Patricio Aylwin decided to resume relations with Cuba at the consular level, and later, in 1995, under the government of Eduardo Frei Ruiz-Tagle, both countries appointed ambassadors.

During Michelle Bachelet’s first term (2006–2010), relations with Cuba were a recurring issue within the Concertación, the governing coalition, because the Christian Democratic Party supported a more critical stance toward the Cuban government, unlike the Socialist Party. In 2009, Bachelet visited Cuba, becoming the first Chilean president to visit the island since Salvador Allende, who had done so in 1972.

== Trade relations ==
In 2022, trade between the two countries amounted to 23.4 million US dollars, representing an average annual growth of –8% over the past five years. The main products exported by Chile were powdered milk, cardboard boxes, and Gouda cheese, while Cuba mainly exported rum and cigars.

== Resident diplomatic missions ==
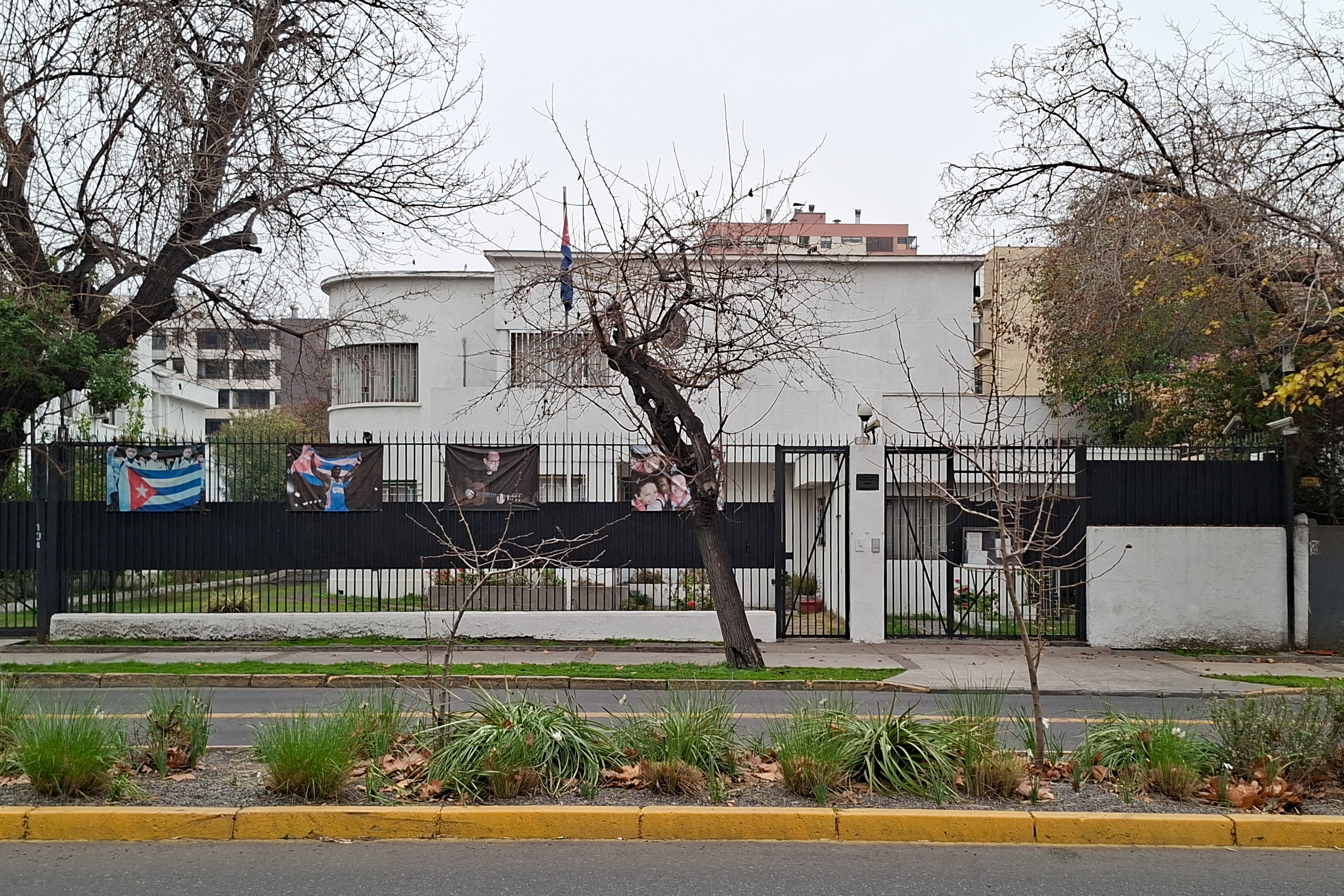
Embassy of Cuba in Santiago

- Chile has an embassy in Havana.
- Cuba has an embassy in Santiago.

== Chilean ambassadors to Cuba ==
- Jorge Manuel Toha (2006)
- Mauricio Hurtado Navia (2018)

== See also ==
- Foreign relations of Chile
- Foreign relations of Cuba
- Fidel Castro's state visit to Chile

== Bibliography ==
- Fermandois, Joaquín (1982). "Chile y la "cuestión cubana" 1959-1964" (PDF). Historia (in Spanish) (17). Santiago: 113–200. Archived from the original (PDF) on 15 August 2016.
