= International School Nido de Aguilas =

International school in Santiago, Chile

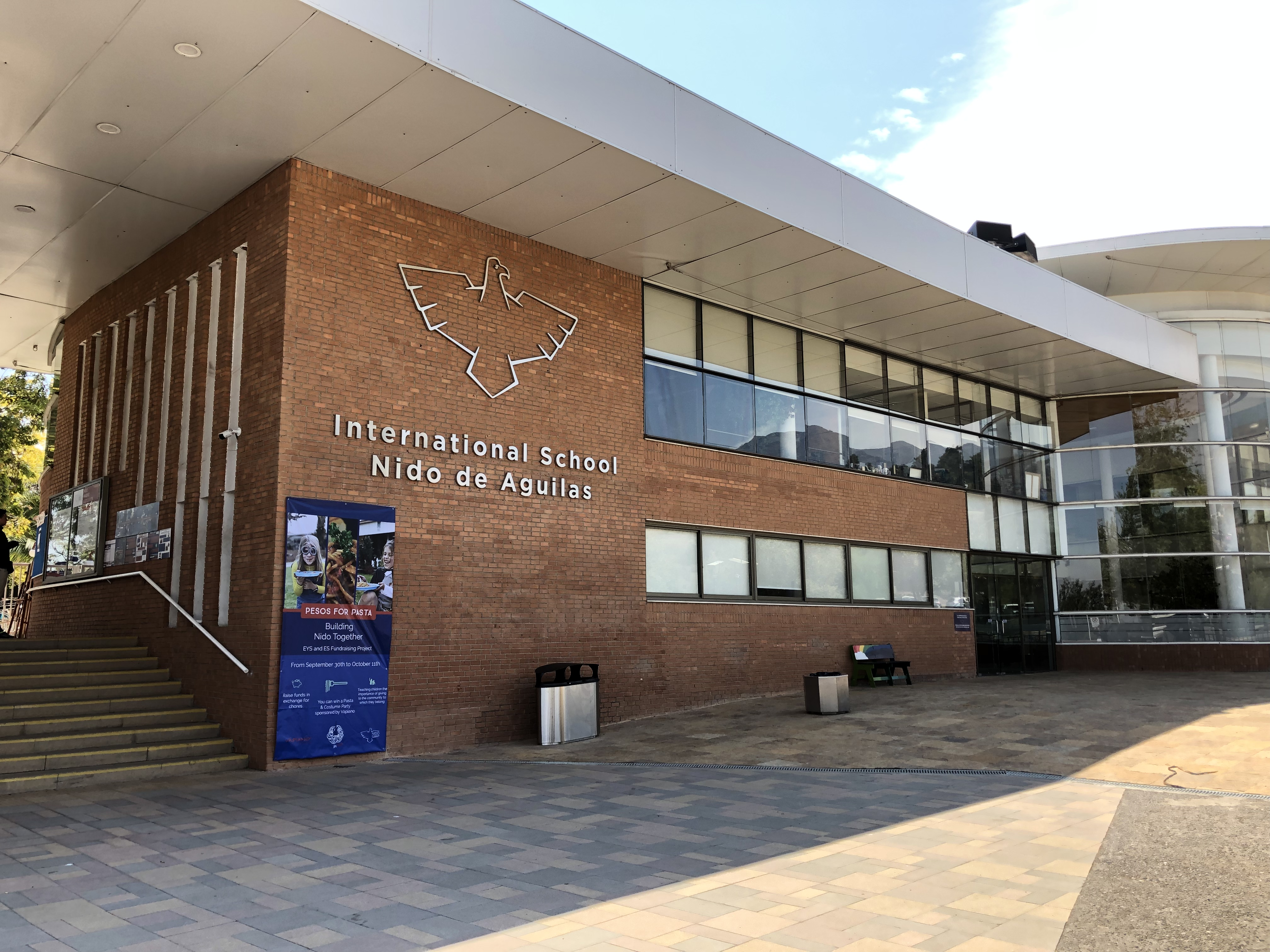
- The school's entrance

Location
- Avenida El Rodeo 14200, Lo Barnechea; Santiago; Chile
- Coordinates: 33.350483°S 70.501144°W

Information
- Type: Private international school
- Established: 1934; 92 years ago
- Founders: Waldo Stevenson; Juanita Keller
- CEEB code: 920450
- Headmaster: Ken Kunin
- Teaching staff: 246
- Grades: PreK-12
- Gender: Coeducational
- Enrollment: ~1,800 (2018)
- Student to teacher ratio: 1:7.3
- Language: English
- Mascot: Eagle
- Accreditation: NEASC; Chilean Ministry of Education
- Website: www.nido.cl

The International School Nido de Aguilas is a private, non-profit co-educational international school in Santiago, Chile.

Founded in 1934 as the main international school in Santiago, it provides an English language education to both the city's international community and Chileans. Its student body consists of students from over 50 countries. The school serves students from the age of 3 through 12th grade, and high school students are offered International Baccalaureate courses using a North American-style program. Nido de Aguilas is one of the few schools in Chile that follows a northern hemisphere calendar, with classes running from July to June.

== History ==
Nido de Aguilas was founded in 1934 as a private, co-educational, non-sectarian, non-profit day school rooted in traditions of Chilean and North American education. The school was founded by Dr. Waldo Stevenson and Juanita Keller with the aim of providing a high-level education in English coupled with environmental awareness. The campus has been moved three times since the establishment of the school. The first campus was located in the Peñalolén commune of Santiago. The school moved to a second campus in 1949 in what is now known as La Reina. In 1964, after a donation of land and financial contribution from the United States Government, it opened its current location in Lo Barnechea. In 1982, Nido began offering the IB program to students. 6 years later, in 1988, the school switched to a northern hemisphere school calendar.

As of 2025, the school is located on a 150-acre site in Lo Barnechea, approximately 20 minutes from downtown Santiago. Originally situated well outside the built-up areas of Santiago, it is now surrounded by residential areas.

== Curriculum ==
Nido de Aguilas serves just over 1550 students from more than 50 countries and offers a liberal arts, college preparatory educational program from PreKinder (age three) through Grade 12. Nido is the official U.S. State Department Office of Overseas Education School in Chile and serves the international business and diplomatic communities as well as Chileans seeking a North American style of education.

== See also ==
- List of international schools
