= Chile–Italy relations =

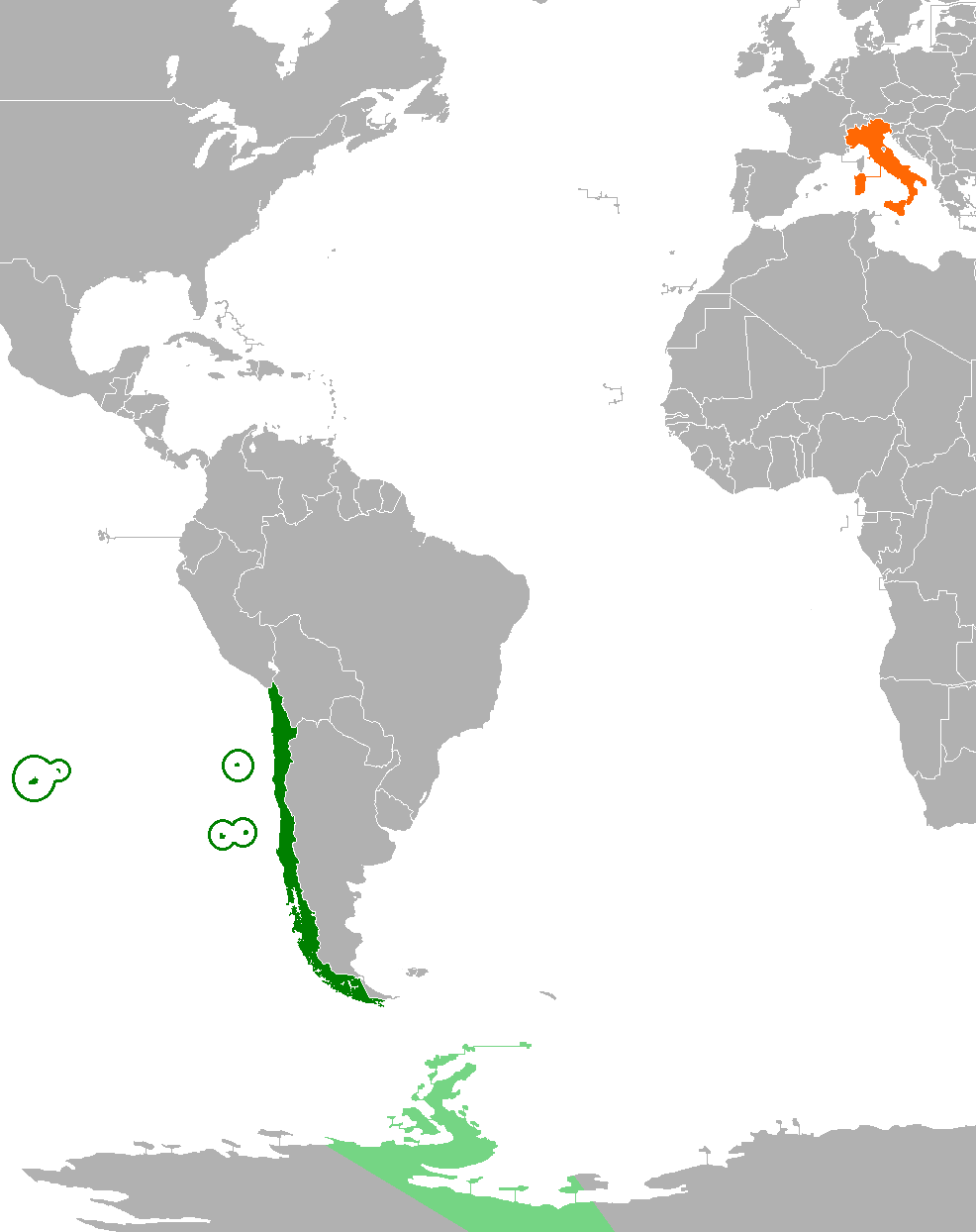
- Chile: Italy

Chile–Italy relations are the current and historical relations between the Republic of Chile and the Italian Republic. The relationship between Chile and Italy is based on a long history of contacts that have taken place at the political level, but also due to the presence of an important Italian community in Chile and Chileans in Italy. Both nations are members of the OECD and the United Nations.

== History ==
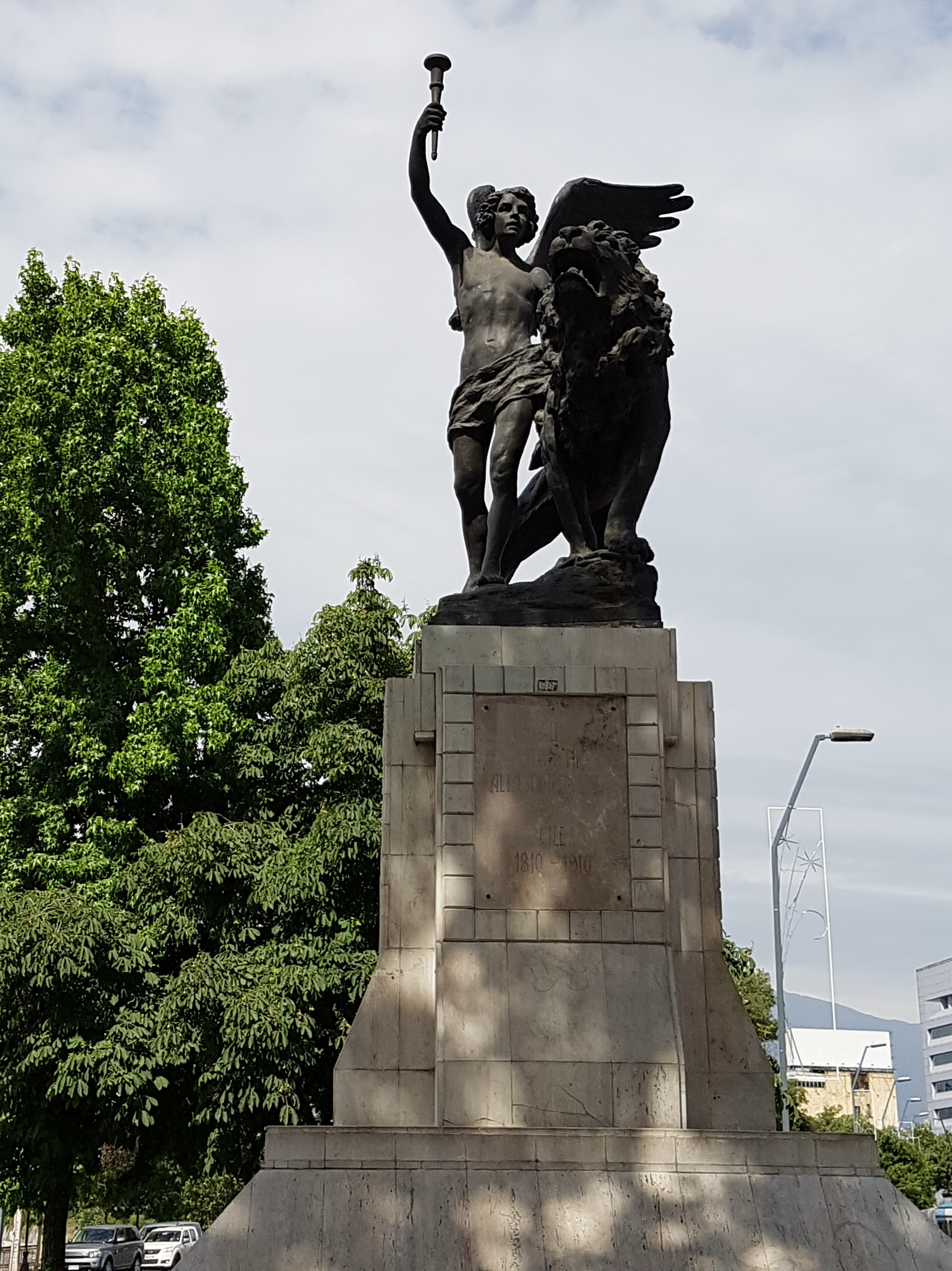
Monument to the Genius of Liberty donated by the Italian community in Chile in commemoration of Chile's centenary.

In 1818, Chile declared its independence from Spain. At the same time, Italy was made up of separate independent Italian states. In 1857, the Kingdom of Sardinia and Chile signed a Treaty of Friendship, Commerce and Navigation. In January 1864, Chile recognized the newly unified Italy when then Chilean President José Joaquín Pérez sent a letter in response to King Vittorio Emanuele II request for recognition. The following month, a Chilean Ambassador was appointed to the Italian court.

Between 1880 and 1930 over 10,000 Italians migrated to Chile, most of them settling in Santiago and in Valparaíso. In 1924, Italian Prince Umberto of Piedmont (future King Umberto II) visited Chile. The Prince's main visit to Chile (and other South American nations) was part of a political plan of fascism to link the Italian people living outside of Italy with their mother country. In 1943 during World War II, Chile broke off relations with the Axis powers (which included Italy) and citizens of enemy nations were interred at Pisagua internment camp. During the 1962 FIFA World Cup, hosted by Chile, two Italian journalists wrote an extremely disparaging report on the country which was subsequently published in Chile and which ultimately led to a violent clash when the two teams played each other in a game which became known as the "Battle of Santiago".

On 11 September 1973, the government of President Salvador Allende suffered a coup d'état by General Augusto Pinochet who was backed by the government of the United States. President Allende was declared to have committed suicide during the coup and General Pinochet took over the government and became the new President of the country. Immediately, President Pinochet began arresting, torturing and executing followers of President Allende. During this time, thousands of Chileans sought refuge in mainly European and Latin American embassies in the Chilean capital. Approximately 700 Chileans and Italians escaped to the Italian embassy in Santiago for refugee. In November 1974, the body of a Chilean woman was thrown over the walls of the Italian embassy. The woman, Lumi Videla, had obvious signs of torture. It was a ploy by the Chilean government to spread false rumors that the woman had died within the walls of the embassy and falsely claim that the asylees had killed her as a pretext to increase pressure on the embassy housing several anti-government supporters. The Italian government did assist several of the asylees to leave the embassy to Argentina and a few were resettled in Italy. Between 1973 and 1989, Italy did not appoint an Ambassador to Chile.

In recent years the relationship has intensified both on a political, commercial and cultural level. In 2002, Chile signed a free trade agreement with the European Union (which includes Italy). In June 2015, Chilean President Michelle Bachelet paid a state visit to Italy. In October 2015, Italian Prime Minister Matteo Renzi paid a visit to Chile.

== Bilateral agreements ==
Both nations have signed several agreements such as a Trade and Navigation Treaty (1911); Agreement on Military Service (1959); Agreement for Economic, Industrial and Scientific Cooperation (1994); Agreement on Technical and Cultural Cooperation (1994); Agreement for the Promotion and Protection of Investments and its Protocol (1995); Agreement of Cooperation in the fight against Terrorism, Organized Crime and Drug Trafficking (1996); Agreement on Cultural Collaboration and its executive protocols (1997); Antarctic Cooperation Agreement (2001); Agreement of technical cooperation and mutual assistance between the Carabineros de Chile and the Italian Carabinieri (2006); Mutual Assistance Treaty in Criminal Matters (2011); Cinematographic Co-Production Agreement (2013); Agreement of Cooperation in the Defense sector (2016); Agreement to Eliminate Double Taxation in Relation to Income Taxes and to Prevent Tax Evasion and its Protocol (2016); Mutual Administrative Assistance Agreement for the Prevention, Investigation and Repression of Customs Offenses (2017) and an Extradition Treaty (2017).

== Resident diplomatic missions ==
- Chile has an embassy in Rome and a consulate-general in Milan.
- Italy has an embassy in Santiago.
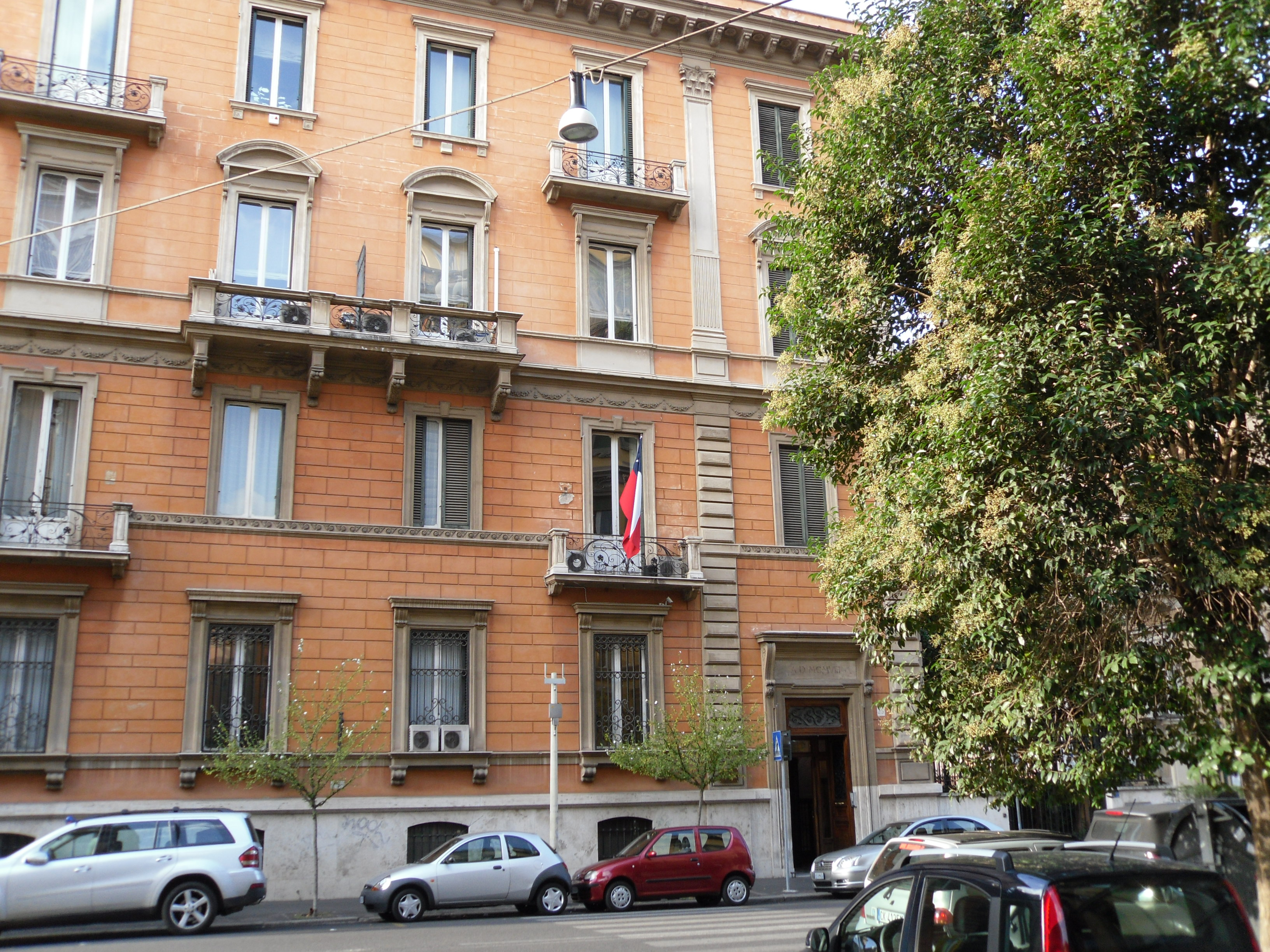
Former Embassy of Chile in Rome

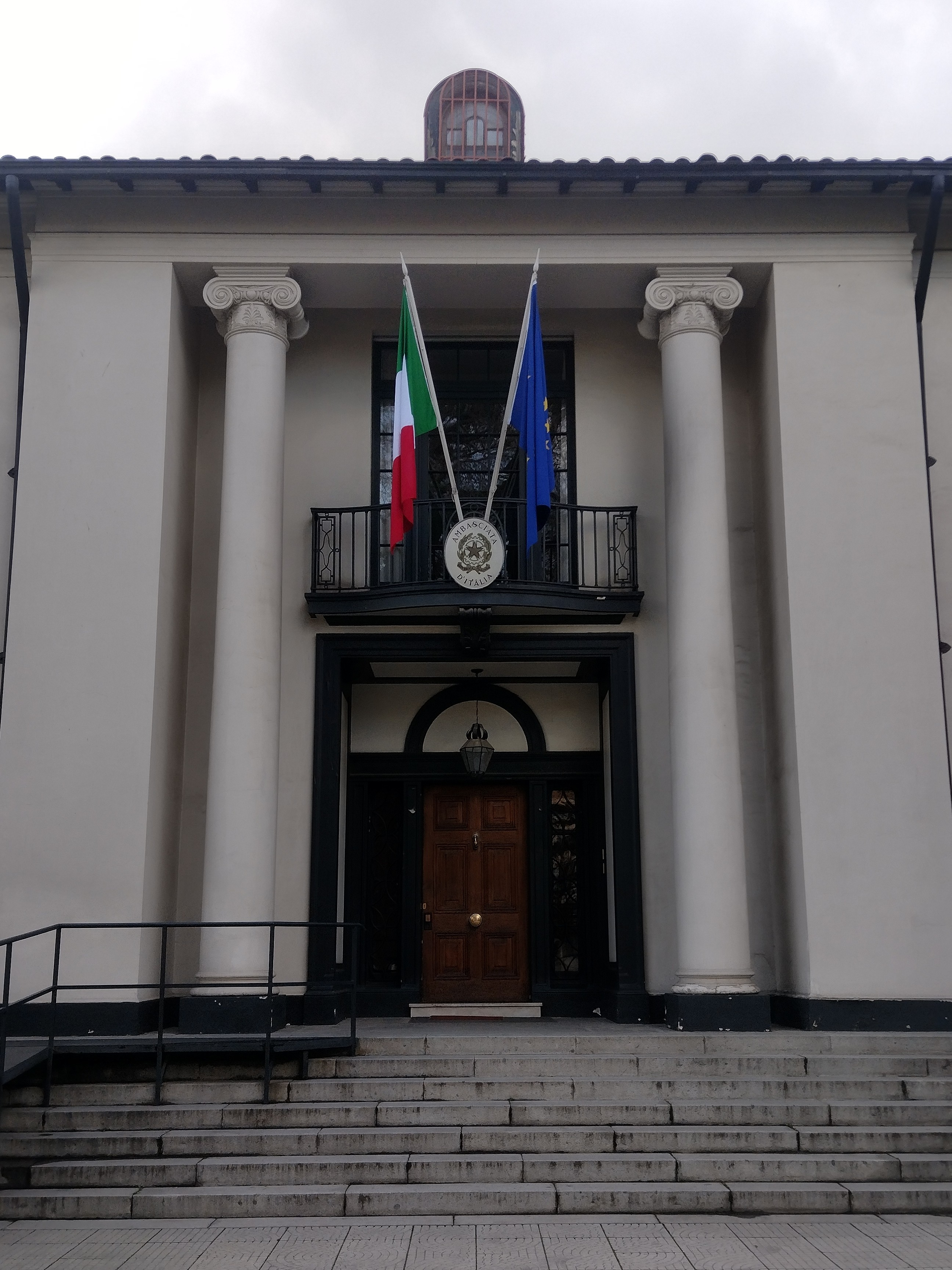
Embassy of Italy in Santiago

== See also ==
- Italian Chileans
