= David Adams =

David Adams may refer to:

== Government officials ==
- David S. Adams (State Department) (born 1961), assistant secretary of state for Legislative Affairs
- David Adams (Labour politician) (1871–1943), British Labour Party member of parliament, 1922–1923 and 1935–1943
- David Adams (Australian politician) (1930–2021), Australian Capital Territory politician
- David Adams (loyalist) (born c. 1953), Northern Irish loyalist activist and former politician
- Dave Adams (naval officer), officer in the US Navy
- David Morgan Adams (1875–1942), British member of parliament for Poplar South, 1931–1942

== Sports ==
- David Adams (dancer) (1928–2007), Canadian ballet dancer
- David Adams (baseball) (born 1987), American baseball player
- Dave Adams (Canadian football) (1920–2011), Canadian football guard
- David Adams (gridiron football) (born 1964), gridiron football running back
- David Adams (rugby league) (born 1957), Australian rugby league footballer
- David Adams (tennis) (born 1970), South African tennis player
- Davey Adams (1883–1948), Scottish footballer (Celtic FC)
- David Adams (football manager) (born 1979), Welsh football coach and academic

== Other people ==
- David H. Adams (born 1957), American cardiac surgeon
- David Adams (video game designer) (born 1975), American video game designer
- David S. Adams (biologist), American biologist known for his work on Alzheimer's disease
- Dave Adams (musician) (1938–2016), British musician from Saint Helier, Jersey
- David Adams (photojournalist) (born 1963), Australian photojournalist and cultural documentary film presenter
- Ryan Adams (David Ryan Adams, born 1974), American musician, songwriter and author
- David Hempleman-Adams (born 1956), British adventurer
- David B. Adams (born 1950), American professor of surgery
- David Adams (Congregationalist divine) (1845–1923), Congregationalist minister and schoolmaster
- David Adams (peace activist) (born 1939), American peace activist, scientist, scholar, writer and journalist
- David Laird Adams (1837–1892), Scottish professor of Hebrew and Oriental languages

== See also ==
- David Adam (disambiguation)
- Adams (surname)
