= Canada–Latin America relations =

Diplomatic relations

Canada

Latin America

Canada has various ties to the countries of Latin America. This includes the bilateral ties between Canada and the individual Latin American states, plurilateral ties between Canada and any group of those states, or multilateral relations through groups like the Organization of American States (OAS).

Canada and Latin America share ties of geography as part of the Western Hemisphere and history through the shared experience of European colonization. Culturally, Canada shares with the other societies in the Americas a mixture of European, Amerindian, and immigrant influences. For both Canadians and Latin Americans, the importance of relations with the United States may overshadow relations with each other. However Canada's importance in the region has risen since joining the OAS in 1990.

== Historical relations to 1968 ==
In the decades following Canadian Confederation in 1867, Canada had limited political involvement, but after 1898 had significant economic ties in the Caribbean, Mexico and Brazil and Canadians went as businessmen and missionaries to a number of other countries. As Canadian foreign policy was largely constrained by Canada's ties to the British Empire, political and economic relations remained tethered and controlled. Even after Canada gained political autonomy in foreign relations with the Statute of Westminster (1931) relations with Latin America remained weak due to domestic economic turmoil.

Following increased solidarity between regions in Latin America throughout the 1800s came the birth of the Pan-American Union in 1910. Between 1909 and 1941 Latin American states (Argentina, Brazil, Chile, Mexico and others) repeatedly appealed for Canadian involvement in union. In accordance with the Monroe Doctrine the United States actively opposed Canadian involvement as Canada's foreign relations were subject to the interests of a European power, Britain. Nevertheless, Canada remained outside of the union for reasons of economic disinterest.

By the early 1940s, Canada had become a relatively important industrial producer that was in desperate need of integration in additional foreign markets. Devastation in Europe due to World War II made Latin America a logical alternative. Unfortunately for Canadian interests, the period following the Second World War marked an important shift in the world political and economic order that saw the growth and spread of communism.

The onset of the Cold War had important implications for Canadian foreign policy. Significantly, Canadian officials saw Latin America as a region particularly vulnerable to the spread of communism because of vast underdevelopment and socio-economic disparities. More importantly for Canada, however, was the immense propagation of American economic and political dominance and Americanization throughout the world. While Canada, like the United States during the early cold war years, could be viewed as a liberal-democracy devoted to the spread of capitalism and free market ideals, the Canadian form of the ideology was inherently more accepting of socialist facets. Effectively, Canada grew closer to many Latin American states and often acted as a mediator between the United States and Latin America.

== Trudeau years 1968–1984 ==
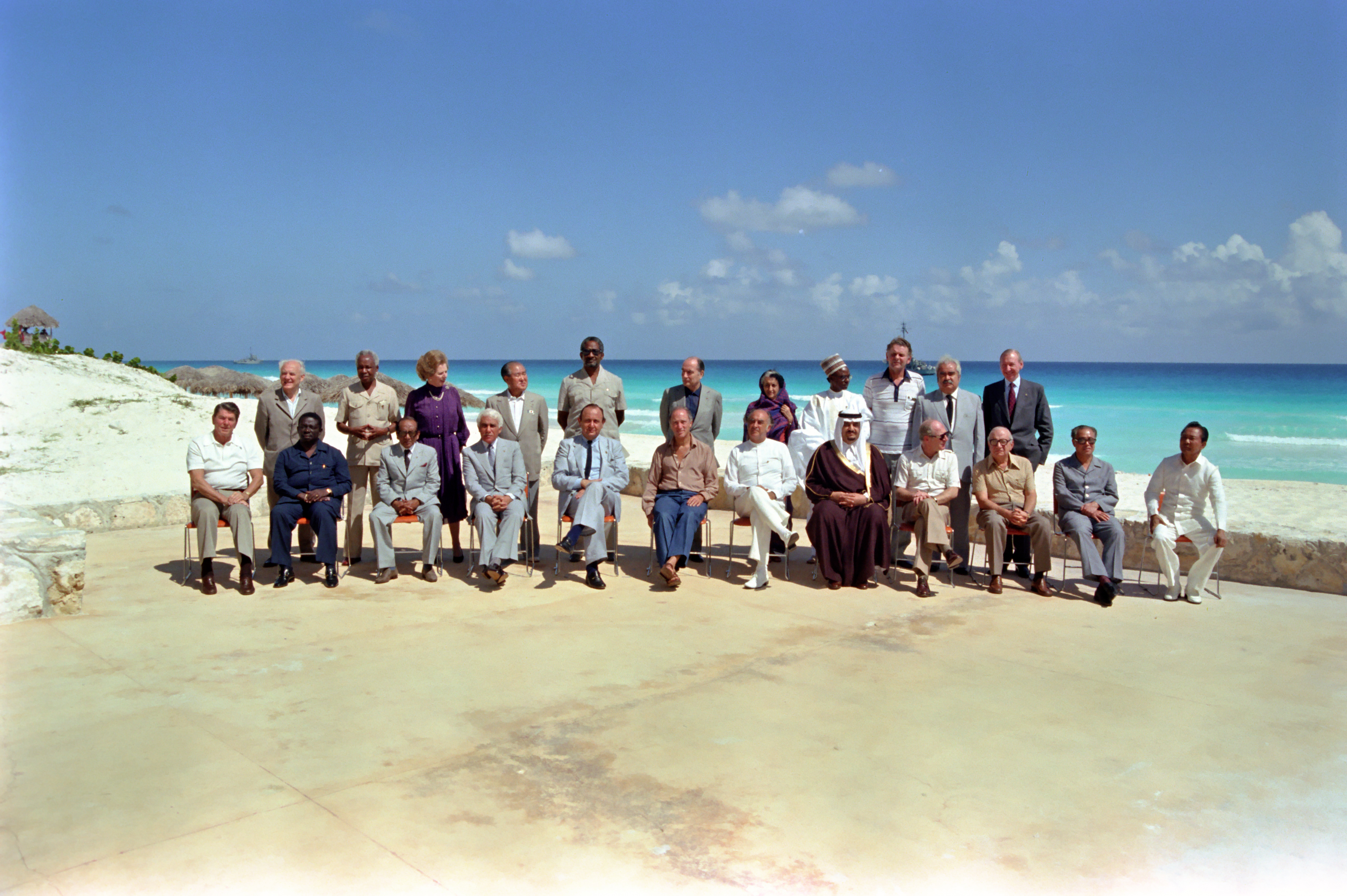
Prime Minister Pierre Trudeau attending the North–South Summit along with his Mexican counterpart, President José López Portillo in Cancún, Mexico; October 1981.

The early years of Pierre Trudeau's time in office as Prime Minister of Canada marked an important shift in Canada's role in international politics. During this time Canada, under Trudeau's realist and pragmatist ideals, began to view relations with previously untapped global regions such as Latin America as vital to Canada's future political and economic interests. Trudeau illuminates these ideas: "We have to take greater account of the ties which bind us to other nations in this hemisphere – in the Caribbean, Latin America – and of their economic needs. We have to explore relations with Latin America, where more than 400 million people will live by the turn of the century and where we have substantial interests" – Pierre Elliot Trudeau

Between October and November 1968, Canada sent a delegate of various ministers to tour nine Latin American states (Argentina, Brazil, Chile, Colombia, Peru, Venezuela, Mexico, Costa Rica, Guatemala) as a stage in Canada's foreign policy review. From the excursion Canada aimed to a) evaluate potential benefits from increased relations, b) explore global policy congruence with individual Latin American states, c) improve overall relations in South America. Ultimately, the mission garnered results on several fronts related to issues of economic cooperation, integration and growth, security and nuclear non-proliferation, as well as general information gathering.

The 1968 mission had two profound institutional effects. First, the mission directly led to the creation of a Latin American task force in 1969. This task force was at the forefront of issues involving Canada's role/potential role in joining the Organization of American States (OAS). Second, the mission was elemental in establishing the founding principles of the Latin American section of Trudeau's complete revision of foreign policy – a series of documents entitled "Foreign Policy for Canadians" released in 1970. This series of documents considered massive changes in global power dynamics (e.g. the reduced threat of communism), the role of non-state actors, and the absolute necessity of preserving Canadian independence.

In the years following these diplomatic advancements came several key initiatives, programs and institutions. In 1971, to deal with issues of Latin American integration, Trudeau founded the Bureau of Western-Hemispheric Affairs. In 1972, Canada officially entered the OAS under observer status and joined the Inter-American Development Bank to increasingly aid developmental initiatives in Latin America. Further, by 1972, Canada had seen an increase of roughly 40% in exports to the region in only 4 years and made tremendous progress with individual states like Brazil, Argentina, and Venezuela. In spite of some minor shortcomings in certain Latin American states, Canada was overwhelming pleased with advancements in relations between the two regions by 1973.

By the mid-1970s Canada's national policy toward Latin America – and other regions of the globe – had almost completely diverged from that of the United States. This was an especially momentous time in Canadian foreign politics because, until this point, Canada had been under the vast political and economic influence of her neighbour to the South. This incredible divergence was essentially manifested in Mitchell Sharp's "Options for the Future" (otherwise known as the 'Third Option Paper'), which reaffirmed the tenets of "Foreign Policy for Canadians", but considered U.S.–Canada relations in greater detail. Sharp's paper advocated the growth of Canadian economic, political and cultural 'distinctiveness', but did not encourage alienation from America. Ultimately, Sharp's ideas had a profound and lasting effect on Canadian policy and were central to the outward growth of Canada in the international sphere for many years.

By and large, the 1970s represented a period of growth in Canada–Latin America relations that produced episodes of incredible significance and garnered tremendous potential for future relations. Importantly, the emerging distinctiveness of Canada on the global stage (in an increasingly multi-polar international system) was particularly visible in relations with Latin America. In radical deviation from the policies and ideological attitudes of the United States, Canada pursued policies of tolerance and acceptance with respect to Latin American states. Canadian tolerance was evident throughout the 1970s – with the acceptance of thousands of leftist Chilean refugees between 1970 and 1980, opposition to various American political interventions in South America, or Trudeau's tour of Mexico, Venezuela, and Cuba in 1976.

New notions of trans-hemispheric integration/relations began to take prominence as Canada found itself involved in Latin American affairs in a meaningful way. By the late 1970s Canada called for the progressive advancement of the OAS that was deemed by Canadian observers as ineffective and deficient. By 1979, Canada sought global channels and forums, namely the United Nations, to vocalize discontent, concerns, and thoughts on inter-American affairs that included trading blocs, nuclear proliferation issues, and human rights abuses (in the case of Argentina).

The period between 1980 and 1984 would mark the final term of Trudeau. By this point, Canadian interests and objectives in the hemisphere were completely unsynchronized with the views and objectives of the United States (especially under the conservative reigns of Ronald Reagan, 1981–1989). During this time, Canada favoured leftist policies both at home and abroad and continued to nurture ideological diversity, while the United States, under Reagan, emphasized the importance of laissez-faire capitalism, (in a resurgence of anti-communist discourse), reduction of the welfare state, and discrete military intervention to accommodate American interests in Latin America and the world. Reagan's rationale was unequivocally based in the decline of American hegemony and aimed to bring prominence back to America by staunch opposition to left-wing movements in Latin America such as the Nicaraguan Sandinistas.

Importantly, however, Canada revived Third Option ideals of political and economic distinctiveness that was briefly lost to Joe Clark's Progressive Conservatives from June 1979 to February 1980. Diversification and distinctiveness of Canadian policy were evident in Trudeau's creation of the National Energy Program, the extension of the Foreign Investment Review Agency, and the formulation of specific Central American policy in 1982. Such advancements in Canadian policy were almost immediately contested by the United States. At any rate, Canada had good reason to be optimistic in the international sphere. Unfortunately, just as Trudeau's policies of peace and diplomacy in Latin America began to peak the Latin American debt crisis retarded any potential growth beginning in 1982. In fact, in a four-year period between 1980 and 1984 Canadian exports to Latin America were cut in half. Despite this setback, Canadian investment in the region remained high and the government of Canada remained committed to the pursuit of mutually beneficial relations between the two regions.

== Post-Trudeau policy ==
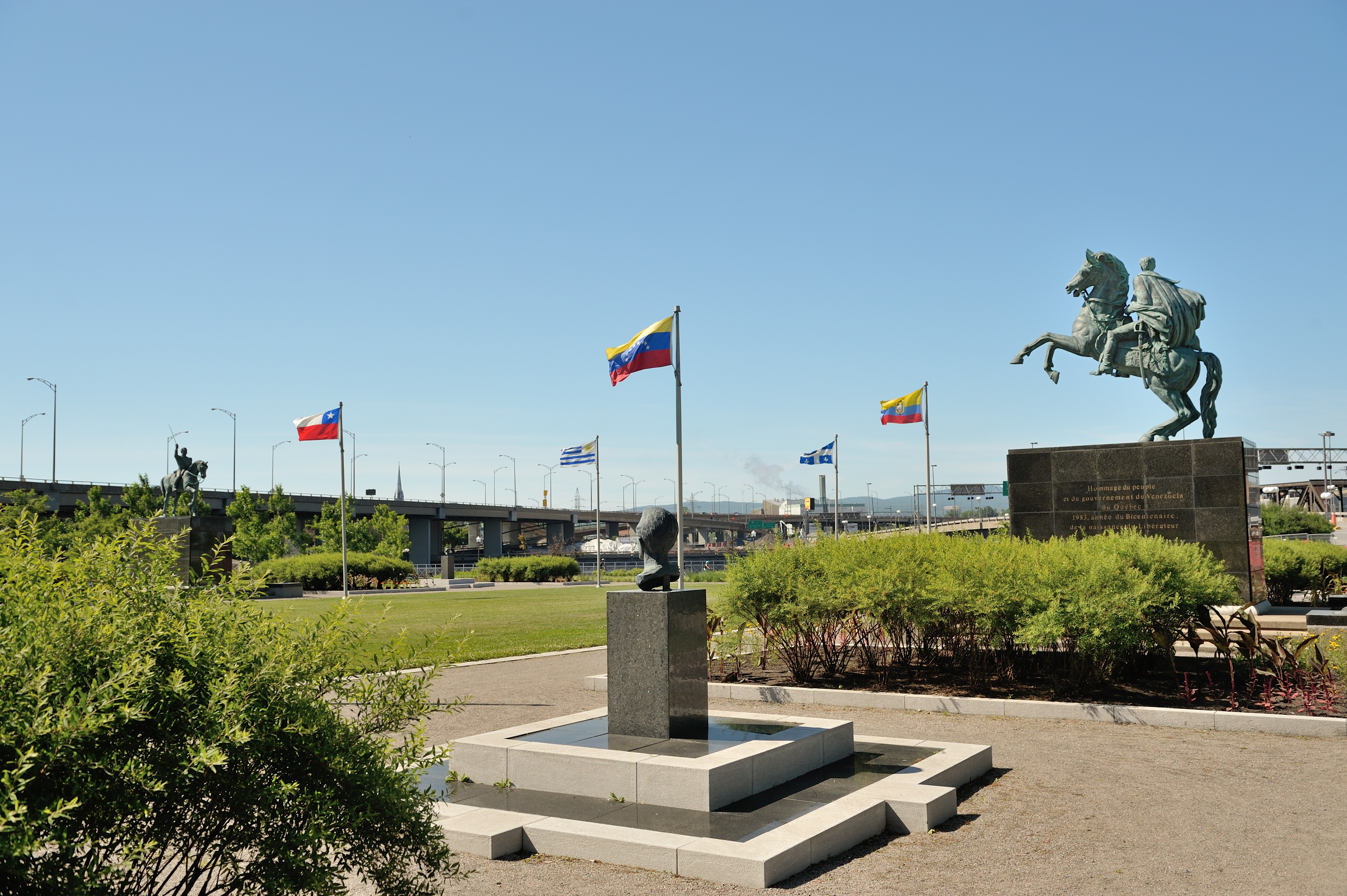
The Parc de l'Amérique-Latine in La Cité-Limoilou, Quebec City is a park opened in 1995 to highlight the ties between Quebec and Latin America

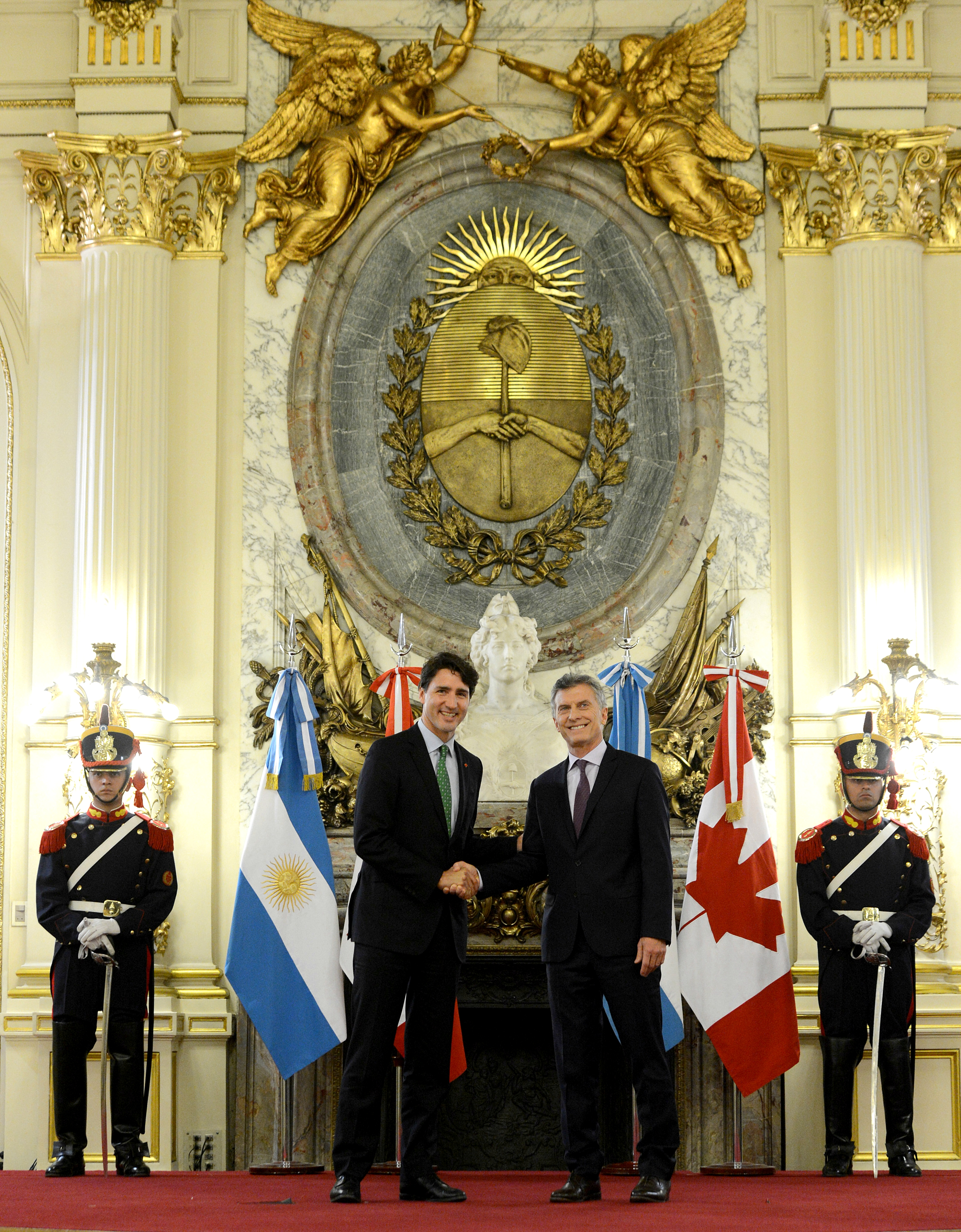
Canadian Prime Minister Justin Trudeau and Argentine President Mauricio Macri in Buenos Aires, 2016.

The Mulroney years were a tumultuous time for Canadian foreign policy. Brian Mulroney, after being elected in 1984, almost immediately began to retract the ideals of distinctiveness ushered in by Sharp and Trudeau in favour of closer ties with the United States. Most notably, Mulroney would negotiate the landmark Canada–United States Free Trade Agreement in 1987 (which would later evolve into the North American Free Trade Agreement (NAFTA)). However, in spite of overarching support for American policies Mulroney did deviate and even oppose American policies in several key respects. Importantly, Canada remained vocally opposed to Reagan's various anti-communist interventions in Latin America under Mulroney, and accepted refugees from several Latin American states. Yet, the acceptance of ideological diversity under Trudeau had already been fundamentally altered as Mulroney pursued policies based in American style neo-liberal economic policy and laissez faire capitalism. Clearly, these ideals were increasingly manifested and enforced in Latin American and helped garner widespread regime transition.

While the onset of the Cold War helped spur interconnectedness between Canada and Latin America the erosion of Soviet power in the late 1980s gave way to an even more robust partnership. By 1985 the Soviet empire was becoming increasingly bankrupt and unable to promote socialist ideology abroad. For many leftist Latin American states this generated a significant void in support for their vast nationalist/leftist movements. Thus, from the altering world balance came the proliferation of peace talks, the emergence of new economic regimes, and increasingly intertwined relations between the Northern and the Southern Western hemisphere. Canada's policies towards the region revolved around this new economic order that saw the distribution of power slipping from a bipolar system to multiple states, organizations, and corporations.

One of the most crucial developments of trans-hemispheric relations for Canada during Mulroney's time in office came in Canada's official enrollment in the OAS in 1990. Until this point Canada's position on the institution was that it existed as a tool of American political and economic preponderance in Latin America. However, with the erosion of Cold War tensions, waning American hegemonic interests in the region, and the proliferation of democracy throughout Latin America Canada saw the increasing importance of the OAS as a unifying institution.

Canada's acceptance into the OAS in 1990 marked the continuation of strengthened interaction with the Americas. Along with the political and economic benefits associated with this union came increased support of democratic ideals and free trade discourse, as well as increased discussion of trans-hemispheric issues such as racism, sexism, wealth distribution and other social-cultural concerns.

One prominent factor in the evolution of Canadian policy toward Latin America is seen in the concept of globalization. The process of globalization has had a major and in integrating Canada and Latin America; at the same time, this increasing integration has also fueled globalization. The emergence of strong and diverse foreign markets (especially those in countries like Brazil and Mexico) has ushered in a series of foreign policy adjustments in Canada that have revolved around investment, development, and increased commerce in such markets. In recent years Canadian policy adjustments have helped furnish an increase in total trade with Latin America – $50 billion in 2006 (up 500% from 1990). Likewise, North American led implementation of western style laissez faire capitalism, trade liberalization policies, and the dissolution of tariffs has had an overwhelming effect on Northern integration (and in some cases, dominance) of Latin America. Yet the effect of globalization on integrating the regions through foreign policy extends beyond politics and economics. The mass movement of people and information across borders (an inherent facet of globalization) has also garnered policy changes in respect to migration and cultural movement over the past few decades.

Since the early 1990s Canadian relations with Latin America have, to an extent, leveled off and Canada can be considered an important actor in the continued development, growth and integration of the entire hemisphere. However, in many ways, the future of Canada as a part of the Americas remains uncertain. Questions of complete hemispheric economic integration, unified currency and free trade remain prominent issues in the media.

In 2007, for one of his first major trips overseas, Prime Minister Stephen Harper visited Colombia, Chile, Barbados and Haiti, while the same time the governor general, Michaëlle Jean, was visiting Brazil. Observers said this was intended increase Canada's visibility in the region and to remind Canadians of the region's importance.

In 2010, Canada was specifically excluded (along with the United States) from a newly formed regional body, the Community of Latin American and Caribbean States, which includes all other sovereign states in the Americas.

=== Canada–Venezuela relations ===
Canada's most important initiative in its foreign policy toward Latin America in recent years has been its efforts, along with partners in the hemisphere, to pressure the regime of Nicolás Maduro in Venezuela to allow free and fair elections and end the political, economic and humanitarian crisis in this key South American nation. Canada-Venezuela relations have been on good terms since the establishment of diplomatic relationship between the two countries in the 1950s. Those relations however began to sour under Conservative Prime Minister Harper and President Hugo Chávez, and became sour under Liberal Prime Minister Trudeau (2015- ). Indeed, over the past few years, Canada has stepped out of its comfort zone in hemispheric affairs, to speak and act forcefully, as Canadian Foreign Minister Chrystia Freeland put it, in solidarity with "the people of Venezuela and their desire to restore democracy and human in Venezuela". On January 23, 2019, Minister Freeland issued the statement that “Canada recognizes Juan Guaidó, President of the National Assembly, as the interim President of Venezuela." On that occasion she called the Nicolás Maduro government "despicable". Ottawa imposed targeted sanctions (under the Special Economic Measures Act and the new Justice for Victims of Corrupt Foreign Officials Act) against 70 Maduro government officials. Canada has sanctions and related measures in place against nineteen other countries in the world, but only against Venezuela in the southern hemisphere. Canada has been an active member of the Lima Group to put pressure on the Maduro regime. The Lima Group was established on August 8, 2017, in Lima, Peru, to coordinate participating countries’ efforts and apply international pressure on Venezuela. Meetings of the group have been regularly attended by representatives from Argentina, Brazil, Canada, Chile, Colombia, Costa Rica, Guatemala, Guyana, Honduras, Jamaica, Mexico, Panama, Paraguay, Peru and Saint Lucia.

== Canada's foreign relations with Latin American countries ==
Country	Formal relations began	Notes
Argentina	14 November 1940	See Argentina–Canada relations: Argentina has an embassy in Ottawa.; Canada has an embassy in Buenos Aires.
Bolivia	May 1961	See Bolivia–Canada relations: Bolivia has an embassy in Ottawa.; Canada has an embassy in La Paz.
Brazil	14 November 1940	See Brazil–Canada relations: Brazil has an embassy in Ottawa.; Canada has an embassy in Brasília.
Chile	9 October 1941	See Canada–Chile relations: Canada has an embassy in Santiago.; Chile has an embassy in Ottawa.
Colombia	6 November 1952	See Canada–Colombia relations: Canada has an embassy in Bogotá.; Colombia has an embassy in Ottawa.
Costa Rica	20 January 1961	See Canada–Costa Rica relations: Canada has an embassy in San José.; Costa Rica has an embassy in Ottawa.
Cuba	16 March 1945	See Canada–Cuba relations: Canada has an embassy in Havana.; Cuba has an embassy in Ottawa.
Dominican Republic	22 April 1954	See Canada–Dominican Republic relations: Canada has an embassy in Santo Domingo.; Dominican Republic has an embassy in Ottawa.
Ecuador	March 1961	See Canada–Ecuador relations: Canada has an embassy in Quito.; Ecuador has an embassy in Ottawa.
El Salvador	29 December 1961	See Canada–El Salvador relations: Canada has an embassy in San Salvador.; El Salvador has an embassy in Ottawa.
Guatemala	16 September 1961	See Canada–Guatemala relations: Canada has an embassy in Guatemala City.; Guatemala has an embassy in Ottawa.
Honduras	June 1961	See Canada–Honduras relations: Canada does not have a full embassy in Tegucigalpa but does maintain an Office of the Embassy in Tegucigalpa. Canada is also accredited to Honduras from its embassy in San José, Costa Rica.; Honduras has an embassy in Ottawa.
Mexico	30 January 1944	See Canada–Mexico relations: Canada has an embassy in Mexico City.; Mexico has an embassy in Ottawa.
Nicaragua	June 1961	See Canada–Nicaragua relations: Canada does not have an embassy in Managua but is accredited to Nicaragua from its embassy in San José, Costa Rica.; Nicaragua does not have an embassy in Ottawa but is accredited to Canada from its embassy in Washington, D.C., United States.
Panama	11 August 1961	See Canada–Panama relations: Canada has an embassy in Panama City.; Panama has an embassy in Ottawa.
Paraguay	5 February 1961	See Canada–Paraguay relations: Canada does not have an embassy in Asunción but is accredited to Paraguay from its embassy in Buenos Aires, Argentina. Canado also maintains an honorary consul in Asunción.; Paraguay has an embassy in Ottawa.
Peru	30 January 1944	See Canada–Peru relations: Canada has an embassy in Lima.; Peru has an embassy in Ottawa.
Puerto Rico	18 February 1927 (Canada–United States relations established)	See Canada–Puerto Rico relations: Puerto Rico is a territory of the United States which handles Puerto Rico's foreign relations. Diplomatic relations between Canada and the United States were established on 18 February 1927.; Canada does not have an embassy in San Juan but does have an embassy in Washington, D.C.; Puerto Rico does not have an embassy in Ottawa but the United States has an embassy in Ottawa.
Uruguay	27 February 1951	See Canada–Uruguay relations: Canada has an embassy in Montevideo.; Uruguay has an embassy in Ottawa.
Venezuela	22 November 1952	See Canada–Venezuela relations: Canada has an embassy in Caracas but operations are currently suspended since June 2019. Canada is accredited to Venezuela from its embassy in Bogotá, Colombia.; Venezuela has an embassy in Ottawa.

== See also ==
- Canada–Central American Four Free Trade Agreement
- Canadian mining in Latin America and the Caribbean

== Additional sources ==
- Daudelin, Jean. "Canada and the Americas: a Time for Modesty". Behind the Headlines 64.3. Canadian Institute of International Affairs (2007).
- Haar, Jerry and Edgar J. Dosman eds. "A Dynamic Partnership: Canada's Changing Role in the Americas". Miami: Transaction Publishers, 1993.
- McKenna, Peter. "Canada and the OAS". Ottawa: Carlton University Press, 1995.
- Ogelsby, J.C.M., "Gringos from the Far North, Essays in the History of Canadian-Latin American relations, 1866-1968", Macmillan, 1976.
- Rochlin, James. "Discovering the Americas: The Evolution of Canadian Foreign Policy Towards Latin America". Vancouver: UBC Press, 1994.
- Stevenson, Brian J.R. "Canada, Latin America, and the New Internationalism: A Foreign Policy Analysis, 1968-1990". Kingston: McGill-Queen's University Press, 2000.
- Tijerina, S,"One Cinderblock at a Time: Historiography of Canadian-Latin American Relations, Canadian-Colombian Relations," Desafios(Bogota), Semestre I, 2012, pp275–292.
