= Pancreatitis (disambiguation) =

Pancreatitis is a medical condition characterized by inflammation of the pancreas. It may also refer to:

- Pancreatitis (veterinary), medical condition
- Pancreatitis (book), 1966 book by T. T. White
- Pancreatitis: Medical and Surgical Management, 2017 Wiley-Blackwell book
