= David Adam =

David Adam may refer to:

- David Adam (priest) (1936–2020), English minister and canon of York Minster
- David Adam (diplomat) (born 1941), Canadian diplomat
- David Stow Adam (1859–1925), Scottish minister and professor

== See also ==
- David Adams (disambiguation)
