= Canada–Cuba relations =

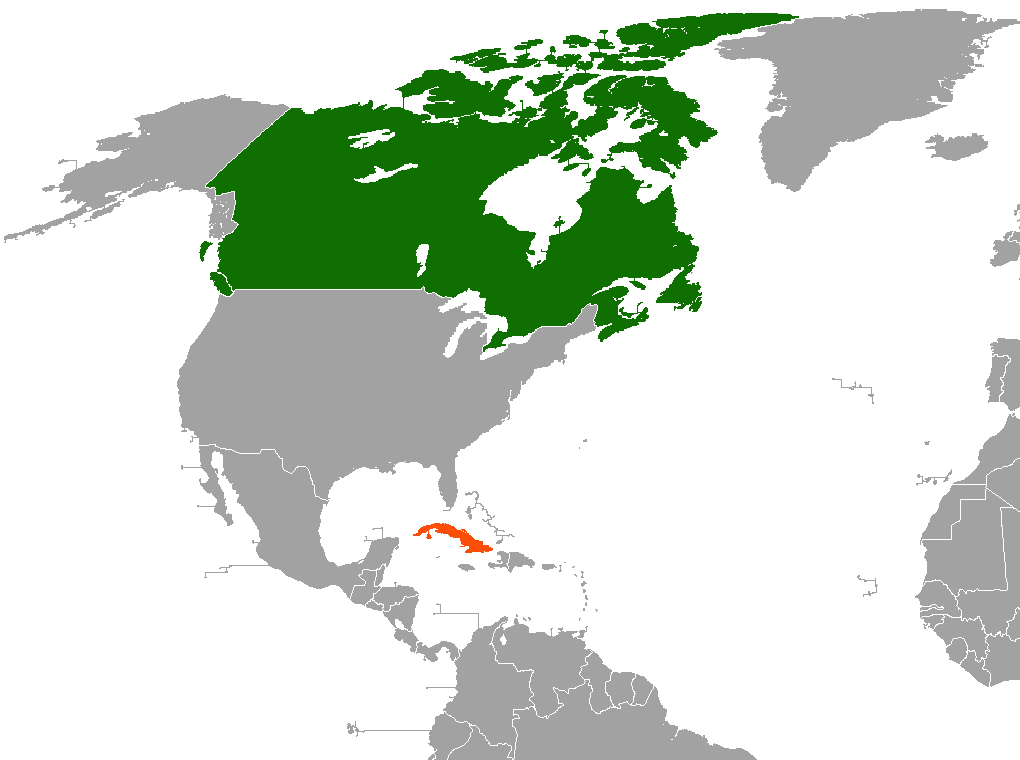

- Canada: Cuba

Diplomatic mission
- Canadian Embassy, Havana: Cuban Embassy, Ottawa

Envoy
- Ambassador Perry Calderwood: Ambassador Josefina Vidal

Canada and Cuba have established diplomatic relations with one another since 1945, following their centuries-old informal trading relationship. Informal trade relations were established between the colonies of Atlantic Canada and the Captaincy General of Cuba during the 18th century. The informal trade relationship continued into the 20th century until formal diplomatic relations was finally established.

Diplomatic relations between the two countries remain uninterrupted since its establishment, with Canada being one of only two countries in the Americas that did not sever relations with Cuba after the Cuban Revolution in 1959. (Note: In addition to Canada, Mexico was the only other sovereign state in the Americas to not sever ties with Cuba.) Relations between Canada and Cuba have occasionally been a source of contention for Canada–United States relations.

Both countries maintain embassies in the other's capital city, in addition to consulates in other cities. The two countries also share a significant trading relationship with Cuba serving as Canada's second-largest export partner in the Caribbean/Central American region, and Canada serving as Cuba's third largest export market.

== History ==
Trade relations between Canada and Cuba date back to the 18th century, with vessels from Atlantic Canada trading cod and beer for rum and sugar in Cuba. After the United States terminated the Canadian–American Reciprocity Treaty in 1866, the governments of British North America sent trade missions throughout Latin America, including Cuba. The trade mission arrived in Cuba on 17 March 1866. Other attempts to open Cuba's markets to Canadian exports were made in 1876, although Spanish, British, and later U.S. economic interests prevented Canada from fulfilling that objective.

After the Spanish–American War and the handover of Cuba from Spain to the U.S., the United States Military Government in Cuba passed a series of decrees that permitted the chartering of foreign banks there. Canadian chartered banks, like the Royal Bank of Canada and the Bank of Nova Scotia, acted on these changes quickly and established a presence in Cuba.

=== 20th century ===
The Republic of Cuba opened its first diplomatic offices in Canada in 1903, in Yarmouth, Nova Scotia; to promote salt cod and rum trade between the two countries. In 1909, the Canadian government opened a commercial office in Havana. In 1931, the Cuban government established a consulate in Montreal.

Canadian financial institutions saw significant growth in their investments during the early 20th century, with the Royal Bank of Canada owning 16 sugar mills and 120 hectares (300 acres) of fertile growing land for sugar cane in 1923. By 1958, more than 70 per cent of all life insurance policies held by Cuban nationals were underwritten by Canadian financial institutions, including Confederation Life and Sun Life Financial.

In 1942, Cuban president Fulgencio Batista announced his intentions to formally establish diplomatic relations with Canada and the Soviet Union. Diplomatic relations were formally established between the two countries in 16 March 1945. Cuba was the first country in the Caribbean selected by Canada for a diplomatic mission.

==== Post-Cuban Revolution ====
Canada formally announced its recognition of the new Cuban government on 8 January 1959, the day the rebel army entered Havana. Although some Canadian officials expressed concern about the revolutionary tribunals taking place, the Canadian government maintained a policy of non-interference with Cuba. Diplomatic relations between Canada and Cuba remained uninterrupted in the aftermath of the Cuban Revolution, and is one of only two countries in the Americas, alongside Mexico, that maintained uninterrupted relations with Cuba after the revolution. John Diefenbaker, the Prime Minister of Canada, was a staunch anti-communist, however, he maintained that relations could be continued "despite the philosophical differences between [Cuba's] communist regime and the West..., and that Canada should hardly be required to tighten its trade restrictions above and beyond those of other Latin American nations." Although Canada maintained relations with the new Cuban government, the Canadian government's reaction to early Cuban attempts to improve relations were cold and cautious.

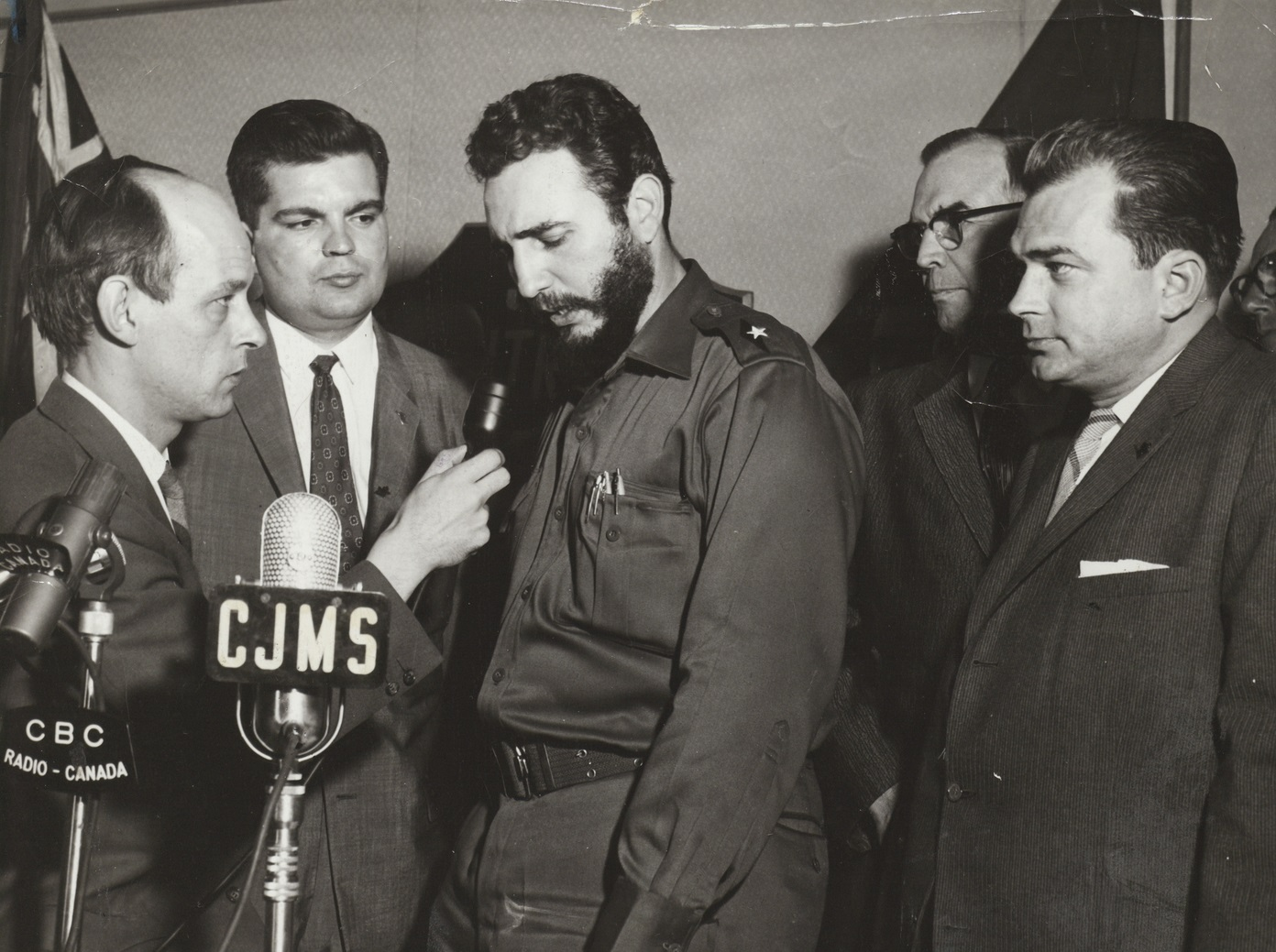
CBC/Radio-Canada's journalist and future Premier of Quebec, René Lévesque, interviews Fidel Castro during his trip to Montreal in late April 1959.

In February 1959, the Cuban government requested ten Royal Canadian Mounted Police members to assist them in training Cuba's police and internal security services. On 26 April 1959, the Prime Minister of Cuba, Fidel Castro, (Note: Castro governed Cuba as the Prime Minister of the country from 1959 to 1976. He governed the country as the President of the Council of State from 1976 to 2008.) visited Montreal to participate in a toy drive for Cuban children. Representatives from the Royal Bank of Canada and Sun Line Financial also met with Castro during the event. In addition to inviting Castro, the event's organizers, the Junior Chamber of Commerce of Montreal, also invited several members of the Canadian government to greet Castro, although those contacted refused to do so.

After the U.S. instituted economic sanctions against Cuba, the Cuban government looked at Canada as an alternate trading partner for raw materials, machinery, parts and other supplies traditionally sourced from the United States. As a result, Canadian businesses fared much better than other foreign entities with regard to nationalization in Cuba. In banking, 23 branches of the Royal Bank of Canada and eight branches of Scotiabank were the only banking establishments exempted from the Cuban government's nationalization efforts in October 1960. A Cuban commercial mission was formally dispatched to Canada in December 1960.

Continued trade with Cuba also fell in line with policies pursued by the Diefenbaker government; expanding Canada's trade relations to include members of the Soviet Bloc and mainland China; as well as promoting the idea that Canada's foreign policy was not mirroring the foreign policy of the United States. In light of the U.S. embargo, the Canadian government also believed "it was up to countries like Canada and the United Kingdom to do what they could to maintain the links with Havana," and prevent the U.S. from driving Cuba completely into the Soviet camp. On 23 December 1960, Diefenbaker outlined the Canadian government's policy of trade with Cuba. The policy made clear that Canada would limit the trade of arms and other related equipment of strategic significance, although they would not limit trading non-strategic goods.

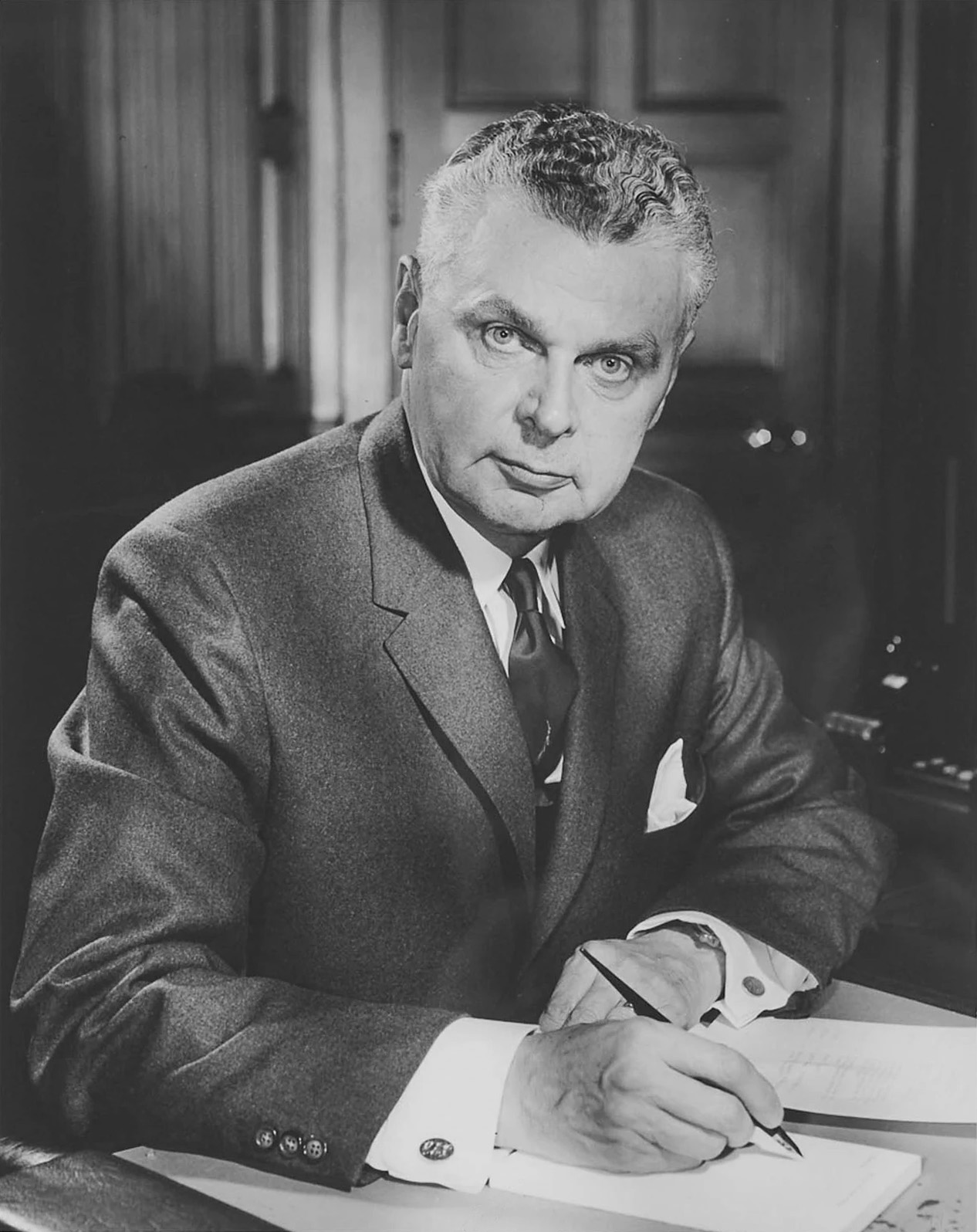
John Diefenbaker, Prime Minister of Canada, decided to maintain relations and continue trade with Cuba after the Cuban Revolution.

The choice to maintain relations with the revolutionary Cuban government served as a point of contention for Canada-U.S. relations in the decades following the Cuban Revolution. Canada saw significant pressure to end cordial relations with the Cuban government, especially after the Cuban commercial mission was warmly received in December 1960. To safeguard Canada-Cuba relations, the Cuban ambassador to Canada, Americo Cruz, informed the Cuban government to not "show off our good relations," to help alleviate U.S. diplomatic pressure against Canada. From January 1962, the Kennedy administration began to re-open the issue of isolating Cuba and internationalizing the embargo with Canadian officials and other NATO allies. The Canadian government looked to other NATO and American allies for support over its Cuban policy, in relation to the United States.

Although the Canadian government supported continued trade with Cuba, it did not provide the Cuban government with much political support. The Canadian government's response was muted after the Bay of Pigs Invasion. Although it acknowledged the invasion was financed by the United States, the Canadian government refused to condemn the U.S. for its role in the invasion; having instead informed the Cuban ambassador it had "not done enough to improve its relations with the United States," and that it believed they needed to "reach an agreement with the United States to save the Revolution." Cruz had found the Canadian government's reaction to the invasion and its subsequent denial of humanitarian aid eyeopening, as it revealed to him that the Cuban government could not expect much political support from Canada.

==== Cuban Missile Crisis ====
Canada played a minor role in the Cuban Missile Crisis, with the Royal Canadian Navy assisting the United States, and other NATO allies in searching the North Atlantic Ocean for Soviet vessels from 24 October to the end of the crisis. The Canadian government also provided the United States intelligence on Cuba, with Canadian diplomats having collected intelligence on military installations and other strategic elements. Canadian diplomats were dispatched to confirm the installation of missiles in Cuba in October 1962.

However, Diefenbaker's desire to maintain an independent foreign policy from the United States during the Cuban Missile Crisis contributed towards his defeat in the 1963 Canadian federal election. Prior to making a public televised announcement regarding the Cuban quarantine on 22 October 1962, Kennedy had called Diefenbaker to inform him about the plan, and to request Canadian Forces be placed on DEFCON-3. Diefenbaker in turn was angered that his government was not consulted earlier and questioned Kennedy for further proof, and to first send a United Nations team to confirm it. The issue led to a two-day debate in Diefenbaker's cabinet, with Minister of National Defence Douglas Harkness advocating that Canada follow the United States in raising its military readiness, given their "obligations" as members of NATO and NORAD.

Harkness's position eventually gained the support from Diefenbaker's cabinet as Soviet ships approached the American quarantine zone, and other NATO members began to voice their support for the United States. DEFCON-3 was formally authorized by Diefenbaker on 24 October.

Diefenbaker's public perception in Canada suffered from the crisis, with the Canadian public viewing Diefenbaker as indecisive. The perception as an indecisive leader, and his refusal to accept nuclear-armed CIM-10 Bomarc missiles, led to his eventual defeat to Lester B. Pearson's Liberal Party of Canada in the 1963 election. Despite Diefenbaker’s defeat, the parameters of Canadian foreign policy toward the island have been largely bipartisan into the 21st century.

==== Post-Cuban Missile Crisis ====
Although Diefenbaker was defeated in the 1963 election, his policy with Cuba was continued by the Liberal Party most notably during Pierre Trudeau's tenure as prime minister, who long held the opinion that Canada needed to establish a foreign policy, "independent of American influence". The Canadian government was critical of the United States embargo against Cuba during the 1960s and 1970s, objecting to American attempts to block trade to Cuba by Canadian-based American subsidiaries.

However, Canadian diplomats also conducted intelligence-gathering missions in Cuba on behalf of the United States. The intelligence-sharing arrangement was formalized after Kennedy met Pearson at a summit in Hyannis Port, Massachusetts, and asked whether the Canadian government would abet U.S. intelligence-gathering efforts in Cuba. These activities included monitoring Soviet compliance to withdraw its missiles, and surveilling the Soviet's continued informal presence in Cuba. This intelligence-gathering arrangement continued for several years into Trudeau's tenure as Canada's prime minister.

In 1975, the United States passed legislation that loosened the restrictions of its embargo, permitting Canadian and other foreign subsidiaries of American-based companies to conduct trade with Cuba.

In 1976, Trudeau spent three days in Cuba and sparked a personal friendship with Castro. The visit was also the first by a Western nation to Cuba since 1960. Trudeau's trip to Cuba was criticized by Diefenbaker, given Cuba's involvement in the Angolan Civil War. Remarks made by Trudeau in Cuba, notably "Viva Cuba! Viva Fidel Castro," was also criticized by Diefenbaker, and Thomas Cossitt, a Canadian Member of Parliament. In his memoirs, Trudeau noted that Castro downplayed Cuba's involvement in Angola during his visit, and he had only realized the extent of Cuba's involvement after returning to Ottawa. Shortly after his visit to Cuba, Trudeau cut foreign aid to Cuba.

In January 1977, Canadian-Cuban relations were strained after details were made public that the Cuban government used a consular mission in Montreal for intelligence-gathering purposes. However, the consulate had been under surveillance by Canadian law enforcement as early as 1972, with Canadian authorities already aware of the Cuban mission's ulterior uses for the building. Although Canadian authorities monitored the Cuban consulate, authorities did not take any action against consulate officials until 1977, when details of Cuban espionage were disclosed to the public, forcing authorities to act and expel them from the country. Five Cuban nationals were expelled from Canada, including three diplomats. In a statement of admission, the Cuban government stated it used the consulate in Montreal for intelligence gathering, although noted its activities were directed against Cuba's "enemies," including the United States government and the CIA.

In 1984, the Canadian government passed the Foreign Extraterritorial Measures Act, a law designed to dissuade Canadian-based American subsidiaries from taking part in the American economic embargo of Cuba.

==== 1990s ====
In 1994, a joint venture was formed between the Cuban Nickel Union and the Canadian firm Sherritt International, which operates a mining and processing plant on the island in Moa. A second enterprise, Cobalt Refinery Co. Inc., was created in Alberta for nickel refining.

Canada, in addition to the European Union, objected to the passage of the Helms-Burton Act in the U.S. Congress in 1996, specifically Title III, a provision that permitted Americans whose properties were nationalized by the Cuban government, to sue individuals that are presently using it. The Canadian Minister of Foreign Affairs Lloyd Axworthy stated "Canada shares the U.S. objectives of improving human rights standards and moving to more representative government in Cuba. But we are concerned that the Helms-Burton Act takes the wrong approach. That is why we have been working with other countries to uphold the principles of international law".

In response to the Helms-Burton Act, the Foreign Extraterritorial Measures Act was amended to permit Canadians sued under the Helms-Burton Act, to counter-sue in Canadian courts. The resulting amendment also found those that paid damages under the Helms-Burton Act to be liable to fines and imprisonment in Canada. In a satirical response to the Helms-Burton Act, a private member's bill known as the Godfrey-Milliken Bill was introduced in the House of Commons of Canada in response to the extraterritoriality of the Helms-Burton Act. The proposed bill would have allowed descendants of United Empire Loyalists who fled the American Revolution to be able to reclaim land and property that was confiscated by the American government in the 1700s. Although the Helms-Burton Act went into effect in 1996, enactment of Title III was postponed until April 2019.

During the mid-1990s, Canada and Cuba reached an agreement that saw the Cuban government compensate Canadians whose properties were expropriated after the Cuban Revolution. Emergency economic reforms made during the Special Period in Cuba, allowed for a significant number of Canadian businesses to invest in Cuba. Increased economic activity between the two countries prompted a 41-hour official visit to Havana by Canadian Prime Minister Jean Chrétien in November 1998. In the months prior to his arrival to Cuba, U.S. President Bill Clinton urged Chrétien to raise concerns about human rights to Castro for his planned visit to Cuba at the 24th G8 summit. Chrétien faced some criticism from the Canadian public for not publicly voicing his concerns over human rights in Cuba, although he privately discussed the issue with Castro, as well as demanded the release of four specific political dissidents. However, the resulting discussion resulted in a "chill" in relations between the two leaders, with Cuban officials rebuffing Chrétien's efforts to free the political dissidents.

Castro travelled to Montreal in 2000 to serve as one of Trudeau's pallbearers at his funeral.

=== 21st century ===
In 2001, the Canadian government protested American preclearance customs agents in Canadian airports who tried to catch American citizens travelling to Cuba in defiance of U.S. law. In April 2009, Canadian Prime Minister Stephen Harper expressed support for the U.S. government's decision to lift Cuban-American travel and remittance to Cuba.

During the 2010 United Nations Security Council election, Cuban diplomats to the United Nations lobbied Latin American ambassadors to the United Nations General Assembly to vote for Canada.

In 2013, the Canadian government hosted bilateral talks between the governments of Cuba and the United States. Seven negotiation sessions were held between the American and Cuban governments in Ottawa and Toronto. The following negotiations resulted in the Cuban thaw.

In November 2016, Canadian Prime Minister Justin Trudeau, made a 30-hour official visit to Cuba. Trudeau was unable to meet with Castro, as he was too ill to receive him.

==== Cuban Canadian opposition and pro-democracy activism ====
Cuban Canadian organizations and activists have advocated for democratic change and human rights in Cuba and have criticized Canada's policy of constructive engagement with the Cuban government.

The Cuban Canadian Foundation, which represented members of the Cuban exile community, advocated for a transition to democracy in Cuba and appeared before Canadian parliamentary committees examining human rights in Cuba in 2005 and 2007. In 2007, Nelson Taylor Sol, director of the Cuban Canadian Foundation's Ottawa delegation, criticized Canada’s policy of "constructive engagement" with Cuba, arguing that it placed insufficient pressure on the government over human rights and that continued economic ties undermined efforts to secure greater political freedoms. Following Fidel Castro’s death in 2016, Taylor criticized Trudeau's statement on Castro, describing the Castro era as a period in which Cubans lacked freedom of expression and thought.

In 2021, a group identifying itself as "Cuban Canadians for Patria y Vida" expressed support for Cuba's pro-democracy movement and called for democracy, inclusion, freedom, and human rights in Cuba.

In 2026, the Cuban Canadians Coalition appeared before the House of Commons Standing Committee on Foreign Affairs and International Development as part of its study of the humanitarian crisis in Cuba. Its public relations director, Kirenia Carbonell, criticized the Cuban government's repression and said that responsibility for Cuba's transition to democracy rested with Cubans both on the island and in the diaspora.

==== 2026 US fuel blockage of Cuba ====
In early 2026, following a U.S. naval blockade that cut off most fuel supplies to Cuba, including from Venezuela after a military operation that captured its leader, along with subsequent U.S. threats of tariffs on countries supplying oil to the island, Cuba faced a severe energy crisis marked by widespread blackouts, food shortages, and rationing.

As a result of fuel shortage, Air Canada suspended all flights to Cuba in February 2026, with its remaining flights flying only to repatriate Canadian passengers already on the island. Other Canadian carriers, including WestJet and Air Transat soon followed with suspensions or orderly wind-downs of service. Flights and vacation packages to Cuba by the three airlines were halted indefinitely in June 2026, amid ongoing shortages of food, fuel, and electricity.

In response to the fuel blockade launched by the US, Canada announced in February 2026 that it would provide $8 million in food aid, channelled through United Nations agencies such as the World Food Programme and UNICEF rather than the Cuban government. Officials emphasized a focus on humanitarian needs while declining to send fuel shipments. An additional C$5.5 million in international assistance was later announced by the Canadian government in April 2026.

A March 2026 Angus Reid Institute poll found that 51 per cent of Canadians supported providing aid to Cuba despite the risk of tensions with the United States, while 31 per cent prioritized maintaining positive relations with the Trump administration. In the same poll, 34 per cent of respondents found the $8 million in aid sufficient, 32 per cent favoured providing more aid, and 19 per cent preferred providing less or no aid aid. A separate Nanos Research survey found that 54 per cent of Canadians wanted Canada to encourage the US to ease energy restrictions on Cuba.

Each year since 1992, the United Nations General Assembly has adopted a non-binding resolution calling for an end to the United States embargo against Cuba. Canada has consistently voted in favour of the resolution, most recently in October 2025, despite a slight decline in support among other countries. However, in July 2026, Canada abstained from a separate vote on whether to hold a debate on the blockade, alongside several of Cuba's traditional supporters. The vote was described by Agence France-Presse as a potential signal of further erosion in international support for Cuba's position on the blockade.

== Economic relations ==
Canada has generally been Cuba's fourth largest trading partner. As of May 2018, Cuba is presently Canada's second largest export market in the Caribbean/Central American region; with bilateral trade between the two countries averaging approximately C$1 billion annually. In 2000, Canada was Cuba's second-largest merchandise trading partner after Spain. However, by 2009, Canada had become Cuba's fourth largest merchandise trading partner after Venezuela, China, and Spain. Canada remained Cuba's third largest export market after Venezuela and China, and the eighth largest source of imported goods to Cuba in 2009; with declining Canadian imports in the late-2000s attributed to Cuba's loss of purchasing power after the Cuban government implemented austerity measures. Canada primarily supplies Cuba with agricultural goods; and equipment for energy generation, mining, telecommunications, and transportation. Nickel accounts for the majority of Cuban imports to Canada, although cigars, frozen lobsters, and rum are also imported from Cuba.

The size of the trade market between Canada and Cuba has attracted major Canadian investments to Cuba. Canada is one of Cuba's largest foreign direct investors, with Canadian businesses forming 26 joint-venture economic associations within Cuba in 2008. In 2010, there were 15 joint ventures in Cuba involving Canadian businesses; with Canadian businesses holding the second largest number of joint-venture agreements in Cuba after companies based in Spain. Canadian businesses in Cuba are largely invested in mining, power, oil and gas, agri-food, and the tourism industry. Sherritt International, a Canadian natural resource company is the largest investor in Cuba, with a diversified portfolio in agriculture, energy, mining, and oil production. Canadian businesses have arguably been able to benefit from the US-embargo of Cuba, with Canadian companies that operate in Cuba facing no direct competition from their US counterparts. However, the US-embargo has limited the number of Canadian companies operating in Cuba, with Canadian businesses that have a large presence in the US being unable to operate in Cuba without risk of conflicting with the Helms-Burton Act.

=== Economic aid ===
Canada funds international development programs to strengthen Cuba's agricultural sector, and improve food security in the country. In addition to the agricultural sector, the Canadian assistance program includes funding for technical training and certification for workers in oil and gas, petrochemical exploration, power engineering, pipefitting, and renewable energy industries. Funding was also provided for the training of auditors to solidify "greater transparency and accountability," in Cuban government agencies and state-run enterprises.

Between 1994 and 2010, the Canadian government has invested C$136 million of foreign aid into development projects and initiatives in Cuba.

=== Tourism ===
Canada is historically Cuba's largest source market for international tourism, accounting for 30 to 40 per cent of all foreign visitors to the island annually. Before the COVID-19 pandemic, over 1 million Canadians visited Cuba each year, contributing approximately C$780 million to the Cuban economy.

In early 2026, the sector experienced severe disruption when major Canadian carriers, including Air Canada, WestJet, Sunwing Vacations, and Air Transat suspended service and package operations to the island. The flight halts were triggered by a major energy crisis in Cuba, brought on by an intensified United States oil blockade that disrupted fuel imports from key suppliers like Venezuela and Mexico. As Cuban authorities issued advisories regarding critical jet fuel shortages across major national airports, Canadian airlines dispatched empty aircraft to repatriate thousands of stranded vacationers, while Global Affairs Canada updated its travel advisory to warn against non-essential travel to the country.

Despite periodic fluctuations, Cuba remains one of the top overall overseas travel destinations for Canadians. A number of cultural and university exchange programs also exist between the two countries, with Canadian universities holding the largest number of non-Spanish-speaking university exchange programs in Cuba.

== Diplomatic missions ==
=== Canadian mission to Cuba ===
Canada has an embassy in Havana and consulates in Varadero and Holguin. The mission also provides consular assistance to Australian and Israeli nationals. Although Canada maintains diplomatic representation in Cuba, its embassy does not directly fund or facilitate any cultural or interpersonal exchange programs between the two countries.

The Canadian mission in Havana was first established in 1945, although it relocated to its current chancery, a building constructed in the late 1920s, in 1961 under a lease agreement with the Cuban government.

=== Cuban mission to Canada ===
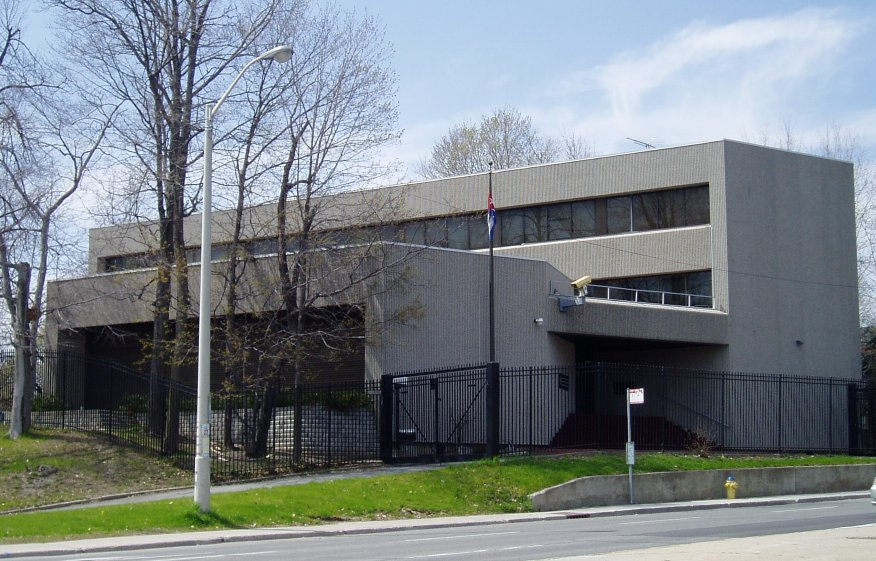
The Cuban embassy in Ottawa.

Cuba has an embassy in Ottawa and consulates in Montreal and Toronto. The Cuban embassy in Ottawa provides full consular services to the public in addition to fulfilling diplomatic, commercial, and economic functions, while the consulates in Montreal and Toronto house offices of Cuba's Tourism Board.

The Cuban mission's chancery in Ottawa was initially located on Island Park Drive. Due to multiple bombings and threats by US-based anti-Castro groups during the 1960s and 1970s, the mission relocated several times before it moved onto land purchased in 1974. The compound is divided between public offices and private residences, although not all staff members live on the premises.

== See also ==
- Canada–Caribbean relations
- Canada–Latin America relations
- Foreign relations of Canada
- Foreign relations of Cuba
