= Canada–Chile relations =

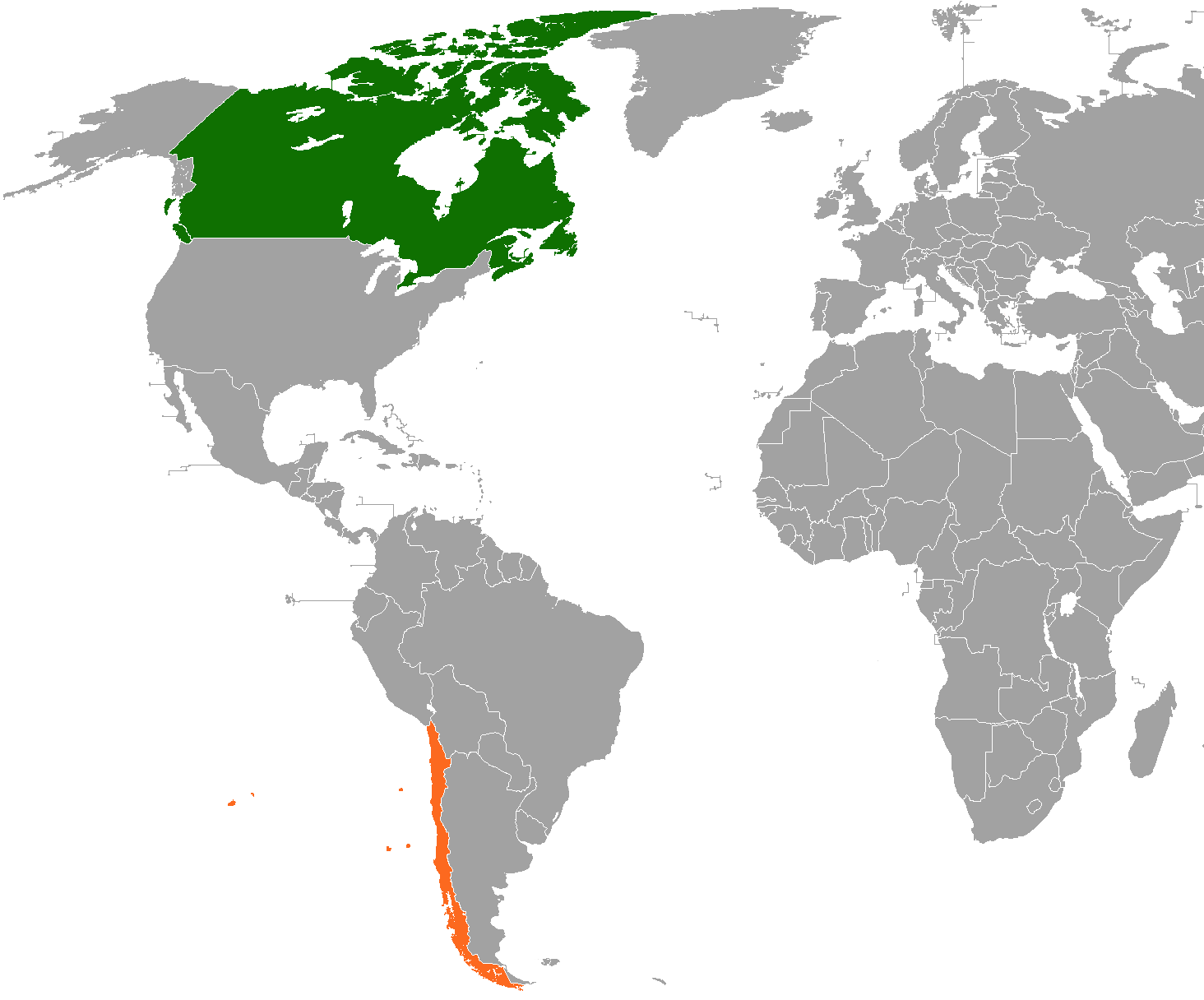

- Canada: Chile

Canada and Chile established diplomatic relations in 1892. Both nations are members of the Asia-Pacific Economic Cooperation, Cairns Group, Organization of American States, and the Organisation for Economic Co-operation and Development.

== History ==
In 1818, Chile declared its independence from Spain and their independence was recognized in 1844. In 1892, Chile opened a consulate in the Canadian city of Vancouver due to the presence of Chilean sailors in the city. Chile would continue to open consulates in other Canadian cities such as in Quebec City (1885), Brantford (1907) and in Montreal (1923). At the time, Canada did not have a diplomatic presence in Chile as it was still part of the British Empire and all of its international affairs were conducted via London. Canada assumed full control of it diplomatic relations after the passing of the Statute of Westminster in 1931.

During World War II, Canada began to establish diplomatic relations with Latin American nations. In 1941, a Canadian commercial mission headed to Chile and signed a commercial treaty. Chile, a member of the ABC countries (which also included Argentina and Brazil) was seen as an important member nation within the region and Canada established diplomatic relations with Chile in 1941. In July 1942, Chile opened a diplomatic legation office in Ottawa. That same year, Canada also opened a legation office in Santiago. In June 1944, both nations upgraded their legation offices to embassies, respectively.

On 11 September 1973, democratically elected Chilean President Salvador Allende was removed from power in a coup d'état by General Augusto Pinochet. Soon after the coup, several Chilean nationals fled to the Canadian embassy in Santiago for asylum. Canadian first secretary Marc Dolgin and David Adam allowed entry to the Chilean asylees and housed them at the embassy and at the Canadian ambassador's residence (at the time, the ambassador was in Argentina). Some 16 people were admitted to the embassy. After a month of hosting the Chileans, Canada (and the Chilean government) allowed for all 16 people to be sent to Canada for resettlement. From 1973 to 1990, Canada would receive approximately 7,000 Chilean nationals as refugees.

In 2016, both nations celebrated 75 years of diplomatic relations. Air Canada operates direct flights between Toronto and Santiago.

In June 2022, Chilean President Gabriel Boric paid a visit to Canada and met with Prime Minister Justin Trudeau in what was described by CTV News as a wide-ranging bilateral meeting.

== High-level visits ==
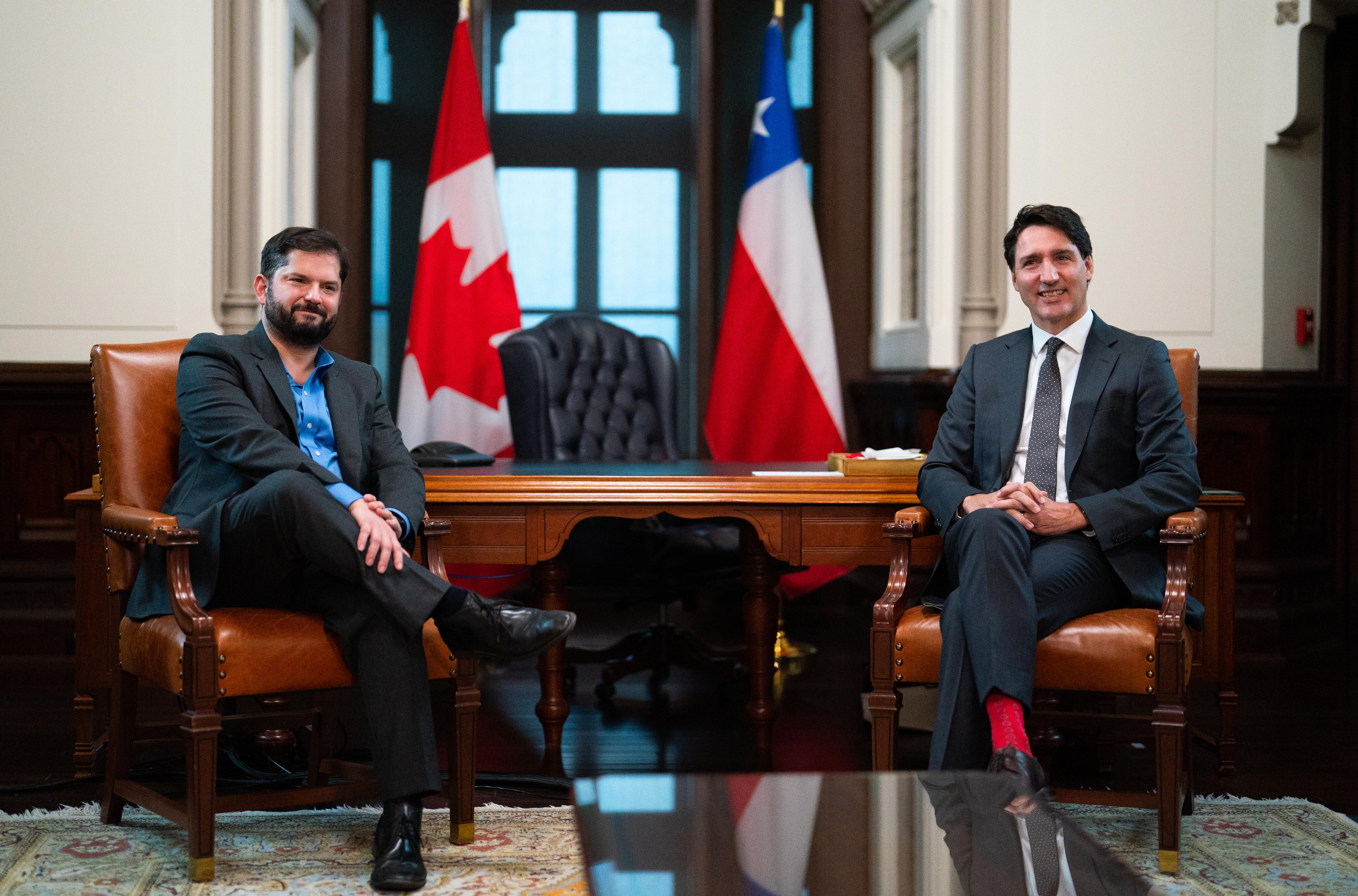
Canadian Prime Minister Justin Trudeau and Chilean President Gabriel Boric in Ottawa; June 2022.

Prime Ministerial visits from Canada to Chile

- Prime Minister Jean Chrétien (1998)
- Prime Minister Paul Martin (2004)
- Prime Minister Stephen Harper (2012)

Presidential visits from Chile to Canada

- President Eduardo Frei Ruiz-Tagle (1997)
- President Michelle Bachelet (2008)
- President Sebastián Piñera (2013)
- President Gabriel Boric (2022)

== Trade ==
In 1996, Canada and Chile signed a free trade agreement. In 2017, trade between Canada and Chile totaled $2.9 billion Canadian dollars. Canada's exports to Chile include: machinery, chemicals, cereals fats and oils, and mineral products. Chile's exports to Canada include: copper, precious stones and metals (mostly gold and silver), fruits, fish and seafood (salmon), and beverages (wine). According to Chile's Central Bank, in 2022, Canada had U$ 36 billion worth of investments (stock) and is the largest investor in Chile above the United States, Netherlands, United Kingdom and Spain. Canadian multinational companies such as Barrick Gold and Scotiabank invest in Chile. Chilean wines can be found throughout Canada.

== Resident diplomatic missions ==
- Canada has an embassy in Santiago.
- Chile has an embassy in Ottawa and consulates-general in Montreal, Toronto and Vancouver.
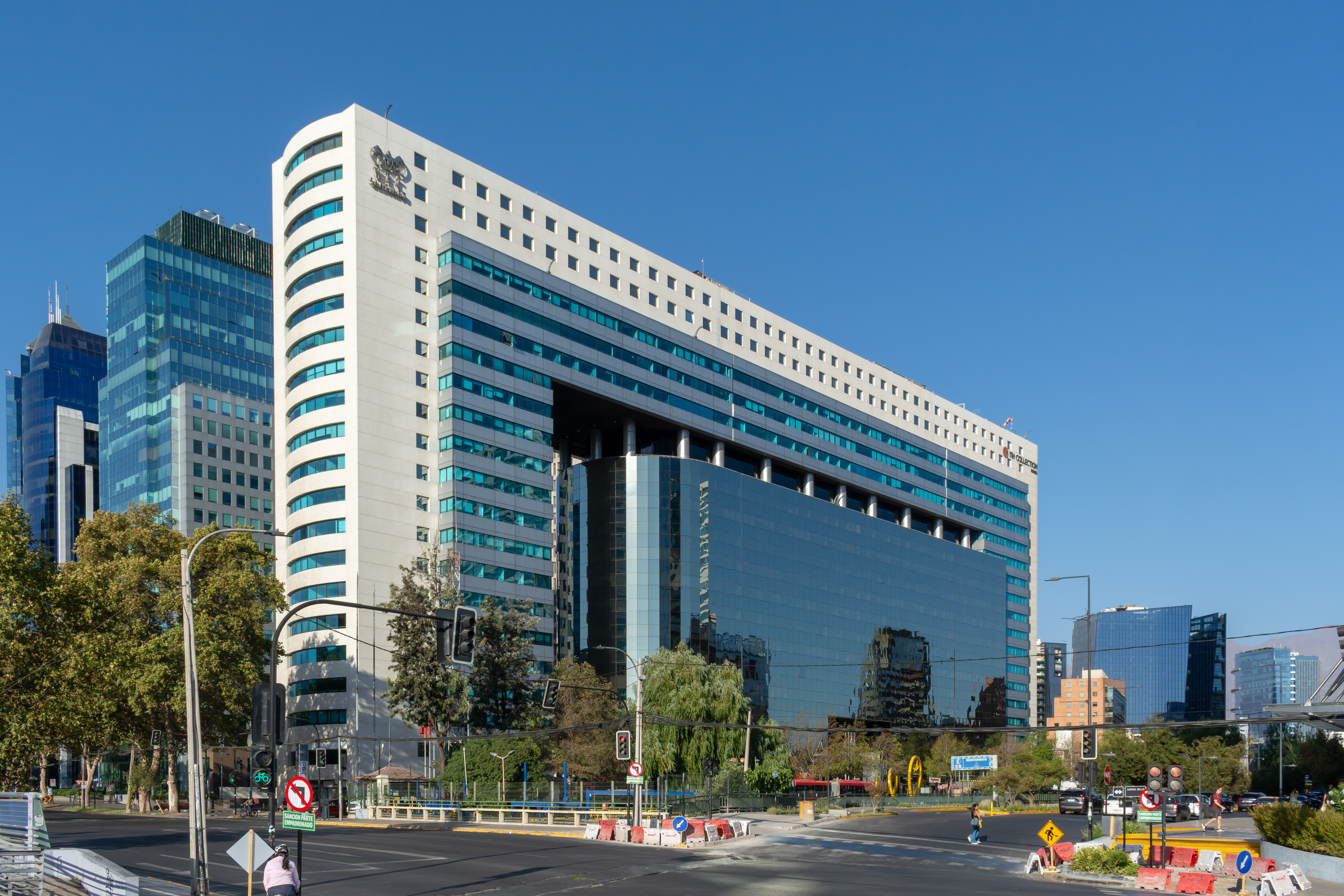
Building hosting the Embassy of Canada in Santiago

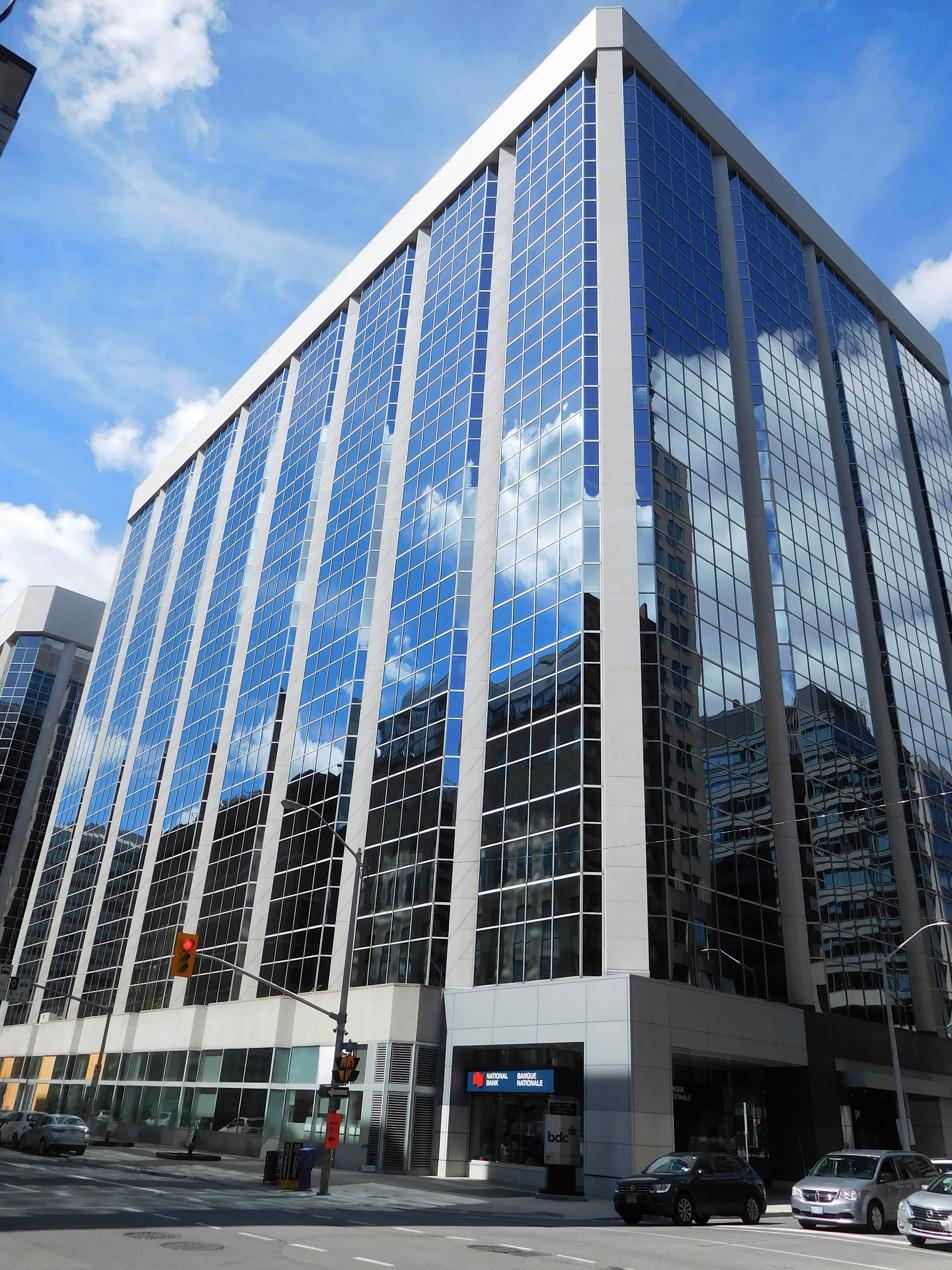
Building hosting the Embassy of Chile in Ottawa

== See also ==
- Chilean Canadians
- Canada–Chile Free Trade Agreement
