= Canada–Chile Free Trade Agreement =

1996 trade agreement

Canada–Chile Free Trade Agreement (CCFTA) is a trade agreement between Canada and Chile. It was signed on December 5, 1996, in Santiago, Chile and came into effect on July 5, 1997. Tariffs on 75 percent of bilateral trade were immediately eliminated. It was Canada's first free trade agreement with a Latin American nation (other than Mexico), and was Chile's first full free trade agreement. Over the first decade, trade between Canada and Chile increased more than 300%, with the trade of goods rising from $718 million in 1996 to $2.7 billion in 2010. Bilateral service trade increased to $164 million by 2005. Canadian investments in Chile reached $13.3 billion in 2010, and Canada has been the largest source of new investment in Chile.

In 2012, Canadian prime minister Stephen Harper and Chilean president Sebastián Piñera announced the expansion to the CCFTA, with a financial services chapter in which Canadian financial institutions will enjoy preferential access to the Chilean market and can compete on a level playing field vis-à-vis their competitors. This financial services chapter came into effect in October 2013.

In 2015, Prime Minister Justin Trudeau tasked his Minister of International Trade, Chrystia Freeland, with expanding the CCFTA in her mandate letter.

== History of trade balances ==
Amounts in millions of Canadian dollars.

Trade Type	2010	2011	2012	2013	2014	2015	2016
Total Canadian Exports	587	819	789	800	1,136	790	725
Total Canadian Imports	1,872	1,911	1,677	1,757	1,724	1853	1687
Trade Balance	-1,285	-1,093	-888	-957	-588	-1063	-962

== See also ==
- Canada–Chile relations
- Rules of Origin
- Market access
- Free-trade area
- Tariffs
