= David S. Adams (biologist) =

American academic

Dave S. Adams
- Education: Oklahoma State University; University of Houston; University of Texas
- Employer: Worcester Polytechnic Institute
- Title: Professor, biology and biotechnology
- Website: WPI faculty

David S. Adams is a Professor of Biology at Worcester Polytechnic Institute.

== Education ==
- In 1974, Adams received his BS in physiology from Oklahoma State University.
- In 1976, he obtained his MS in Biophysical Sciences from the University of Houston.
- In 1979, he obtained his PhD Molecular Biology from the University of Texas.
- From 1979 to 1984 Adams received his Postdoc in Molecular Biology from Rockefeller University, New York City.

== Alzheimer's Disease research ==
In 1995, he was the first person to successfully replicate Alzheimer's disease in a mouse. His work in the field suggests that an over-abundance of protein production causes the disease, as opposed to "twists" in neurons, as is alternately argued. The finding remains one of the most significant discoveries in Alzheimer's research to date.

== Worcester Polytechnic Institute ==
Adams lectures multiple biology classes at Worcester Polytechnic Institute, notably Cell Biology, Virology, and Advanced Cell Biology. He is an avid supporter of abolishing textbooks for upper classes, due to his belief that memorization does not contribute to a greater understanding of biology.

== Awards and honors ==
He was elected in 2008 a Fellow of the American Association for the Advancement of Science.

== Research interests ==
- Molecular medicine
- Neurodegenerative diseases
- Neurotrophic factors as therapeutics for neuro-regeneration
- Mouse models for Alzheimer's
