= David B. Adams =

American physician

- Born: 1950 (age 75–76); Annapolis, Maryland
- Education: University of North Carolina, Chapel Hill, Medical College of Virginia
- Known for: Chronic Pancreatitis Surgeries, Chief of Surgery at Guantanamo Bay Naval Base
- Awards: Best Clinical Instructor in General Surgery

David B. Adams (born 1950) is an American physician who is a Professor of Surgery, Chief, Division of Gastrointestinal and Laparoscopic Surgery and Co-Director of the Digestive Disease Center at the Medical University of South Carolina. Adams specializes in chronic pancreatitis surgeries.

== Biography ==
Adams was born in 1950 in Annapolis, Maryland at the U.S. Naval Academy. A Navy junior, he was raised in Newport, Rhode Island, Arlington, Virginia, and Paris, France. Adams was named a Morehead Scholar at the University of North Carolina Chapel Hill in 1969. He graduated Phi Beta Kappa from Chapel Hill in 1973 and then went on to attain his medical degree at the Medical College of Virginia in 1977.

After completing his internship and residency in surgery in 1982 at the U.S. Naval Hospital, Portsmouth, Virginia, he was named Chief of Surgery at the U.S. Naval Hospital, Guantanamo Bay, Cuba (where he was the only surgeon). In 1983, he returned to the continental United States and was named Chief of Surgery at the U.S. Naval Hospital, Charleston, South Carolina. Three years later, he joined the faculty in the department of Surgery at the Medical University of South Carolina.

== Appointments ==
- President of the Waring Library Society
- President of the South Carolina Surgical Society
- President of the South Carolina Chapter of the American College of Surgeons
- Councilor of the Southeastern Surgical Society
- Governor of the American College of Surgeons
- Vice-President of the Halsted Society
- Second Vice-President of the Southern Surgical Association

== Memberships ==
- American College of Surgeons
- American Society for Gastrointestinal Endoscopy
- Society of American Gastrointestinal and Endoscopic Surgeons
- Southeastern Surgical Congress
- Pancreas Club
- Society for Surgery of the Alimentary Tract
- International Society for Digestive Surgery
- Surgical Biology Club III
- Societe Internationale de Chirurgie
- Southern Surgical Association
- American Hepato-Pancreato-Biliary Association
- International Association of Pancreatology
- Halsted Society
- American Surgical Association

== Publications ==
=== Key papers ===
- Morgan, K. A.; Theruvath, T.; Owczarski, S.; Adams, D. B. (2012). "Total pancreatectomy with islet autotransplantation for chronic pancreatitis: Do patients with prior pancreatic surgery have different outcomes?". The American Surgeon. 78 (8): 893–896. doi:10.1177/000313481207800826. PMID 22856498. S2CID 32689157.
- Morgan, K.; Owczarski, S. M.; Borckardt, J.; Madan, A.; Nishimura, M.; Adams, D. B. (2011). "Pain Control and Quality of Life After Pancreatectomy with Islet Autotransplantation for Chronic Pancreatitis". Journal of Gastrointestinal Surgery. 16 (1): 129–133, discussion 133–4. doi:10.1007/s11605-011-1744-y. PMID 22042566. S2CID 7466270.
- Blum, C.; Adams, D. (2011). "Who did the first laparoscopic cholecystectomy?". Journal of Minimal Access Surgery. 7 (3): 165–168. doi:10.4103/0972-9941.83506. PMC 3193755. PMID 22022097.
- Leppard, W. M.; Adams, D. B.; Morgan, K. A. (2011). "Tailgut cysts: What is the best surgical approach?". The American Surgeon. 77 (8): E160–E161. doi:10.1177/000313481107700804. PMID 21944500. S2CID 35737050.
- Adams, D. B. (2011). "Especially dangerous and therefore anxious operations". Archives of Surgery. 146 (6): 732–733. doi:10.1001/archsurg.2011.110. PMID 21830340.
- Morgan, K. A.; Nishimura, M.; Uflacker, R.; Adams, D. B. (2011). "Percutaneous transhepatic islet cell autotransplantation after pancreatectomy for chronic pancreatitis: A novel approach". HPB. 13 (7): 511–516. doi:10.1111/j.1477-2574.2011.00332.x. PMC 3133718. PMID 21689235.
- Leppard, W. M.; Shary, T. M.; Adams, D. B.; Morgan, K. A. (2011). "Choledochoduodenostomy: Is It Really So Bad?". Journal of Gastrointestinal Surgery. 15 (5): 754–757. doi:10.1007/s11605-011-1465-2. PMID 21347871. S2CID 21958856.
- Theruvath, T. P.; Morgan, K. A.; Adams, D. B. (2010). "Mucinous cystic neoplasms of the pancreas: How much preoperative evaluation is needed?". The American Surgeon. 76 (8): 812–817. doi:10.1177/000313481007600823. PMID 20726409. S2CID 10746235.
- Ellis, C. T.; Barbour, J. R.; Shary, T. M.; Adams, D. B. (2010). "Pancreatic cyst: Pseudocyst or neoplasm? Pitfalls in endoscopic retrograde cholangiopancreatography diagnosis". The American Surgeon. 76 (7): 725–730. doi:10.1177/000313481007600728. PMID 20698379. S2CID 25568958.
- Morgan, K. A.; Fontenot, B. B.; Harvey, N. R.; Adams, D. B. (2010). "Revision of anastomotic stenosis after pancreatic head resection for chronic pancreatitis: Is it futile?". HPB. 12 (3): 211–216. doi:10.1111/j.1477-2574.2009.00154.x. PMC 2889274. PMID 20590889.
- Morgan, K. A.; Adams, D. B. (2010). "Solid Tumors of the Body and Tail of the Pancreas". Surgical Clinics of North America. 90 (2): 287–307. doi:10.1016/j.suc.2009.12.009. PMID 20362787.
- Morgan, K.; Mansker, D.; Adams, D. B. (2010). "Not Just for Trauma Patients: Damage Control Laparotomy in Pancreatic Surgery". Journal of Gastrointestinal Surgery. 14 (5): 768–772. doi:10.1007/s11605-010-1186-y. PMID 20224981. S2CID 25077673.
- Dixon, J. A.; Morgan, K. A.; Adams, D. B. (2009). "Management of common bile duct injury during partial gastrectomy". The American Surgeon. 75 (8): 719–721. doi:10.1177/000313480907500815. PMID 19725297. S2CID 22625777.
- Morgan, K. A.; Fontenot, B. B.; Ruddy, J. M.; Mickey, S.; Adams, D. B. (2009). "Endoscopic retrograde cholangiopancreatography gut perforations: When to wait! When to operate!". The American Surgeon. 75 (6): 477–483, discussion 483–4. doi:10.1177/000313480907500605. PMID 19545095. S2CID 44752076.

=== Editor ===
- Adams, David B.; Cotton, Peter B.; Zyromski, Nicholas J.; Windsor, John, eds. (2017). Pancreatitis: Medical and Surgical Management. Wiley-Blackwell. doi:10.1002/9781118924907. ISBN 978-1-118-91712-1.
