= Canada–Uruguay relations =

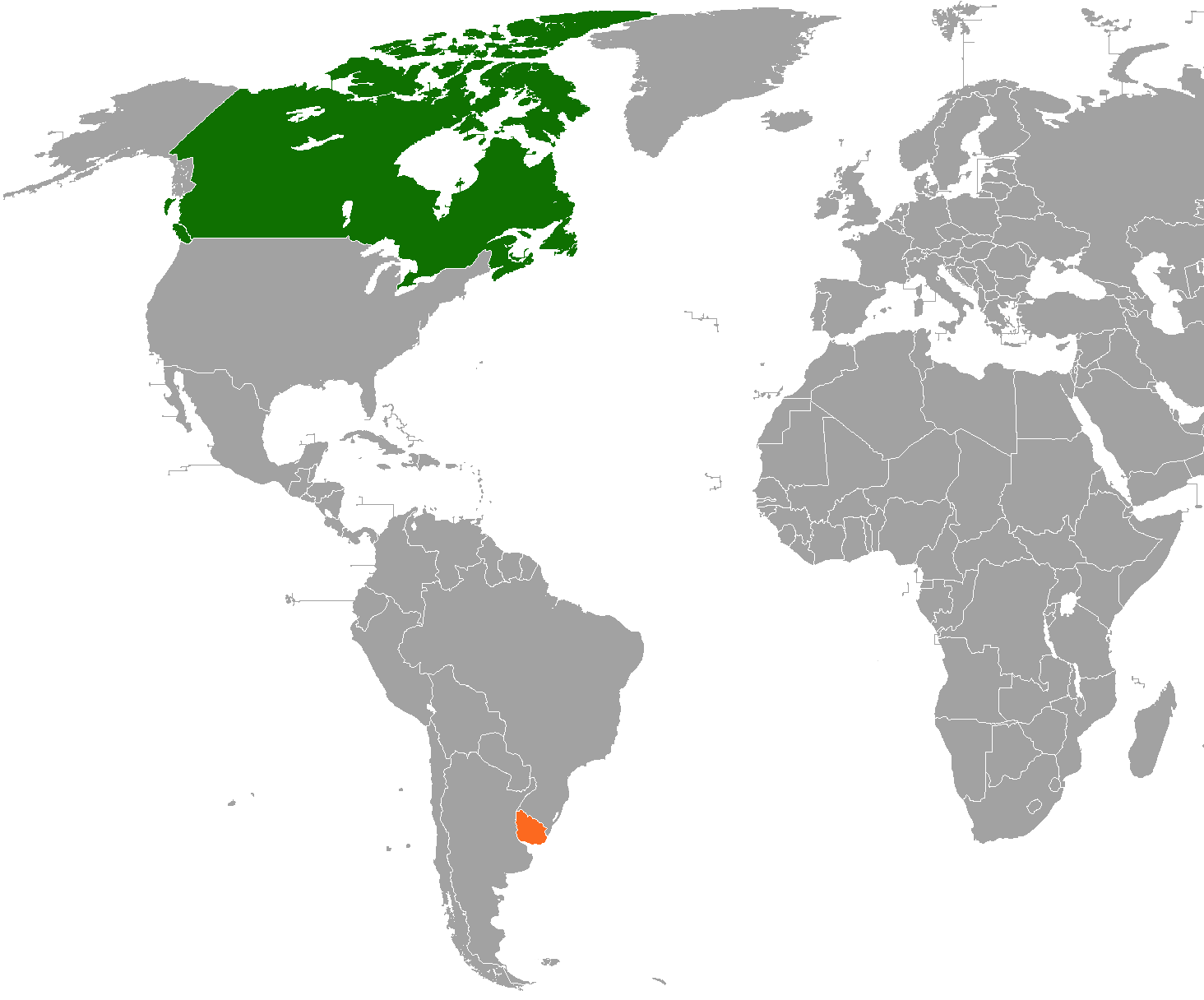

- Canada: Uruguay

Canada and Uruguay established diplomatic relations on March 11th, 1948. Both countries are members of the Cairns Group, the Organization of American States and the United Nations.

== History ==
Canada and Uruguay established diplomatic relations on the March 11th, 1948 in which date the Envoy Extraordinary and Minister Plenipotentiary of Uruguay to Canada, Dr. César Montero Bustamante presented his Letters of Credence to the 17th Governor General of Canada, The Viscount Alexander. In 1953, Canada's first appointed ambassador to Uruguay was based in Buenos Aires, Argentina. In April 2001, Uruguayan President Jorge Batlle paid a visit to Canada to attend the 3rd Summit of the Americas held in Quebec City.

In November 2017, Uruguay co-hosted with Canada the United Nations Peacekeeping Defence Ministerial conference in Vancouver, British Columbia. Uruguay has endorsed the Vancouver Principles on Peacekeeping and the Prevention of the Recruitment and Use of Child Soldiers as well as Canada's Elsie Initiative for Women in Peace Operations. In February 2020, Canadian Leader of the Government in the House of Commons, Pablo Rodríguez, paid a visit to Uruguay to attend the inauguration for President Luis Alberto Lacalle Pou.

== Bilateral agreements ==
Both nations have signed a few agreements such as a Foreign Investment Promotion and Protection Agreement (1999); Social Security Agreement (2002); Audiovisual Co-Production Agreement (2005); Air Transport Agreement (2012) and a Tax Information Exchange Agreement (2014).

== Migration ==
In 2022, there were approximately 5,500 Canadians who claimed to be of Uruguayan descent.

== Trade ==
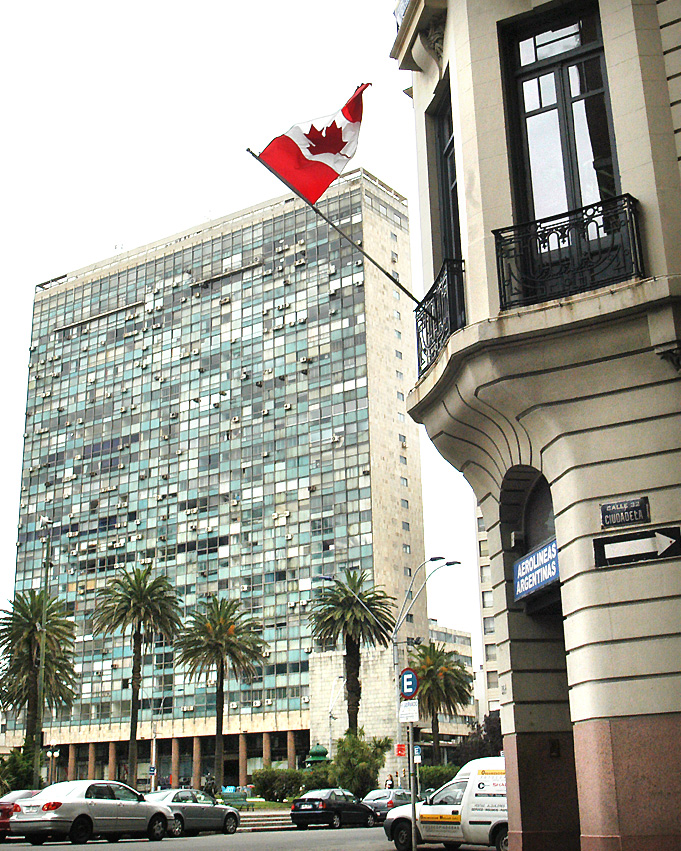
Embassy of Canada in Plaza Independencia, Montevideo.

In 2022, trade between Canada and Uruguay totaled US$256.2 million. Canada's main exports to Uruguay include: fertilizer, machinery, and mechanical appliances. Uruguay's main exports to Canada include: meat, wood, as well as nuts and fruit. In March 2018, Mercosur trade bloc ministers (which includes Uruguay) agreed to launch formal negotiations toward a comprehensive Canada-Mercosur free trade agreement (FTA). Canadian multinational companies such as BlackBerry, Scotiabank and Thomson Reuters operate in Uruguay. In 2024, bilateral trade between Uruguay and Canada totaled US$108.3 million, with Uruguay exporting $67.4 million (led by frozen bovine meat at $41.4 million and sulfate chemical woodpulp at $15 million) and importing $40.9 million (led by potassic fertilizers at $9.61 million and harvesting machinery at $4.09 million), resulting in a $26.5 million trade surplus for Uruguay; in August 2026, monthly trade saw Uruguay export C$8.8 million and import C$1.16 million from Canada.

== Resident diplomatic missions ==
- Canada has an embassy in Montevideo.
- Uruguay has an embassy in Ottawa and consulates-general in Montreal and Toronto.

== See also ==
- Latin American Canadians
