= Pancreatitis: Medical and Surgical Management =

2017 medical book

- Editor: David B. Adams, Peter B. Cotton, Nicholas J. Zyromski, John Windsor
- Publisher: Wiley-Blackwell
- Publication date: 11 February 2017
- ISBN: 9781118917121

Pancreatitis: Medical and Surgical Management is a Wiley-Blackwell medical book on treating pancreatitis. Published in 2017, it was edited by David B. Adams, Peter B. Cotton, Nicholas J. Zyromski, and John A. Windsor.

== General references ==
- Burkhart, Richard A. (March 2018). "Pancreatitis: Medical and Surgical Management". Annals of Surgery. 267 (3): e41. doi:10.1097/SLA.0000000000002441. ISSN 0003-4932.
- Vollmer, Charles M. (November 2017). "Pancreatitis: Medical and Surgical Management, 1st Edition". HPB. 19 (10): II. doi:10.1016/S1365-182X(17)31026-2.
