= Canada–Venezuela relations =

Bilateral relations between Canada and Venezuela

- Canada: Venezuela

Canada–Venezuela relations are the bilateral relations between Canada and Venezuela. Canada and Venezuela established diplomatic relations in the early 1950s. The two countries maintained generally cordial relations for several decades, with economic ties particularly involving the energy, mining, telecommunications and agricultural sectors. Relations deteriorated significantly during the presidencies of Hugo Chávez and Nicolás Maduro, particularly as Canada increasingly criticized the Venezuelan government's erosion of democratic institutions and human rights.

Canada became an active participant in international efforts to address the Venezuelan crisis, including the creation of the Lima Group in 2017. Canada subsequently imposed targeted sanctions on Venezuelan officials, recognized Juan Guaidó as interim president in 2019, and closed its embassy in Caracas later that year after diplomatic visas could not be renewed. Despite souring relations, Canada has continued to provide humanitarian and development assistance to Venezuelans and Venezuelan migrants throughout the region.

Following Venezuela's disputed 2024 presidential election, Canada recognized opposition candidate Edmundo González Urrutia as president-elect in January 2025 and imposed new sanctions on Venezuelan officials. In January 2026, after the removal and arrest of Nicolás Maduro by the United States, Canada stated that it does not recognize Delcy Rodríguez as Venezuela's legitimate leader and called for a Venezuelan-led democratic transition.

== History ==
=== Establishment of diplomatic relations ===
In February 1948, Canada maintained a Consulate General in Caracas, while Venezuela maintained a Consulate General in Montreal. Venezuela sought the establishment of direct diplomatic representation between the two countries, and Canada eventually agreed to exchange diplomatic missions.

Canada elevated its consulate in Caracas to an embassy in 1953, while Venezuela established an embassy in Canada in 1952. The countries subsequently developed commercial relations, particularly in the petroleum, mining, telecommunications and agricultural sectors.

=== Relations under Chávez ===
Relations remained generally cooperative during the early years of Hugo Chávez's presidency, although Canada increasingly expressed concern about democratic governance and human rights in Venezuela.

Canada participated in international electoral observation efforts in Venezuela and supported civil society organizations working on democracy and human rights.

=== Lima Group ===
On 8 August 2017, Canada and representatives of 11 other countries met in Lima, Peru, to establish the Lima Group, an international diplomatic initiative intended to seek a peaceful resolution to the Venezuelan crisis. Canada subsequently became one of the group's most active members.

=== Sanctions ===
Canada introduced targeted sanctions against Venezuelan officials beginning in September 2017 under the Special Economic Measures Act. The initial sanctions targeted 40 individuals associated with the Maduro government. Additional sanctions were imposed in May 2018 and April 2019.

Canada expanded its sanctions regime after the disputed 2024 presidential election. In December 2024, sanctions were imposed on five officials involved in declaring Nicolás Maduro the election winner. Further sanctions were announced in January 2025 and March 2025.

By March 2025, Canada had sanctioned 139 Venezuelan individuals under the new Special Economic Measures (Venezuela) Regulations.

=== Recognition of Juan Guaidó ===
On 23 January 2019, Canada's Minister of Foreign Affairs, Chrystia Freeland, announced that Canada recognized Juan Guaidó, then president of Venezuela's National Assembly, as the interim president of Venezuela.

Canada hosted a Lima Group summit in Ottawa on 4 February 2019 and announced C$53 million in humanitarian assistance for Venezuelans affected by the crisis.

=== Closure of the Canadian embassy ===
In June 2019, Canada announced the closure of its embassy in Caracas after the Venezuelan government refused to renew diplomatic visas for Canadian personnel. Canada has since provided consular services through its embassy in Bogotá, Colombia.

=== 2020–2024 ===
Canada rejected Venezuela's December 2020 parliamentary elections, stating that they failed to meet the minimum conditions for a free and fair democratic process.

Canada continued to support a peaceful, negotiated and Venezuelan-led political solution while expanding humanitarian assistance to people affected by Venezuela's political and economic crisis.

In June 2021, Canada co-hosted the International Donors' Conference in Solidarity with Venezuelan Refugees and Migrants alongside the European Union, mobilizing international humanitarian support.

By 2023, Canada reported contributing more than C$180 million in humanitarian, development and stabilization assistance since 2019. In March 2023, Canada announced an additional C$58.55 million in assistance during an international conference in Brussels.

=== 2024 presidential election ===
The 2024 Venezuelan presidential election became a major point of tension between Canada and Venezuela. The Venezuelan National Electoral Council declared Nicolás Maduro the winner, but Canada stated that the election lacked transparency and credibility.

Canada stated that publicly available voting records indicated that opposition candidate Edmundo González Urrutia had won the election and condemned post-election repression against opposition politicians, journalists and civil society members.

=== Recognition of Edmundo González Urrutia ===
On 9 January 2025, Canada formally recognized Edmundo González Urrutia as the president-elect of Venezuela, stating that publicly available electoral records demonstrated that he had won the July 2024 election.

Canada rejected Nicolás Maduro's inauguration for another presidential term on 10 January 2025, while G7 foreign ministers issued a statement condemning the absence of democratic legitimacy in the inauguration.

=== 2026 political crisis ===
In January 2026, Venezuela experienced a major political crisis following the removal and arrest of Nicolás Maduro during a United States military operation. The U.S. operation produced a mixed reaction in Canada. Some Venezuelan Canadians celebrated Maduro's removal, while others protested the American military intervention on the grounds that it violated Venezuelan sovereignty and international law. On 4 January, Venezuelan Canadians opposed to Maduro's government gathered at Nathan Phillips Square in Toronto to celebrate Maduro's capture, singing the Venezuelan national anthem and waving Venezuelan flags. Some participants said they viewed the operation as an opportunity for Venezuela to achieve freedom and democratic government. At the same time, demonstrators gathered outside the Consulate General of the United States in Toronto to protest the operation, with some describing it as a violation of international law. In Montreal, approximately 50 people participated in an anti-imperialist demonstration outside the Consulate General of the United States in Montreal, chanting slogans against U.S. intervention. Public opinion was similarly divided. An Abacus Data survey conducted from 9 to 14 January found that 30% of Canadians considered Maduro's removal a good thing, compared with 40% who considered it a bad thing, while 29% were undecided. The reaction varied significantly by political affiliation, with Conservative voters considerably more likely to view the removal positively than Liberal and New Democratic Party voters. Among Canadians who followed the events more closely, 34% viewed Maduro's removal positively and 48% negatively.

Prime Minister Mark Carney took a position that welcomed the prospect of Maduro's removal while stopping short of endorsing the American military action itself. On 3 January, Carney said that Canada "welcomes the opportunity for freedom, democracy, peace, and prosperity for the Venezuelan people", while emphasizing that Canada had not recognized Maduro's government since the disputed 2018 Venezuelan presidential election. He nevertheless called for a "peaceful, negotiated, and Venezuelan-led transition process" and urged all parties to respect international law and the Venezuelan people's sovereign right to determine their own future. Carney's response contrasted with that of Conservative Party leader Pierre Poilievre, who congratulated Donald Trump for the operation and praised Maduro's capture. The Green Party of Canada, by contrast, condemned the operation as a violation of international law and characterized the capture as a "kidnapping".

Canada's Minister of Foreign Affairs, Anita Anand, stated that Canada continued to reject the legitimacy of the Maduro regime while calling for restraint and respect for international law.

Government briefing documents released in February 2026 stated that Canada did not recognize Delcy Rodríguez as Venezuela's legitimate leader and supported a Venezuelan-led democratic transition. The documents also stated that Canada was exploring options for re-establishing a diplomatic presence in Caracas.

By June 2026, Canadian officials reported that hundreds of political prisoners had been released while emphasizing that Venezuela's security institutions remained largely intact and democratic elections had not yet been scheduled.

== Cooperation ==
=== Aviation ===
On 26 June 1990, the governments of Canada and Venezuela signed a formal Air Transport Agreement. This bilateral accord legally granted designated carriers from both nations the rights to operate international air services between their territories, allowing for the transport of passengers, cargo, and mail connecting Toronto and Montreal with Caracas. Since the agreement was signed, air travel between the two nations primarily relied on code-sharing and regional connections via third-country hubs such as Colombia, Mexico, Panama, and the United States.

On 26 March 2004, Air Canada announced its first direct scheduled service into Venezuela as part of a broader South American expansion. Launched in July 2004 using an Airbus A319, the flight initially operated three times per week with a technical stopover in Port of Spain, Trinidad and Tobago. Driven by growing passenger demand and business travel, Air Canada decoupled the route in April 2008, removing the Trinidad stopover to establish Toronto–Caracas as a dedicated, non-stop flight.

On 17 March 2014, Air Canada indefinitely suspended all flights to Caracas until further notice. The airline cited operational safety risks stemming from escalating anti-government protests in Venezuela, alongside severe currency controls imposed by the Venezuelan government that prevented foreign airlines from repatriating ticket revenues. At the time of the exit, Air Canada had approximately US$20.8 million in corporate funds blocked within the country. The suspension triggered immediate diplomatic retaliation by the Bolivarian government. On 18 March, the Venezuelan government officially severed commercial ties with Air Canada and revoked its operational permits, effectively ending direct commercial aviation ties between the two countries.

Brief diplomatic maneuvering occurred later that year when Venezuelan Tourism Minister Andrés Izarra claimed Air Canada had submitted written requests to return. On 4 August 2014, Air Canada clarified its stance, stating that while it denied reports of an imminent return, it remained willing to evaluate a resumption of the three weekly flights if Venezuela safely resolved the ongoing civil unrest and addressed the repatriation of corporate revenues locked inside the country. However, because the financial conditions failed to improve, no operations were ever restored.

==== Arbitration case ====
Following years of failed diplomatic and administrative attempts to recover its blocked assets, Air Canada formally escalated the dispute into a legal battle. On 13 January 2017, the airline filed an international lawsuit against Venezuela at the World Bank's International Centre for Settlement of Investment Disputes (ICSID) under case number ARB(AF)/17/1. Air Canada argued that Venezuela had breached the 1996 Canada-Venezuela Bilateral Investment Treaty (BIT) by failing to process currency exchanges to repatriate its Bolivar-denominated ticket returns into USD. Venezuela contested the tribunal's jurisdiction, arguing the issue should be handled through standard aviation agreements, but the tribunal rejected this defense.

On 13 September 2021, the ICSID tribunal ruled in favor of Air Canada, finding that Venezuela violated international protocols regarding the free transfer of funds. Though Venezuela attempted to overturn the decision in a Paris appellate court, the award was upheld in October 2023.

Most recently, on 14 August 2026, a U.S. Federal District Court judge in Washington, D.C., decisively rejected Venezuela's final motions to dismiss enforcement. The judge granted Air Canada the right to legally enforce the US$25.5 million arbitral award (inclusive of accumulated interest and legal fees), bringing a major development to the decade-long fallout of the route's closure.

=== Trade ===
Canada and Venezuela have historically maintained commercial relations in energy, mining, agriculture, machinery and telecommunications. However, Venezuela's political and economic crisis has significantly reduced bilateral trade and investment in comparison with the 2000s.

Canadian companies continue to maintain interests in Venezuela's natural resource sector, although investment has been affected by sanctions and political instability.

In June 2026, Canada recorded a C$38.5 million trade surplus with Venezuela, exporting C$45.7 million and importing C$7.26 million. Year-over-year from June 2025, Canadian exports to Venezuela grew by 178% (up from C$16.5 million), while imports from Venezuela rose by 180% (up from C$2.59 million).

=== Humanitarian and development assistance ===
Canada has become one of the principal international contributors to humanitarian assistance for Venezuelans affected by the country's crisis.

Canadian funding supports humanitarian organizations working in health, nutrition, education, food security, protection and livelihoods inside Venezuela and throughout Latin America and the Caribbean.

Following destructive earthquakes in Venezuela in June 2026, Canada announced C$5 million in humanitarian assistance and later increased its matching contribution, bringing total Canadian assistance for the earthquake response to C$12 million. As part of this response, the Canadian Red Cross, deployed technical experts and provided emergency supplies, including medical kits, shelter materials, hygiene items, and search-and-rescue funding in collaboration with international Red Cross partners.

=== Indigenous peoples ===
Canada has historically supported initiatives involving Venezuelan Indigenous communities through development and local community programs, including projects funded through the Canada Fund for Local Initiatives.

== Migration ==
Migration has become an increasingly important component of Canada–Venezuela relations. Millions of Venezuelans have left the country since the onset of the political and economic crisis, creating one of the world's largest displacement crises.

Canada has supported refugee and migrant integration programs in countries including Colombia, Peru and Ecuador through funding for education, healthcare, employment, protection and regularization initiatives.

== Diplomatic missions ==
Canada closed its embassy in Caracas in 2019, and consular services for Canadians in Venezuela are currently provided through Canada's embassy in Bogotá, Colombia.

As of 2026, Canada has stated that it is exploring the possibility of re-establishing a diplomatic presence in Caracas, although no resident embassy has reopened.

Venezuela maintains an embassy in Ottawa and consular representation in Canada.
