= Pancreatitis (book) =

1966 medical book by T.T. White

- Author: T. T. White
- Publisher: Edward Arnold
- Publication date: 1966

Pancreatitis is a medical book by T.T. White, published in 1966 by Edward Arnold. The book is based on White's had studies of pancreatitis in the United States and France, including alongside French physician and researcher Pierre Mallet-Guy. The book discusses the possible causes and treatments for the disease, especially surgical interventions such as pancreaticojejunostomy.

Proceedings of the Royal Society of Medicine praised the book for its treatment of surgical techniques, the organization, and the illustrations. A reviewer in the Archives of Internal Medicine praised the sections on the aetiology of pancreatitis, the selection of literature, but felt that some of the techniques he discussed and advocated for, as well as some of the generalizations about the prevalence of pancreatisis, were influenced by his time in France and may not be suited to American physicians. Further, he criticized White's lack of attention towards isotope scanning as a diagnostic tool.
