= David Adams (football manager) =

Welsh football coach and academic (born 1979)

Dr. David Adams
Personal information
- Full name: David Adams
- Date of birth: 15 May 1979 (age 47)
- Place of birth: Haverfordwest, Wales

Team information
- Current team: Wales (chief football officer)

Managerial career
- Years: Team
- 2014–2015: Swansea City U23
- 2014–2017: Swansea City (head of coaching)
- 2015–2016: Swansea City (caretaker; assistant)
- 2017: Everton (head of coaching)
- 2017–2018: Middlesbrough (assistant)
- 2019–2021: Wales (technical director)
- 2021–: Wales (chief football officer)

Dr. David Adams (born 15 May 1979) is a Welsh football coach, academic, and leader who currently serves as the Chief Football Officer for the Football Association of Wales (FAW). He holds a PhD in Coach Effectiveness and is a UEFA Pro Licence holder. Adams is known for his work in player pathways and technical development, having previously held senior coaching roles at Swansea City, Everton, and Middlesbrough.

== Education and Academic Career ==
Adams was born in Haverfordwest, Wales. He graduated from the University of Wales Institute (now Cardiff Met) with a BSc in Sports Coaching (1998) and an MSc in Coaching Science (2001). In 2018, he completed his PhD in Coach Effectiveness at the University of South Wales (USW), where his research focused on elite youth coach education.

Between 2006 and 2013, Adams served as a Senior and Principal Lecturer at the University of South Wales. During this time, he designed the UK's first MSc blended learning football course for industry professionals and developed a football coaching degree in partnership with the FAW. He also managed the Welsh Universities team, winning the BUCS title in the 2012/13 season.

== Coaching Career ==
=== Swansea City ===
In May 2014, Adams joined Swansea City as Head of Coaching. He was tasked with overseeing the academy's transition from Category 3 to Category 1 status, a goal achieved within two years. Simultaneously, he managed the club's U21 and U23 sides, guiding them to back-to-back league titles in the 2014–15 and 2015–16 seasons.

During his tenure, he oversaw the graduation of several players to the first team and international setups, including Daniel James, Joe Rodon, Connor Roberts, and Oli McBurnie.

Following the departure of manager Garry Monk in December 2015, Adams was appointed Interim Head Coach alongside Alan Curtis. The pair managed the team for 12 Premier League matches. Adams finished the season as Assistant Coach guiding Swansea to a 12th-place finish in the Premier League, their second highest finish in league history.

=== Everton ===
In March 2017, Adams was headhunted by Everton to serve as the Academy Head of Coaching, working under Academy Director Peter Vint.

=== Middlesbrough ===
In June 2017, Adams reunited with former Swansea manager Garry Monk at Middlesbrough, appointed as First Team Coach/Assistant Manager. He was responsible for on-pitch training and tactical planning. He left the role in December 2017 following Monk's departure.

== Football Association of Wales ==
=== Technical Director (2019–2021) ===
In 2019, Adams was appointed Technical Director of the FAW, succeeding Osian Roberts. He was responsible for the strategic direction of coach education (serving as Director for the UEFA Pro Licence) and the "Welsh Way" national syllabus. During this period, the senior men's team reached the Round of 16 at UEFA Euro 2020.

=== Chief Football Officer (2021–Present) ===
In October 2021, Adams was promoted to Chief Football Officer. His remit expanded to include oversight of both the Men's and Women's National Team Head Coaches, as well as the high-performance strategy including sports science, medicine, and analysis.

Under his technical leadership, the association achieved:

- Qualification for the 2022 FIFA World Cup (Wales' first appearance in 64 years).
- Qualification for two youth final tournaments, a first in FAW history.

== UEFA technical observer and coach education ==
Since 2020, Adams has served as a UEFA technical observer. In this role, he is responsible for analysing tactical trends across major European competitions, including the UEFA Champions League, UEFA Europa League, and various UEFA finals tournaments.

During his tenure, he was credited with mentoring and working with a generation of high-profile coaches who undertook their qualifications with the FAW, including Mikel Arteta, Pep Lijnders, Rob Edwards, Davide Ancelotti, and Eric Ramsay.

== Honors and Achievements ==
Swansea City U23

- Professional Development League Titles (2014–15, 2015–16)

University of South Wales

- BUCS Premier League promotions (3 in 3 seasons); BUSA Winners (2012/13)
