= Dave Adams (naval officer) =

American naval officer

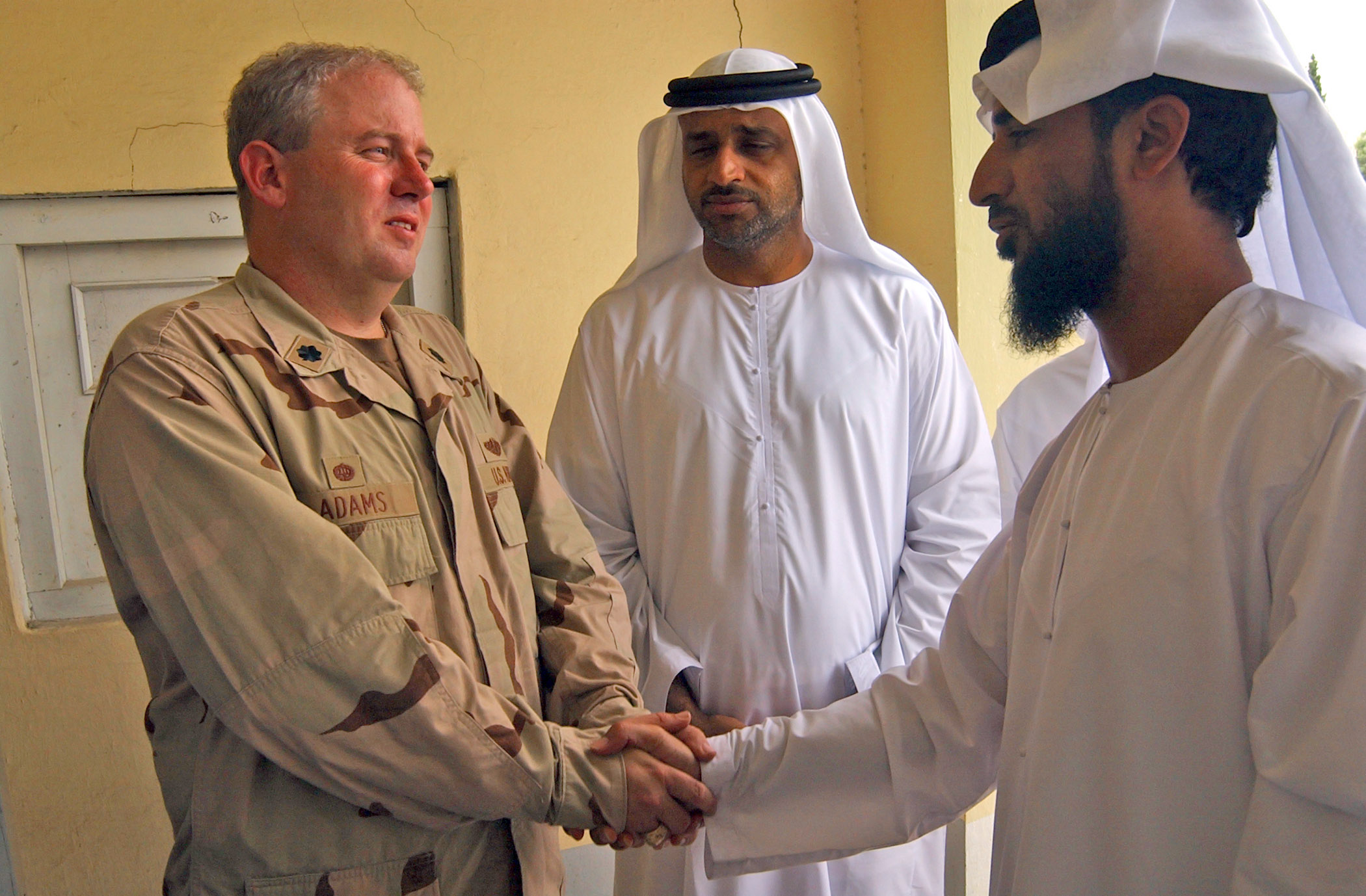
- Commander Dave Adams greets United Arab Emirates diplomats.
- Military career
- Branch: United States Navy
- Rank: Captain

Dave Adams is an officer in the United States Navy. Adams commanded the USS Santa Fe (SSN-763), a nuclear submarine, in 2009. Previously he was in charge of the Khost Provincial Reconstruction Team in Afghanistan.

The Wall Street Journal published an op-ed coauthored by Adams, where he advanced the position that Afghanistan did not need more American troops.

Adams enlisted in the Navy in 1985. Adams earned a degree in Mechanical Engineering from the University of Texas at Austin in 1990, while he was an enlisted rating. After completing his degree, Adams was commissioned and began serving in nuclear submarines. He was promoted to the rank of captain (O-6) in 2012.

He was relieved of his command in January 2016 as the result of an accident in which his sub, the USS Georgia, struck a buoy and ran aground.

== Service in Afghanistan ==
While Adams served in Afghanistan he oversaw the construction of multiple public works, including dams and bridges.
