= Dave Adams (Canadian football) =

Canadian football player

Profile
- Positions: Guard, Tackle

Personal information
- Born: January 14, 1920; Castor, Alberta, Canada
- Died: November 21, 2011 (aged 91); Nanaimo, British Columbia, Canada
- Listed height: 5 ft 8 in (1.73 m)
- Listed weight: 160 lb (73 kg)

Career history
- 1946–1948: Calgary Stampeders

Awards and highlights
- Grey Cup champion (1948); 2× CFL West All-Star (1946, 1947)

David Roger "Steaky" Adams (January 14, 1920 – November 21, 2011) was a Canadian professional football player who played for the Calgary Stampeders. He won the Grey Cup with them in 1948. Adams was also selected for the all-star team in 1946 and 1947. Previously, Adams served in World War II with the Royal Canadian Engineers. He died in 2011.
