= Embassy of Cuba, Ottawa =

Diplomatic mission of Cuba to Canada

Embassy of Cuba in Ottawa
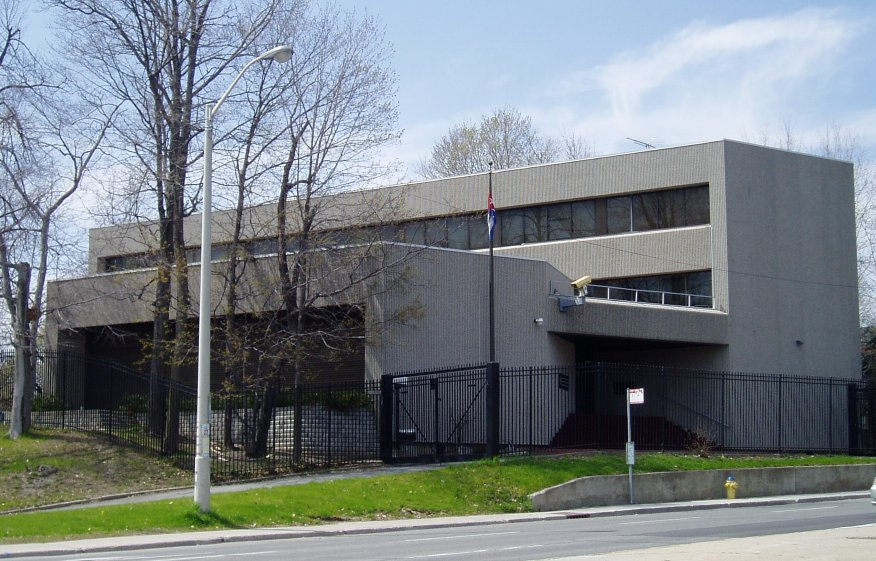
- Location: Old Ottawa East
- Address: 388 Main Street
- Coordinates: 45.40325°N 75.675223°W

The Embassy of Cuba in Ottawa is the Cuban embassy in Ottawa, Ontario, Canada. It is located at 388 Main Street in Old Ottawa East.

== History ==
Diplomatic relations between Canada and Cuba began in 1945, and were uninterrupted by the Cuban Revolution.

The Cuban embassy was initially located at 690 Island Park Drive and subsequently relocated to Chapel Street in Sandy Hill. For many years the Chapel Street location was the target of repeated terrorist attacks by U.S.-based anti-Castro groups. The first attack was an improvised bomb made out of bazooka shells that went off on September 22, 1966. It caused only minor damage to the embassy, blowing out the embassy's windows, and those of many nearby homes and made a crater in the sidewalk. In 1968 the embassy moved into a stone manor at 700 Echo Drive in Old Ottawa South, which was the site of another unsuccessful attack in 1974. It moved to its present heavily fortified location in 1977.

This bombing campaign would continue until 1980 with the embassy and the Cuban consulate in Montreal being repeatedly attacked. Most of these attacks were small and badly planned and only one person was killed: Sergio Pérez Castillo, who died when the consulate in Montreal was bombed in 1972.

Cuba also maintains Consulate General offices in Toronto and Montreal.

== See also ==
- Cuban diplomatic missions
