= David Adam (diplomat) =

Canadian diplomat

David Graeme Adam (born 1941) is a Canadian diplomat. He was the Ambassador Extraordinary and Plenipotentiary to Ecuador and Panama.

Born in Toronto, Ontario, Adam graduated from the University of Toronto Faculty of Law in 1968.

In 1973, when Adam was a first secretary in Chile, he gained some notoriety when he and his colleague Marc Dolgin offered refuge in their homes to about fourteen Chileans fleeing the 11 September coup d'état. Canada's response to the coup was initially ambivalent, and some credit the actions of Adam and Dolgin for the Canadian government's decision to permit Chilean refugees to settle in Canada. Adam reports that he is quoted (anonymously) in the 1982 film Missing, a dramatization of the story of American journalist Charles Horman, who disappeared in the aftermath of the coup.

Diplomatic posts
Preceded by Archibald Duncan McArthur	Ambassador Extraordinary and Plenipotentiary to Ecuador; 1995-1998	Succeeded by John Kneale
Preceded by Daniel Daley	Ambassador Extraordinary and Plenipotentiary to Panama; 2002-2005	Succeeded by José Herran-Lima
