= Convictorio Carolino =

School in Santiago, Chile

- Former name: Royal Noble Seminary of Saint Charles
- Active: 1778–1813
- Founders: Melchor de Santiago Concha; Gabriel de Egaña; José Perfecto de Salas; Agustín de Jáuregui
- Religious affiliation: Roman Catholic
- Location: Santiago, Chile
- Merged into the Instituto Nacional

The Convictorio Carolino was a school which operated in Santiago in colonial Chile. Some of the most important figures in the Chilean War of Independence were educated there.

The Convictorio was very strict, and boarders were subject to rigid rules of conduct. Subjects taught there included Latin, theology, philosophy, social conduct, and Spanish language fundamentals.

The existence of the College was fundamental to the development of education at the time, as it was one of the few Chilean educational institutions in operation. In 1813 it was integrated into the nascent Instituto Nacional, which retained the same rector, and continues to uphold its academic standards to this day.

== History ==
In the mid-18th century there were only two boarding schools in the Captaincy General of Chile – the Convictorio of San Francisco Javier and another in Concepción – both of the Jesuits. Two other schools – Colegio del Santo Ángel de la Guarda (a theological seminary maintained by the Dominicans) and the Royal University of San Felipe – are not generally considered to be in the same category since the seminary was confined to those pursuing a career in the priesthood, and the University was focused on bachelor's degree programs.

The Convictorio of San Francisco Javier, a direct predecessor of the Convictorio Carolino, had a small number of students and a dilapidated building at the time. In 1767, King Charles III decreed the expulsion of the Jesuits from the dominions of the Spanish Empire. When this took effect in the Captaincy General of Chile, it interrupted classes. This greatly worried members of the government, because in order to receive some level of education, young people had to travel to the National University of San Marcos in Lima or to Córdoba del Tucumán in the Viceroyalty of the Río de la Plata.

On 9 July 1769, the King decreed the creation of boards to manage assets seized from the expelled Jesuits. In Chile this body was composed of Francisco Javier de Morales y Castejón de Arroyo, the Captain General, who presided; Juan de Balmaceda y Zenzano, judge of the Real Audiencia; Melchor de Santiago Concha, prosecutor of the same; Dr. José Antonio Martínez de Aldunate, Canon of the Cathedral of the Royal University; and Alonso de Guzmán, lawyer of the Real Audiencia, Natural Protector General (a post created to handle suits brought by Native Chileans), and professor of law at the University. On 14 July 1772 the board approved the foundation of a school named Royal Noble Seminary of Saint Charles Spanish: Real Seminario de Nobles de San Carlos, in honor of Charles III. It was to be located on the site of the closed Convictorio of San Francisco Javier.

On 7 August of the same year, statutes were approved which established that its name was to be Convictorio Carolino, based on the patronage of Saint Charles. The door would bear the royal coat of arms and its students could make use of the hallmark of the crown.

Despite good intentions, for various reasons the Convictorio could not be put into operation immediately. Initially it was intended to establish it at the College of San Pablo, former residence of the Jesuits, but this was not possible due to the dilapidated state of the building. José Perfecto de Salas, a neat and hardworking man, thought of using the site of the Colegio Máximo de San Miguel, located behind the Cathedral, present site of the National Congress. In 1777 this locale was occupied by the Convictorio. In parallel, the process of filling positions began, and the priest Gabriel de Egaña was chosen as rector that November. On 14 January 1778, the awarding of professorships was concluded, with Mariano Zambrano in theology, Agustín Seco y Santa-Cruz in law, Mariano Pérez de Saravia in philosophy, José Antonio de Villegas in grammar and Latin, and José Cornelio Rojas as chancellor.

On 30 March 1778, the decree ordering its opening was issued, and this was carried out on 10 April of the same year, in a solemn ceremony attended by the main authorities of Chile, led by Captain General and Governor Agustín de Jáuregui.

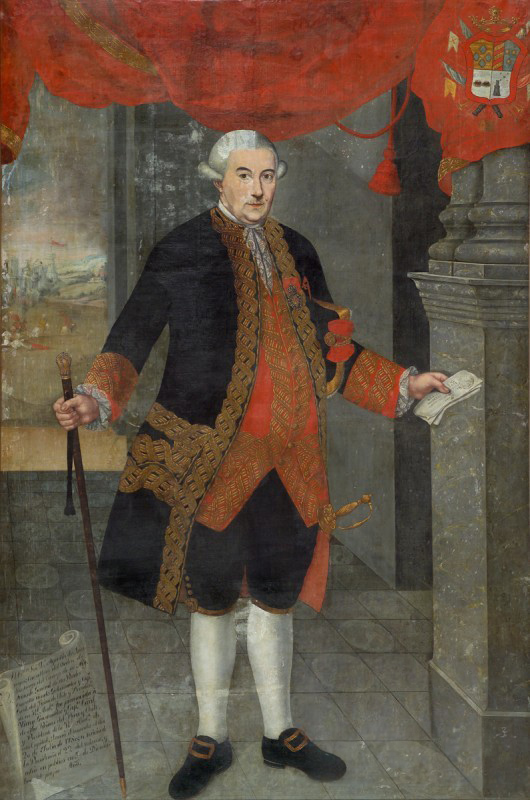
Governor Agustín de Jáuregui, under whom the Convictorio was founded and opened

The college started operating with financial problems, which were worsened by new royal minister, José Gálvez, who reduced the budget for the Convictorio and even looked to merge it with the Theological Seminary. This elicited protests from the administrators of both institutions to the King, arguing that the schools were very different, with one focused on religious education and the other on language and general training for all professions. The rector Miguel Palacios, faced with closing the Convictorio if funding continued to decrease, protested to Captain General Ambrosio de Benavides in 1786. Forced to choose between accepting the cuts of Minister Gálvez or displeasing His Majesty, Benavides decided to convene an executive panel. This panel decided to maintain the revenues of the Convictorio. Thus, it continued to operate.

In 1804 the college again suffered economic difficulties and had to lower the wages of student teachers.

On 20 February 1811, Manuel de Salas, Director of the Academy of San Luis, proposed to the government a unification of all educational institutions of the time on one campus, comprising the Theological Seminary, the Natural College of Chillán, the Academy of San Luis, the Royal University of San Felipe, and the Convictorio Carolino. The rector of the latter, Pedro Tomás de la Torre endorsed this effort. The idea gained currency in society, being discussed by the Congress and finally materializing in 1813 with the founding of the National Institute. The last rector of the Convictorio, the priest José Francisco de Echaurren, became rector of the new Institute.

== Educational scheme ==
The Convictorio Carolino was a Catholic school under the patronage of King Carlos III. Its patron saint was Saint Charles. Its students enjoyed the privilege of using the royal hallmark. The King also provided scholarships for four students. Tuition for other students was $80 per year. The school only admitted "children of legitimate marriage, of known virtue, and of no known infamy."

The college incorporated into its statues severe punishments such as flogging and stocks. Students were expected to display exemplary behavior both inside and outside the Convictorio, not to participate in games or fights, and be correct and polite in speech.

Classes consisted of 45-minute lectures (lessons and repetitions), and on each Wednesday and Saturday, evaluations were performed by different professors. Thursday was given as a free day, with classes finishing at 9:00 am.

== Notable alumni ==
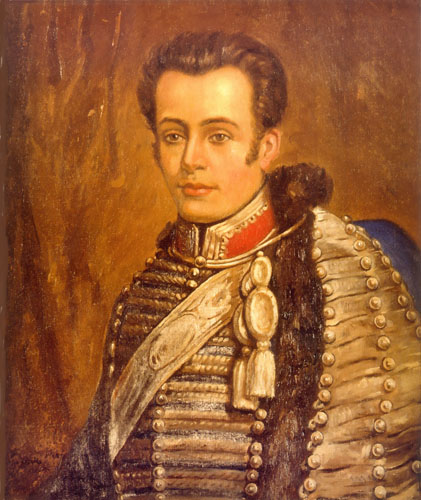
Portrait of José Miguel Carrera, alumnus of the Convictorio

- José Miguel Carrera, soldier and politician, first commander in chief of the Chilean Army, Chairman of the Interim Governing Board, Supreme Dictator of Chile, and considered father of the country
- Francisco Antonio Pinto, lawyer, general, and President of Chile
- Manuel Rodríguez Erdoíza, lawyer, politician, guerrilla, and key figure in the Chilean War of Independence
- Diego Portales, politician, businessman, and Minister of State
- Manuel Pérez de Cotapos, deputy for Talca and president of the National Congress of Chile in 1812

== Rectors ==
- Gabriel de Egaña (1777–1784)
- Juan Nicolás Varas (1784–1786
- Miguel Palacios (1786–1798)
- Pedro Tomás de la Torre (1798–1812)
- Pbto. José Francisco Echaurren (1812–1813)

== See also ==
- Colonial Chile
- Instituto Nacional General José Miguel Carrera
- Royal University of San Felipe
