= Curiñancu =

Curiñancu or Curignancu, Mapuche Toqui from 1766–1774 who led the Mapuche uprising of 1766.

Captain General, Antonio de Guill y Gonzaga, undertook a fantastic scheme to gather the Araucanians into cities, despite their well-known loathing of city life. The outcome of this scheme was a renewal of the war with the Mapuche. They elected Curiñancu toqui and prepared for hostilities in case the Spaniards should persist in this course. Two or three cities were begun, but the Mapuche demanded tools with which to work, offered all manner of excuses for the purpose of delaying the enterprise, and finally, these efforts failing to dissuade the Spaniards from the undertaking, they slew their superintendents and besieged the quartermaster in his camp. Governor Guill y Gonzaga retaliated by forming an alliance with the Pehuenches. Curiñancu, ended this treasonous alliance with a sudden assault on the Pehuenches, routing them in battle. He captured their leader, Coliguna, Curiñancu executed him.

Gonzaga soon died, following the failure to accomplish his scheme, and Juan de Balmaseda y Censano Beltrán governed for a short time until Francisco Javier de Morales y Castejón de Arrollo succeeded to the governorship. The war with the Araucanians continued. Curiñancu and his vice toqui, Leviantu, constantly raided in Spanish territory, defeating the Spaniards occasionally.

By 1773, the war with the Mapuche had cost Spain over a million and a half dollars. Agustín de Jáuregui y Aldecoa finally agreed to a treaty in the Parliament of Tapihue (1774) which reaffirmed the old treaties of Quillin and Negrete, and Curiñancu exacted a further concession, that the Araucanians would be permitted to keep an embassy in Santiago, like any other independent nation.
