= José Santiago Rodríguez Zorrilla =

21st bishop of Santiago, Chile

- Bishop of Santiago
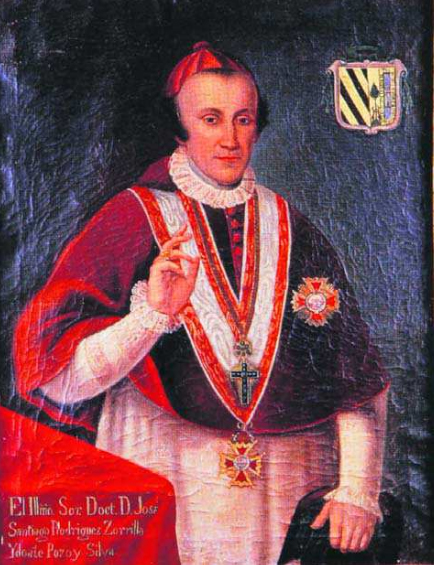
- Portrait of Monseñor Rodríguez Zorrilla (19th century), now preserved in the Museum of Carmen de Maipú

Orders
- Ordination: 1775
- Consecration: 1815 by Pius VII

Personal details
- Born: 30 December 1752 Santiago, Chile
- Died: 5 April 1832 (aged 79) Madrid, Spain
- Education: Royal University of San Felipe
- Coat of arms

José Santiago Rodríguez Zorrilla (30 December 1752 – 5 April 1832) was the 21st bishop of Santiago, Chile, (Note: Counting Diego de Zambrana de Villalobos, who does not appear on the official list of bishops in the Metropolitan Cathedral of Santiago) known for his fervent support of the Spanish government during the Chilean War of Independence.

== Biography ==
=== Early years and education ===
The son of Manuel Rodríguez Zorrilla and María del Carmen Idoate y Pozo, he studied at the Royal Seminary of San Francisco Javier, and later at the Royal University of San Felipe, where he obtained his bachelor's degree (1771) and doctorate in theology (1775). While in Lima, he studied law at the National University of San Marcos.

Ordained a priest in 1775, he divided his time between ecclesiastical activities and teaching. He served as rector of the Royal University of San Felipe for three terms: 1788, 1789, and 1803. He was also canon of the Metropolitan Cathedral of Santiago (1787), pastor of Renca (1792–1796), and secretary of bishops Alday, Sobrino, and Marán.

After the death of the latter he was appointed Vicar Capitular, a position he reoccupied after the death of bishop-elect Martínez de Aldunate in 1811.

=== Friction with the patriots ===
In 1811 the Regency Council petitioned Pope Pius VII to fill the vacancy in the Santiago diocese. Pius VII agreed in 1815, and Rodriguez Zorrilla assumed the position of bishop the following year.

Taking a hardline stance, Rodriguez Zorrilla faced several problems with the revolutionary authorities of Chile. In 1812, he refused to swear allegiance to the Provisional Constitution of 1812, and in response he was declared guilty of treason against the state and relegated to Colina.

Though assuming the ecclesiastical authority of the diocese of Santiago in 1816, he had only four years of actual governance of it (out of the 17 of his official term), since when not confined somewhere within Chile, he was exiled from the country.

After the Battle of Rancagua he presided over the trials of several priests for disloyalty, attributing to them active participation in the closing of the National Institute.

He continued openly expressing a defiant position against the government of Bernardo O'Higgins, which deported him to Mendoza, Argentina in 1817.

=== Return, confinement, and new exile ===
In 1822, Rodríguez was able to return to the country, provided that he delegate his administrative functions to a priest who had the full confidence of the government. In the meantime he lived in Melipilla.

That same year he was reinstated in his post, which he held until 1825 when he was again expelled from the country. This time, the reason was directly related to the controversial visit of the Apostolic legate of the Vatican, Giovanni Muzi, whom the press accused of visiting the country as a spy of the Holy Alliance. This suspicion was brought about by the recent opposition of the papacy to the independence of the countries of Latin America, as had been highlighted in the encyclical Etsi longissimo terrarum, which called for "uprooting and completely destroying the baleful weeds of riot and insurrection that the enemy sowed in those countries" of "America, subject of the Catholic King of Spain". Amid the ensuing controversy between Rodríguez Zorrilla, the independent canon José Ignacio Cienfuegos, and the government, the bishop was shipped to Acapulco, which he left (via Veracruz, New York, and Le Havre) for Madrid.

...Téngase presente que las ideas de nuestros antepasados, fundadores de la República (de Chile), eran de tal naturaleza con lo que respecta a la curia romana, que tan solo haber escrito Mariano Egaña -que no hubo mejor católico- que el obispo Rodríguez estaba carteándose con Roma, le pusieron aquellos a medianoche en un colchón y le mandaron a México ...Note that the ideas of our ancestors, founders of the Republic (of Chile), were such with regard to the Roman curia that once Mariano Egaña – there was no better Catholic – had written that the bishop Rodriguez was corresponding with Rome, they put him on a mattress at midnight and sent him to Mexico.

— Benjamín Vicuña Mackenna

José Santiago Rodríguez Zorrilla died in Madrid in 1832. His remains were repatriated and buried in the Metropolitan Cathedral of Santiago in December 1852.

== Notes ==
Preceded by Francisco José Marán	= Bishop of Santiago; 1815 – 5 April 1832	Succeeded by Manuel Vicuña Larraín
