= Juan de Balmaseda y Censano Beltrán =

Juan de Balmaseda y Censano Beltrán (16 April 1702, Galilea, La Rioja – 30 May 1778), interim Royal Governor of Chile.

Son of Pedro de Balmaceda and Angela Zenzano; lawyer of the Consejos de Espana, named an oidor of Chile in 1739, which became permanent 28 November 1742. As time went on he was given additional offices. José Antonio Manso de Velasco appointed him judge of inheritances. Francisco José de Ovando, Marquis of Ovando appointed him protective judge of the Partido de Aconcagua on 17 July 1745. Lastly the Viceroy of Peru Manuel de Amat y Juniet made him minister of the Royal Junta de Tabacos on 3 July 1766.

As dean of the Royal Audiencia of Chile he became temporary governor of the Kingdom of Chile after the death of Antonio de Guill y Gonzaga on 24 August 1768. He then campaigned against the continuing Mapuche Uprising of 1766 on the frontier in person until 3 March 1770 when the new Royal Governor Don Francisco Javier de Morales took over the position. He retired in January 1773, and died on 30 May 1778.

== Additional information ==
=== Sources ===
- Medina, José Toribio (1906). Diccionario Biográfico Colonial de Chile (PDF) (in Spanish). Santiago, Chile: Imprenta Elzeviriana. p. 107.

Government offices
| Preceded by Antonio de Guill y Gonzaga | Royal Governor of Chile; 1768–1770 | Succeeded by Francisco Javier de Morales |
