= José Baquíjano y Carrillo, Count of Vistaflorida =

Spanish/Peruvian economist, jurist, writer, politician, and intellectual

José Javier de Baquíjano y Carrillo de Córdoba
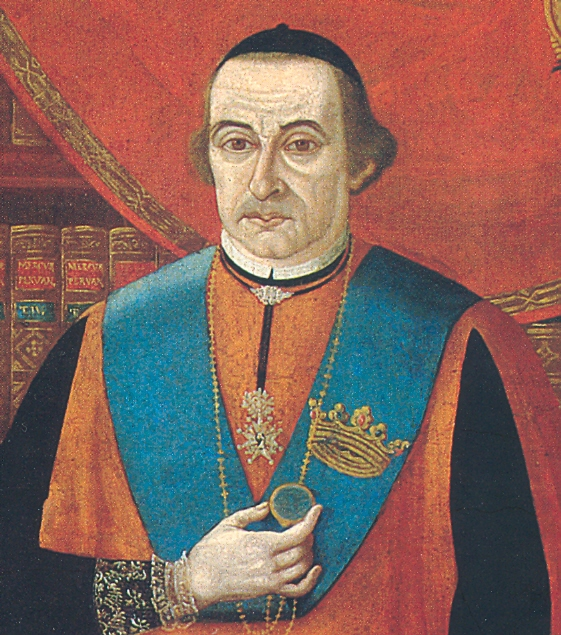
- José Baquíjano y Carrillo de Córdoba
- Born: March 12, 1751; Lima, Peru
- Died: January 24, 1817 (aged 65); Seville, Spain
- Education: University of San Marcos

José Javier de Baquíjano y Carrillo de Córdoba, 3rd Count of Vistaflorida (March 12, 1751, Lima, Peru—January 24, 1817, Seville, Spain) was a Spanish/Peruvian economist and jurist, writer and politician, and one of the first great intellectuals of the Viceroyalty of Peru. He was a supporter of liberalism.

== Early years ==
Born in Lima in 1751, he was the second son of Juan Bautista de Baquíjano y Urigoen, 1st Count of Vistaflorida, and María Ignacia Carrillo de Córdova y Garcés de Mansilla. His siblings were among others Juan Agustín, 2nd Count of Vistaflorida, and Josefa, Countess of San Javier and wife of Francisco Gil de Taboada, viceroy of Peru.

Baquíjano first attended the Real Colegio de San Martín but after the Jesuits were expelled from Peru he was transferred to the Seminary of Santo Toribio, where he was a pupil of Agustín de Gorrichátegui. A brilliant student, Baquíjano gained a reputation for academic excellence in the University of San Marcos, where he studied arts, theology and canon law.

In 1765, he successively obtained a bachelor's degree in canon law and a doctorate, degrees he received when he was thirteen and fourteen years old, respectively. He is the youngest person who has obtained a doctor's in San Marcos history. He was examined and admitted as an attorney by the Real Audiencia de Lima in 1769.

== El elogio a Jáuregui ==
He was celebrated for his speech welcoming the new viceroy Agustín de Jáuregui to Lima in 1780. This was published in 1781 as El elogio a Jáuregui, and was mixed with strong criticism of the viceregal government. His veiled attack on the economic and Indigenous policy of Visitador (Royal Inspector) José Antonio de Áreche was unprecedented. He quoted Montesquieu, Raynal, Machiavelli y Las Casas in defense of his positions. Áreche called his doctrines "execrable". The Argentine Balthasar Maciel attempted a rebuttal of the speech.

== Economic thought ==
Baquíjano was a mercantilist economic thinker, although he was also influenced by the English economist Josiah Child, a qualified exponent of free trade. Baquíjano believed that free trade and the separation of the Viceroyalty of Río de la Plata were the causes of the economic crisis in Peru at the end of the eighteenth century. He supported the position that the Peruvian economy depended on the export of precious metals.

== Academic and literary work ==
He led a reformist group at the University, arguing for the replacement of Scholasticism with the thought of men such as Descartes, Newton and Juan Heinecio. This group also supported the Encyclopedists and freedom of the press. In 1783 Baquíjano lost an election for rector. Thus he was not able to put his reforms into effect in the University, but he did so in the Colegio de San Carlos. He became vice-rector of San Marcos in 1791.

From 1791 to 1795 he was editor of the Mercurio Peruano, which rejected the radicalism of the French Revolution. In the Mercurio, Baquíjano published histories of the Audiencia of Lima, of the University, and of the mines in Potosí, as well as a dissertation on the economy of Peru. In 1793 he became president of the Sociedad Académica de Amantes del País (Academic Society of Lovers of the Country).

== Politics ==
He returned to Spain for some years around this time. In Cádiz he became friends with Bernardo O'Higgins. He was the mentor of a Criollo political movement seeking autonomy for the colony and equality between Criollos and Peninsulares.

Back in Lima, he became oidor (judge) of the Audiencia in 1807. Also that year he became third count of Vistaflorida. In 1814 he was in Madrid, and that year he became a magistrate of the Council of the Indies. Later he became an honorary council member.

He criticized the Spanish policy against the insurgents in Peru, calling it foolish and arguing for an end of hostilities. Yet he was a loyalist in his way, not a separatist. He argued for judicial, ecclesiastical and economic autonomy, but under the Crown of Spain. Still, his strong criticism of the viceregal system and his support of liberal principles lent support to the independence movement. For that reason, he is recognized as a precursor of Peruvian independence.
