= Antonio de Guill y Gonzaga =

18th-century Spanish colonial administrator in Panama and Chile

Royal Governor of Panama
- In office 25 June 1758 – 13 October 1761
- Monarch: Ferdinand VI
- Preceded by: Manuel de Montiano
- Succeeded by: José Roan

Royal Governor of Chile
- In office 3 October 1762 – 24 August 1768
- Monarch: Charles III
- Preceded by: Félix de Berroeta
- Succeeded by: Juan de Balmaseda

Personal details
- Born: Spain
- Died: 24 August 1768 Santiago, Chile

Antonio de Guill y Gonzaga (died 24 August 1768) was a Spanish colonial administrator who served as Royal Governor of Panama and Royal Governor of Chile.

== Arauco War ==
Governor Guill y Gonzaga celebrated the "Parliament of Nacimiento" with the Mapuches in 1764, where he tried to impose his scheme to make them live in towns. This provoked the Mapuche uprising of 1766 under the command of the toqui Curiñancu, which lasted until Agustín de Jáuregui made a peace in 1774.

In addition he was ordered to carry out the expulsion of the Jesuits on 27 August 1767, from Chile.

During his government, he declared Talcahuano as a “Port of registry". In 1765 he founded the Villa San Luis Gonzaga de Rere and Tucapel Nuevo, the following year San Carlos de Yumbel was founded, all of them in the region of Concepcion. On Chiloé, San Carlos de Chonchi was founded in 1767 and San Carlos de Ancud in 1768.

He died in Santiago on 24 August 1768. He was succeeded by Juan de Balmaseda y Censano Beltrán as the interim governor.

== See also ==
- Arauco War
- Suppression of the Society of Jesus
- Manuel de Montiano

== Sources ==
- Castedo, Leopoldo (1954). Resumen de la Historia de Chile de Francisco Antonio Encina (in Spanish). Vol. 2. Santiago, Chile: Empresa Editora Zig-Zag.
- Encina, Francisco Antonio (1940–1952). Historia de Chile: desde la prehistoria hasta 1891 (in Spanish). Vol. I–XX. Santiago, Chile: Editorial Nascimento.
- Guarda, Gabriel (1978). El Auge Fundacional. Historia urbana del Reino de Chile (in Spanish). Santiago, Chile: Editorial Andrés Bello.
- Medina, José Toribio (1906). Diccionario Biográfico Colonial de Chile (PDF) (in Spanish). Santiago, Chile: Imprenta Elziviriana. pp. 383–384 of 1006.
- Molina, Juan Ignacio (1809). The Geographical, Natural, and Civil History of Chili. Vol. II. London, UK: Longman, Hurst, Rees, and Orme.

Government offices
| Preceded by Manuel de Montiano | Royal Governor of Panama; 1758–1761 | Succeeded by José Roan |
| Preceded by Félix de Berroeta | Royal Governor of Chile; 1762–1768 | Succeeded by Juan de Balmaseda |
