= Domingo Ortiz de Rosas, 1st Marquis of Poblaciones =

Spanish soldier

Domingo Ortiz de Rozas
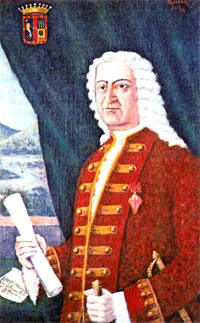
- portrait of Domingo Ortiz de Rozas

Governor of Buenos Aires
- In office 1741–1742
- Monarch: Philip V of Spain
- Preceded by: Miguel de Salcedo
- Succeeded by: José de Andonaegui

Personal details
- Born: 1683 Soba, Cantabria, Spain
- Died: 1756 (aged 72–73) Drake Passage, Spanish Empire
- Occupation: politician
- Profession: Army officer

Military service
- Allegiance: Spanish Empire
- Branch/service: Spanish Army
- Years of service: c.1705–1756
- Rank: General
- Battles/wars: War of the Spanish Succession

Domingo Ortiz de Rosas y García de Villasuso, 1st Marquis of Poblaciones (Spanish: Domingo Ortiz de Rosas y García de Villasuso, primer Marqués de Poblaciones) (1683–1756) was a Spanish soldier who served as governor of Chile.

== As Governor of Chile ==
Ortiz de Rosas was Governor from 1746 to 1755, during which time he moved the city of Concepción from its old location (today's city of Penco) to its current place. In addition, he founded a number of cities:

- Casablanca (Santa Bárbara de Casablanca)
- Coelemu (Villa Jesús de Coelemu)
- La Ligua (Santo Domingo de Rosas de la Ligua)
- Petorca (Santa Ana de Briviescas)
- Quirihue (San Antonio Abad de Quirihue)

Other notable acts undertaken during his government were the creation, on March 11, 1747, of the first University in the colonial territory of Chile: the Royal University of San Felipe (Real Universidad de San Felipe), of which the first rector was Tomás de Azúa e Iturgoyen. This university would eventually become today's Universidad de Chile. He also established the penal colony on the Juan Fernández Islands.

== Death ==
While on board the Spanish ship Leon, en route to Europe with his family, Ortiz de Rosas died on 29 June 1756. The ship's log records his age as 80. He was buried at sea the following morning.

Government offices
Preceded by Miguel de Salcedo	Royal Governor of Buenos Aires; 1742–1745	Succeeded by José de Andonaegui
Preceded by Francisco José de Ovando	Royal Governor of Chile; 1746–1755	Succeeded by Manuel de Amat y Juniet
Spanish nobility
Preceded by New creation	Marquis of Poblaciones; 1747–1756	Succeeded by José Ortiz de Rozas
