= Santo Domingo Church, Santiago de Chile =

Santo Domingo Church
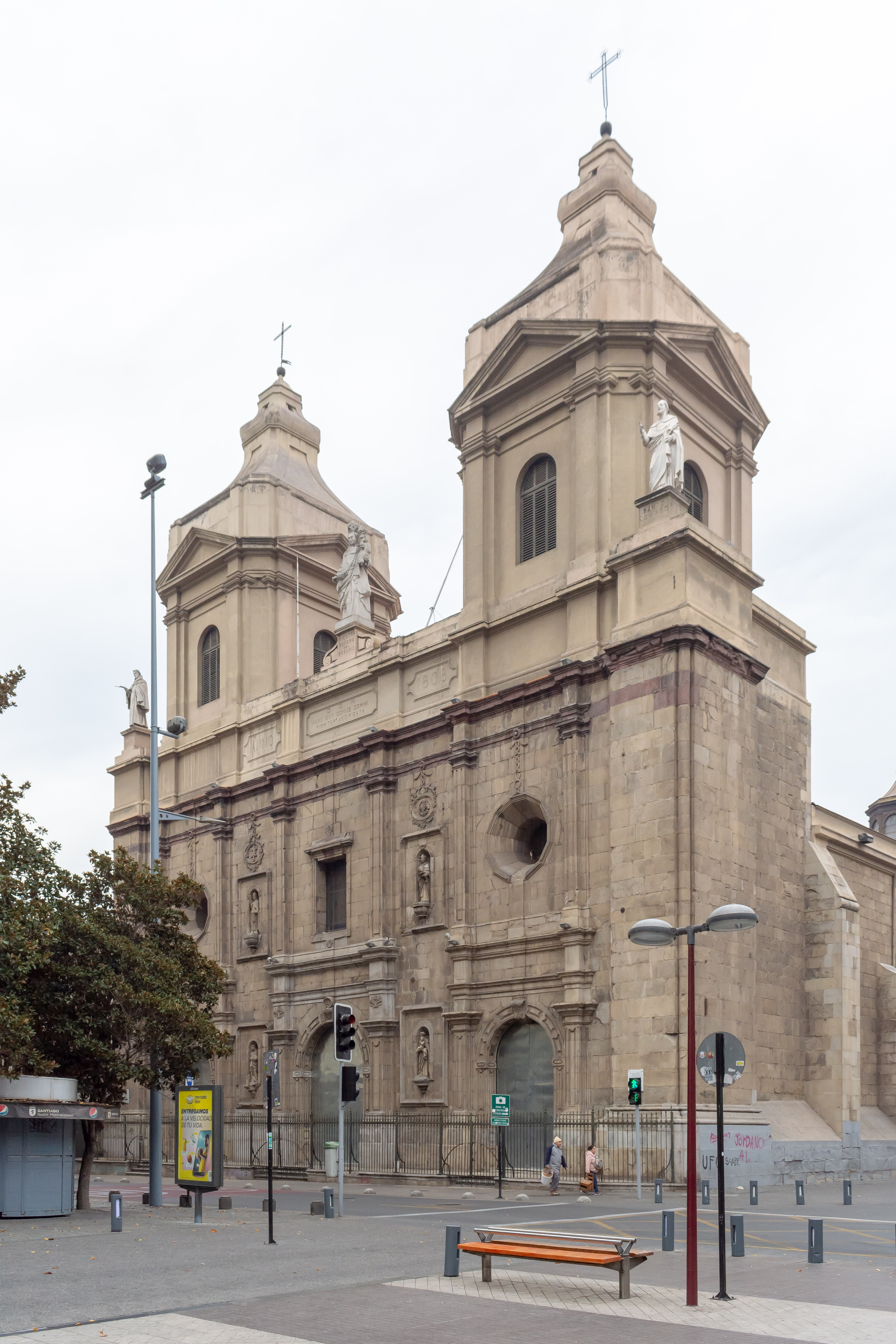

- Location within Chile

Religion
- Affiliation: Catholic
- Sect: Dominican Order

Location
- Location: 21 de Mayo Street, Santiago de Chile
- Country: Chile
- Interactive map of Santo Domingo Church
- Coordinates: 33°26′08.49″S 70°39′01.07″W

The Santo Domingo Church (Spanish: Iglesia de Santo Domingo) is a Dominican church in the historical downtown of Santiago de Chile. It is located at the corner of Santo Domingo Street and 21 de Mayo Street.

== History ==
The present structure is the fourth church built on the same site to house the Dominican congregation in Santiago. Earthquakes in 1595, 1647, and 1730 destroyed the early churches.

The fourth church began to be constructed in 1747 under the design of architect Juan de los Santos Vasconcellos. Joaquín Toesca worked on its construction between 1795 and 1796.

The church has suffered two important fires. The first occurred in 1895 and the second fire occurred in 1963, which destroyed the interior of the church.

== Architecture ==
The main body of the church is built in ashlar masonry. The bell towers are constructed of clay brick masonry covered with stucco. The front facade features pilasters and statues set in niches. The attic is surmounted by three statues.

== See also ==
- Roman Catholicism in Chile
