= Joaquín Toesca =

Italian architect (1745–1799)

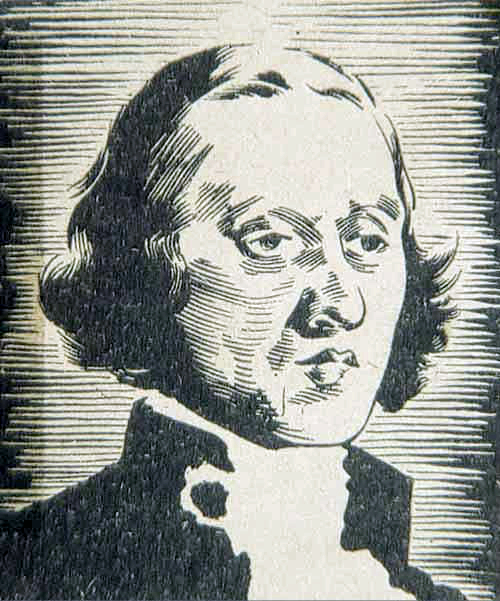
Idealized portrait of Joaquín Toesca

Gioacchino Toesca e Ricci (1745–1799; known as Joaquín Toesca in the Spanish Empire) was an Italian architect who worked at the service of the Spanish Empire, mainly in Chile. He was mainly a Neoclassical architect although he also built Baroque buildings.

== Biography ==
Gioacchino Toesca was born in 1745 in Rome. He studied architecture as a student of Francesco Sabatini and at the age of 15, he moved to Madrid and later completed his studies in mathematics in Barcelona.

== Chilean architecture ==
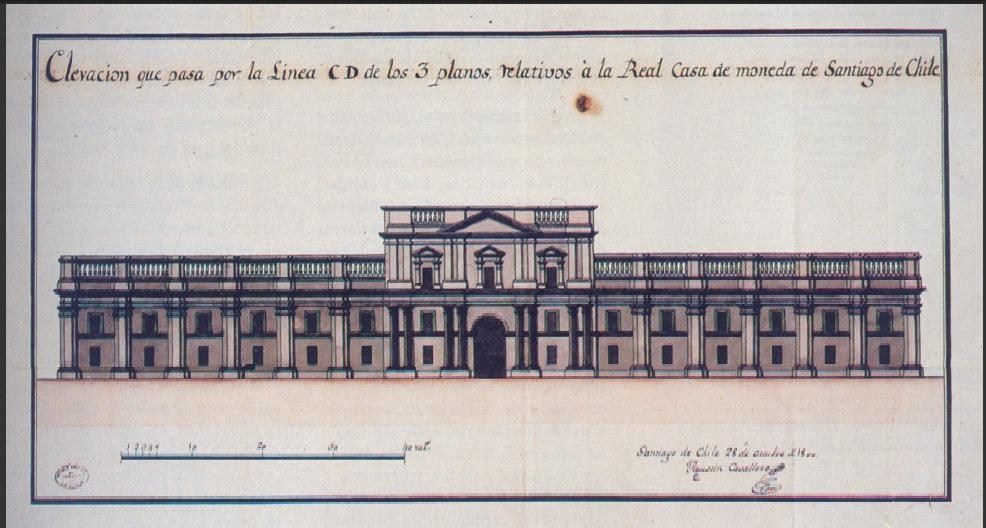
Elevation of the Palacio de la Moneda in Santiago, Chile. Drawing by Agustín Cavallero, 1800. General Archive of the Indies, Seville.

In 1780 he traveled to South America, to Santiago in the colonial Captaincy General of Chile at the request of the Royal Governor Agustín de Jáuregui and the Archbishop Santiago Manuel de Alday y Aspée, who engaged him to design the Catedral de Santiago de Chile (present day Santiago Metropolitan Cathedral). In addition to this project he was also occupied in developing the plans for the Palacio de la Moneda to house the royal mint, which later became Chile's presidential palace.

Toesca died in 1799 and did not live to see his two major projects, the Cathedral and the Palacio, completed. However, he did finish a number of other smaller works, including the Cabildo de Santiago (city hall) of the Santiago Cabildo, the San Juan de Dios Hospital, and the tajamares (levees) which would prove crucial in protecting the city from the floods of the Mapocho River. He also worked on the construction of the Santo Domingo Church, Santiago. His designs were generally in the neoclassical style of the period. His creative influence on Santiago—directly and through his many students—is notable.
