= Manuel de Guirior =

Spanish naval officer and colonial administrator

Manuel de Guirior Marquess of Guirior
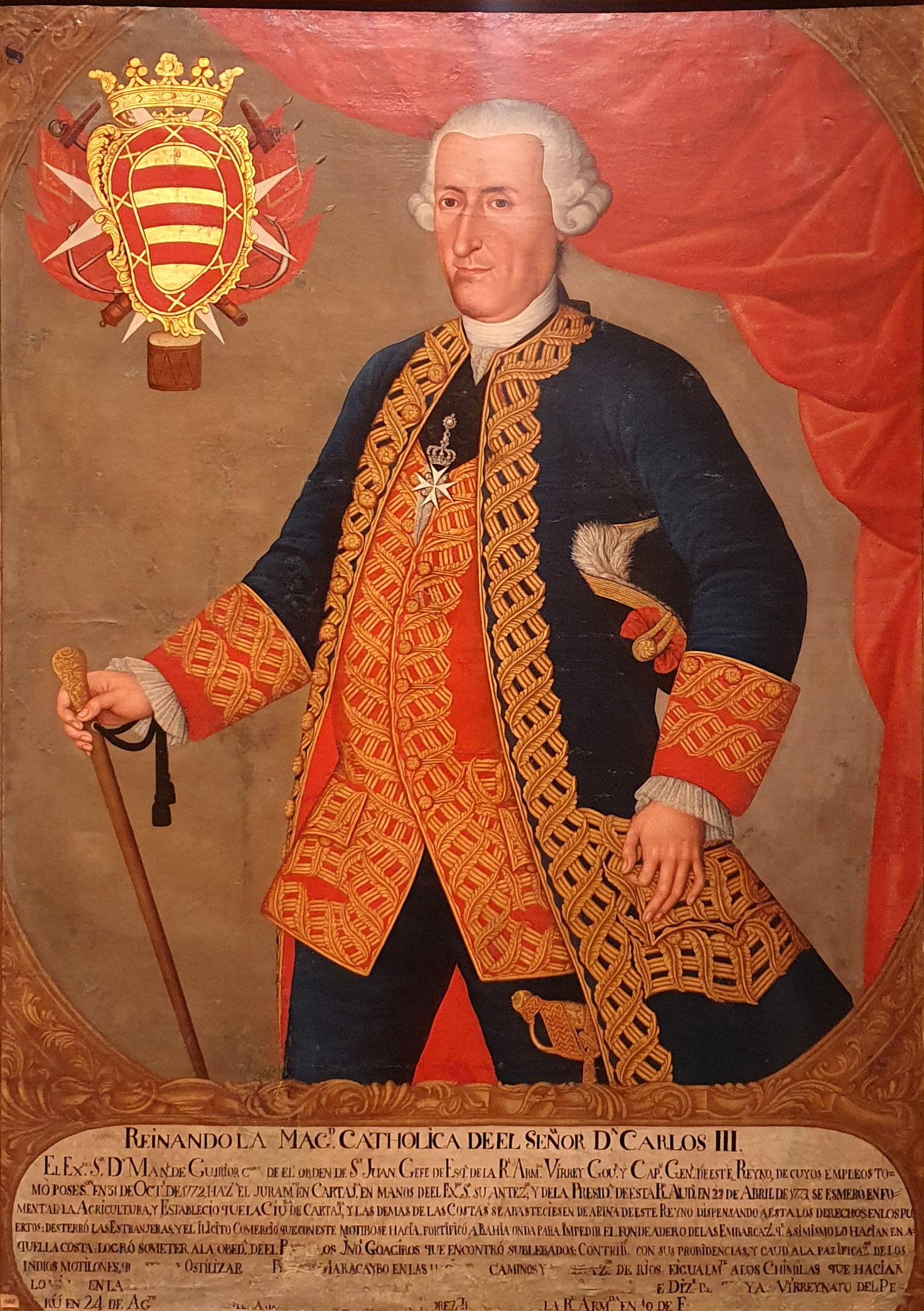

32nd Viceroy of Peru
- In office July 17, 1776 – July 21, 1780
- Monarch: Charles III
- Preceded by: Manuel de Amat y Juniet
- Succeeded by: Agustín de Jáuregui

Personal details
- Born: 1708 Aoiz
- Died: November 25, 1788 (aged 79–80) Madrid

Manuel de Guirior (in full, Manuel de Guirior y Portal de Huarte y Edozain, marqués de Guirior) (1708 – November 25, 1788) was a Spanish naval officer and colonial administrator. He was viceroy of New Granada from 1772 to 1776 and of Peru from July 17, 1776, to July 21, 1780.

Guirior was born into a noble family of Navarre. He entered the navy in 1733 as a lieutenant. He fought in the Seven Years' War against the English, and also against the Berbers in the Mediterranean. He was a knight of the Order of St. John.

Guirior was married to Maria Ventura de Guirior, to whom he presented a noted emerald and diamond parure. On his death in 1788, his titles passed to his great-nephew Don José Maria de Guirior and Larrea.

== As viceroy of New Granada ==
In 1772 he was named viceroy of New Granada. As viceroy, he tried to reform the religious communities, revitalize the missions, and insure more humanitarian treatment of the Indigenous. He worked to improve the economy and stimulate industry. He divided the city of Bogotá into barrios (boroughs).

He also improved the defenses of the colony, especially on the coast. He founded the Real Universidad de Santafé, as well as a hospital and a hospice. On July 20, 1773, he founded the first public library in the colony, in Bogotá. The original collection of the library consisted of books expropriated from the Jesuit community, which had been expelled from all dominions of the Spanish Empire by order of King Charles III of Spain in 1767. The new library opened on January 9, 1777. It is now the Biblioteca Nacional de Colombia (National Library of Colombia).

In 1774 Guirior was promoted to lieutenant general.

== As viceroy of Peru ==
He was named viceroy of Peru in 1775, and in 1776 he arrived in Lima and took up the position. He assisted the scientific expedition of Hipólito Ruiz López, José Antonio Pavón and Joseph Dombey, sent to study the flora of the viceroyalty. Their findings were later published as La flora peruana y chilena (The Flora of Peru and Chile). Again a major concern was stimulating the economy, which he did by adopting liberal measures in agriculture, mining, commerce and industry.

He gained a reputation as a man of intelligence and compassion, and a tireless worker. He created two new chairs at the university, improved the medical care at ten hospitals in Lima and established a foundling home.

In June 1777 José Antonio de Areche arrived in Lima as visitador (inspector) from the Crown. He increased the sales tax from 4% to 6%, and Viceroy Guirior imposed a 12½% tax on liquor. Disagreements with Visitador Areche led to Guirior's removal from office in July 1780. He was subjected to a juicio de residencia (trial of grievances) and his pension was halved. However, he was acquitted posthumously. (He died on November 25, 1788.) He was replaced as viceroy by the governor of Chile, Agustín de Jáuregui.

At the time of Guirior's removal from office, the Indigenous of Peru were on the verge of revolt. The revolt, led by Túpac Amaru II, broke out on November 4, 1780.

Government offices
Preceded by Pedro Messía de la Cerda	Viceroy of New Granada; 1773–1776	Succeeded by Manuel Antonio Flores
Preceded by Manuel de Amat y Juniet	Viceroy of Peru; 1776–1780	Succeeded by Agustín de Jáuregui
