= Félix de Berroeta =

Royal Governor of Chile

Félix de Berroeta was appointed as interim Royal Governor of Chile between September 1761 and October 1762 during the reign of Charles III of Spain.

Government offices
Preceded by Manuel de Amat y Juniet	Royal Governor of Chile; 1761–1762	Succeeded by Antonio de Guill y Gonzaga
