= José Antonio de Areche =

Spanish visitador in Peru

José Antonio de Areche Zornoza (1731–1788) was a Spanish visitador in Peru (1777–82). He was responsible for the execution of Inca rebel Túpac Amaru II, his family and coconspirators.

== Background ==
Before his arrival in Peru, José Antonio de Areche was fiscal (prosecutor) before the Audiencia of Mexico. He was a follower of José de Gálvez, and adopted Gálvez's policy of reformismo duro (hard reforms; the Bourbon reforms). In New Spain he worked for the suppression of the guilds (the Consulado de Mexico). Viceroy Antonio María de Bucareli y Ursúa signed some measures against them.

José de Gálvez became Spanish minister of the Indies in 1776, and the following year he ordered Areche to Peru as royal visitador (inspector). This was the same sort of post that Gálvez himself had exercised a decade earlier in New Spain.

== As visitador in Peru ==
In June 1777, Areche arrived in Lima. As a direct representative of the king, he believed he outranked the highest colonial officials of the Viceroyalty of Peru and the newly created Viceroyalty of the Río de la Plata. His mission was to increase the revenues of the colony, investigate the honesty and competence of colonial officials and the general state of the colony, and institute legal proceedings and administrative reforms as he deemed necessary.

He increased the alcabala (sales tax) from 4 to 6%. The economy of the colony was bad, in part because of the separation of the Viceroyalty of the Río de la Plata from Peru in 1776 and the imposition of free trade in 1778. The tax increase (and other increases, such as internal customs duties and the extension of tribute payments from the Indigenous to the Mestizos) were intended to increase government revenues during an economic downturn, but they were viewed as oppressive by the poor, by the merchants, and particularly by the Indigenous. For the first year after their implementation, government revenues rose. (They had been falling for a long time.) Then the reaction began.

Areche's authoritarian personality and contempt for Criollos in public service made him unpopular. Viceroy Manuel de Guirior refused to give up total authority. Areche brought charges against him, leading to his dismissal in July 1780. Guirior was replaced as viceroy by Agustín de Jáuregui. He was eventually acquitted of the charges, but only after his death in 1788.

== The revolt of Túpac Amaru II ==
In 1780 the new viceroy and the visitador were confronted with a series of rebellions involving not only the Indigenous, but also Mestizos and Criollos. The most serious of these was led by Túpac Amaru II (José Gabriel Condorcanqui). He was a direct descendant of the earlier Túpac Amaru, the last Inca (Emperor) of Vilcabamba, who had been beheaded on the orders of Viceroy Francisco de Toledo in 1572. Túpac Amaru II was cacique of Tungasuca, Surimana and Pampamarca, and enjoyed properties, businesses and prestige in the region of Cusco. He was 40 years old when he led the rebellion, tired of the abuses of the corregidores and merchants and of the reforms of Areche (customs, taxes, tributes).

Túpac Amaru had been organizing a conspiracy since 1778. The revolt began on November 4, 1780, near Cusco. On that date, he captured and condemned to the gallows the corregidor of Tinta, Antonio de Arriaga. The same day he spoke to thousands of followers at Tungasuca, announcing the abolition of mita (forced labor), obraje (another form of forced labor), black slavery, the sales tax and the corregidors. General José del Valle left Cusco with an army of 17,116 men. Túpac Amaru was betrayed and captured. He had raised 60,000 men in revolt.

== The sentencing and execution of Túpac Amaru II ==
Túpac Amaru was arrested and tried in 1781. Areche was in charge of the trial and sentencing, and he ordered the execution. The sentence was carried out on May 18, 1781, in the main plaza in Cusco. Other rebels were executed between 1781 and 1783.

In delivering his judgment, Areche also ordered the following:

- The Indigenous were prohibited from wearing traditional clothes, and such clothes were ordered confiscated
- All paintings of the Incas (emperors) in public or private places, including homes, were ordered to be destroyed
- Plays or other public functions commemorating the Incas were prohibited, and the Spanish officials were required to make official reports on the progress of this suppression
- Traditional trumpets or bugles (made from seashells) were banned, on the grounds that their mournful music was a form of mourning for deceased ancestors and former times
- No one was allowed to call himself Inca (meaning the emperor or royal family rather than the nationality)
- Schools were ordered established to teach Castilian to the Indians, and the Indians were ordered to attend
- The manufacture of cannons was prohibited, with a penalty of 10 years imprisonment in Africa, and (for commoners) 200 lashes

In April 1782, Spanish King Charles III, at the urging of the Visitador Areche, ordered viceregal officials in Peru and Argentina to seize as many copies of Inca Garcilaso de la Vega's Comentarios Reales de los Incas as they could find. First published in 1609, the second edition (1723) of the "Comentarios" included a prophecy attributed to Sir Walter Raleigh which claimed that "the Indians would overthrow the Spanish to usher in a return to the Inca Empire with the help of the British." (Cohen-Aponte, 2016, "Heaven, Hell and Everything in Between, pg. 147)

During the Tupac Amaru Revolution, Tupac Amaru II and other revolutionary leaders repeatedly referenced this and similar prophecies, leading to Areche's prohibition.

Areche continued as visitador until 1782.
