= Francisco José de Ovando, 1st Marquis of Brindisi =

Spanish soldier

Don Francisco José de Ovando Marquis of Brindisi

43rd Governor-General of the Philippines
- In office July 20, 1750 – July 26, 1754
- Monarch: Ferdinand VI
- First Secretary of State: José de Carvajal; Duke of Huéscar; Ricardo Wall
- Secretary of State for Indies: Marquess of Ensenada; Ricardo Wall
- Viceroy of New Spain: Juan Francisco de Güemes
- Preceded by: Juan de Arrechederra
- Succeeded by: Pedro Manuel de Arandía

55th Royal Governor of Chile
- In office June 28, 1745 – March 26, 1746
- Monarch: Philip V
- First Secretary of State: Marquess of Villarías
- Secretary of State for Indies: Marquess of Ensenada
- Preceded by: José Manso de Velasco
- Succeeded by: Domingo Ortíz de Rosas

Personal details
- Born: 1693 Caceres, Spain
- Died: December 9, 1755 (aged 61–62) At sea, Spain
- Profession: Brigadier General

Francisco José de Ovando y Solís Rol de La Cerda, 1st Marquis of Brindisi (Spanish: Francisco José de Ovando y Solís Rol de La Cerda, primer Marqués de Brindisi) (c. 1693 – December 9, 1755) was a Spanish soldier who served as Governor-General of the Philippines and governor of Chile.

== Early life ==
Francisco José de Ovando was born in the city of Caceres in Extremadura. In 1710, at the age of seventeen, he joined the Spanish Army as a cadet, and in 1717 he transferred to the naval infantry, as a member of which he participated in the capture of Sicily in July 1718, during the War of the Quadruple Alliance.

After a period of several years in which he returned to administrative work within the Spanish Army, he returned to the navy in 1728 as a lieutenant in charge of the frigate Génova. Two years later, he was commissioned to study naval construction at Cádiz. In 1731, he was given the command of the frigate Guipúzcoa, which as part of the fleet under Admiral Cornejo, took part in the attack to Livorno.

=== Capture of Brindisi ===
He was promoted to Captain in 1733 and took command of the frigate Galga, which as part of the fleet of the Marquis of Clavijo captured Naples during the War of the Polish Succession. In 1734 he was sent to capture the castle of Brindisi near Tarento. In that opportunity, he personally landed and led a force composed of 200 men from his ship and 100 naval infantry to capture the fortress. After the battle he sailed back to Naples, where he was personally congratulated by the Infante Don Carlos for his outstanding valor and performance in battle, and was rewarded with the title of Marquis of Brindisi (in most literature he appears credited as Marquis of Ovando, which is simply a corruption of his title and his last name), was promoted to Lieutenant Colonel and was given the command of the Man-of-war El León, of seventy cannons.

In 1736, Ovando took command of the frigate San Cayetano, which he sailed to Veracruz to join the Windward Fleet (Spanish: Flota de Barlovento), and was sent to the Antilles to root out smugglers and European traders, mainly British and Dutch, who were violating the monopoly of the Spanish Main. In 1740 he participated, with his ship Dragón, in the defense of Cartagena de Indias from the British attack of Admiral Vernon.

The Spanish Prime Minister Marquis of Ensenada promoted Ovando in 1743 to Fleet Commander, charging him with the inspection of all the fortresses, harbors and arsenals in the Viceroyalty of Peru as inspector and commander-in-chief of the Southern Seas' Fleet (3).

== As Governor of Chile ==
Francisco José de Ovando was appointed interim Governor of Chile by his predecessor José Antonio Manso de Velasco, who had been promoted to Viceroy of Peru and whom he had travelled to Valparaíso to escort back to Peru. He took over his position on July 28, 1745 and remained there until March 26 of the following year, when his successor, Domingo Ortiz de Rosas, arrived. He immediately returned to his fleet command on board of the ship San Fermín and departed to chart the Juan Fernández Islands.

On October 26, 1746, he was eyewitness of the devastating Lima-Callao earthquake of which he (and his family) was one of the few survivors.

Other notable acts undertaken during his government were the creation, on March 11, 1747, of the first University in the colonial territory of Chile: the Royal University of San Felipe (Real Universidad de San Felipe), of which the first rector was Tomás de Azúa e Iturgoyen. This university would eventually become today's University of Chile.

== As Governor-General of the Philippines ==
He arrived in Manila on July 20, 1750 and immediately had trouble with the Audiencia and archbishop. He also dealt with Moros. His term ended in July 1754 and died at sea in 1755 on his way back to Acapulco. The town of Obando in the province of Bulacan, which he founded on May 14, 1753, was named after him.

=== Actions against Moro raiders ===
Ovando in October 1751; approved and allowed Privaters to enslave Moro Muslim men, women, children and to seize as much loot as they want from the Moros.

Ovando in 1745 also suggested to conquer the Islands of Jolo and Mindanao as a response to Moro raids, however peace was made in the same year

== See also ==
- Diego Fernández de Cáceres y Ovando
- War of the Quadruple Alliance
- War of the Polish Succession
- Seven Years' War
- War of Jenkins' Ear
- Blas de Lezo
- Battle of Cartagena de Indias
- Spanish ship Santísima Trinidad (1751)

== Sources ==
- Gómez, Santiago. "Historial del navío "Galga"". Todo a Babor (in Spanish).
- Medina, José Toribio (1906). Diccionario Biográfico Colonial de Chile (PDF) (in Spanish). Santiago, Chile: Imprenta Elzeviriana. p. 635.
- Ortiz de la Tabla Ducasse, F (1974). El marqués de Ovando, Gobernador de Filipinas (in Spanish). Escuela de Estudios Hispano-Americanos. Seville, Spain: CSIC.
- Silos Rodríguez, José María (21 April 2005). "Viaje de 1755 del Galeón "Santísima Trinidad"". Todo a Babor (in Spanish).

Government offices
Preceded by José Manso de Velasco	Royal Governor of Chile; 1745–1746	Succeeded by Domingo Ortiz de Rosas
Preceded by Juan de Arrechederra	Governor-General of the Philippines; 1750–1754	Succeeded by Pedro Manuel de Arandía
Spanish nobility
Preceded by New title	Marquis of Ovando; 1734–1755	Succeeded by Alonso de Ovando
