= Manuel de Alday y Aspée =

Chilean Roman Catholic priest

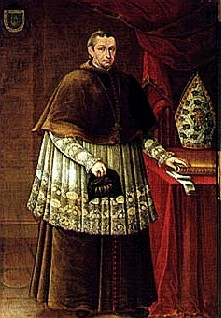
Manuel de Alday, after a portrait of 1772 by José Legarda, Lima.

Manuel de Alday y Aspée (1712 in Concepción – 1789 in Santiago) was a Chilean Roman Catholic priest. He served as Bishop of Santiago from 1755 to 1788. He is considered the most important bishop of Santiago during the eighteenth century.

== Moral diatribes ==
Alday is best remembered for his frequent polemics on moral issues, and campaigned against particular aspects of women's fashion at the time –such as short skirts reaching down to the calf of the leg or very short sleeves. He also opposed the opening of the theater in Santiago; he claimed that attending comedies there was a mortal sin. He also condemned the game known as palín or chueca, a form of field hockey of Mapuche origin, as well as the thick winter clothes worn by some clerics during cold weather, and the use of the sacramental bread by some people as a sealing wax on letters.

Alday, in a famous pastoral letter about women's fashions, ordered in 1782 that "...all women of whatever station or class extend the length of their clothes, employing round petticoats or half circle shaped skirts both inside and outside of their homes in a manner that reaches their ankles… and also, in the same manner, that women cover their arms up to the mid-point between the elbow and the wrist every time they leave the home or when they receive visitors at their home."

== Administrative work ==
In 1780, Alday revitalized the building program associated with the Santiago Metropolitan Cathedral, placing the program in the hands of the architect Joaquín Toesca. Alday was also concerned with the building of new churches in South America, including the third church built in the Marian sanctuary of Andacollo as well as the completion and consecration of the principal church in Mendoza, Argentina, in 1760.

Alday founded new parishes as he traveled across his extensive diocese, visiting, for example, Copiapó and Cuyo. He founded San Lázaro (1775) in the suburbs of Santiago, and parishes in more distant areas, such as Paredones (1765), Combarbalá (1757), Pelarco (1787) and Renca (1764).

He organized a diocesan synod in 1763, hoping to enact clerical reforms and discuss the immoral customs of his flock.

== Theological work ==
He received a good education, receiving a doctorate in Law at the University of San Marcos de Lima. He possessed one of the largest libraries in Chile during the colonial era of 2,058 volumes, which today is conserved in the Museum of Carmen de Maipú. He wrote various treatises and participated in a discussion on Probabilism, in the synod of Lima of 1772, in which he opposed this philosophy. He was a major participant in this synod.

=== Works ===
- Regla de la gloriosa virgen Santa Clara: según la observan las religiosas, que no son descalzas, aprobados por la santidad de Urbano IV (1773)
- Visitatio ad limina apostolorum Illmi. D. D. Emmanuelis de Alday Episcopi Chilensis, Catholicae Majestatis à Consiliis (1763)
- Synodo discesana (1763)
