= Manuel de Amat y Junyent =

Spanish military officer and colonial administrator

The Most Excellent Manuel de Amat OSJ OM
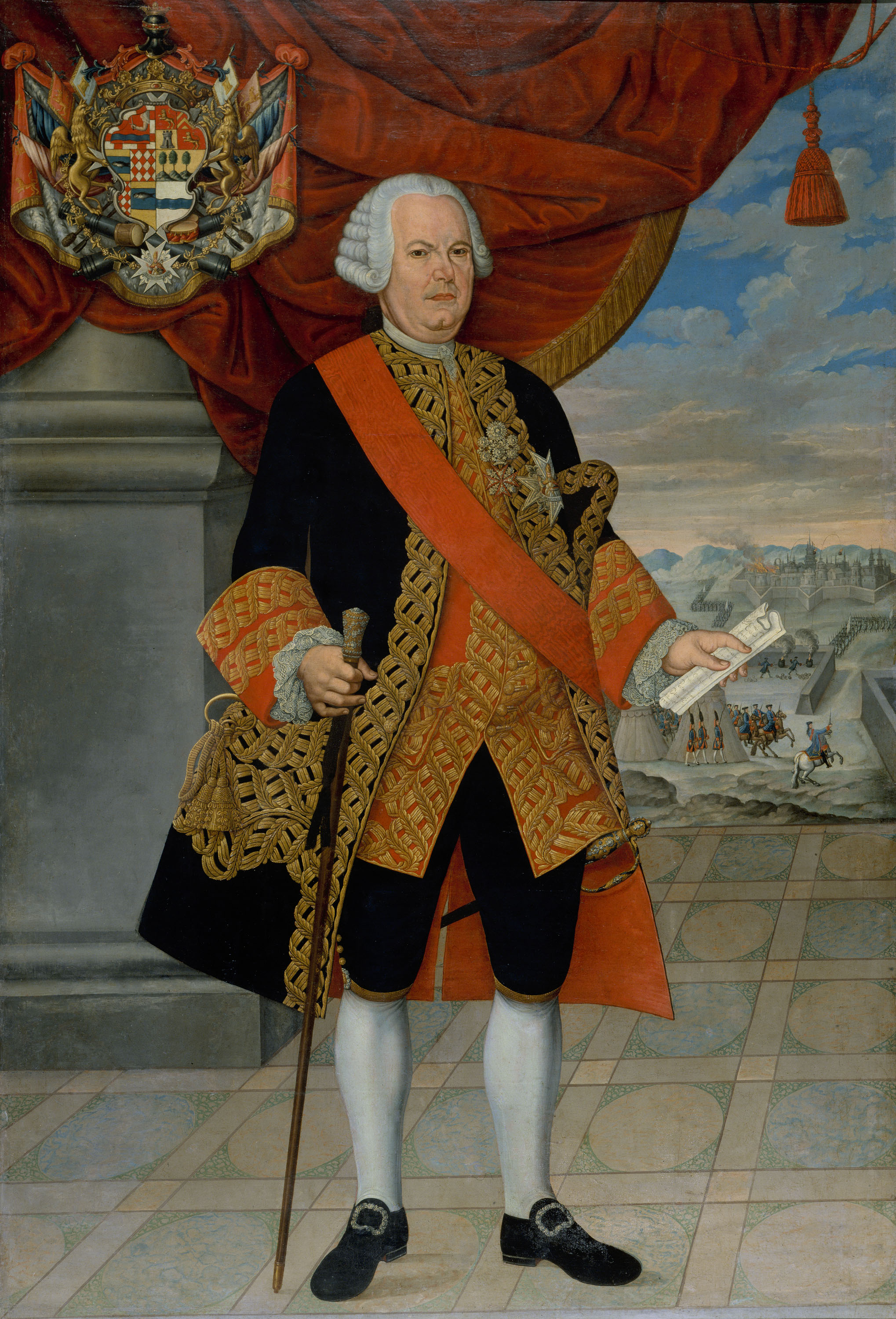
- Portrait of Amat as Viceroy of Peru, 1773

31st Viceroy of Peru
- In office October 12, 1761 – July 17, 1776
- Monarch: Charles III
- Prime Minister: Count of Aranda
- Preceded by: José Antonio Manso de Velasco
- Succeeded by: Manuel de Guirior

Royal Governor of Chile
- In office December 28, 1755 – September 9, 1761
- Monarch: Ferdinand VI
- Preceded by: Domingo Ortiz de Rosas
- Succeeded by: Félix de Berroeta

Personal details
- Born: 21 March 1707 Vacarisses, Spain
- Died: 14 February 1782 (aged 74) Barcelona, Spain
- Spouse: María Francisca de Fivaller
- Profession: Field Marshal
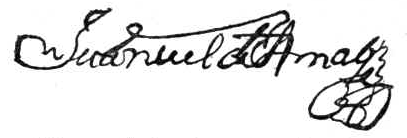
- Signature

Manuel de Amat y Junyent, OSJ, OM (Catalan: Manuel d'Amat i de Junyent) (March 1707 – February 14, 1782) was a Spanish military officer and colonial administrator. He was the Royal Governor of the Captaincy General of Chile from December 28, 1755, to September 9, 1761, and Viceroy of Peru from October 12, 1761, to July 17, 1776.

== Origins and military career ==
Felipe Manuel Cayetano de Amat y de Junyent was born in March 1707 in Vacarisses (Province of Barcelona), into an aristocratic Catalan family. His father was José de Amat y de Planella, 1st Marquess of Castellbell, and his mother was Mariana de Junyent y de Vergós, daughter of the Marquess of Castellmeià.

He entered the army at a young age. In 1719 he saw hostile action against the French in Aragon. At the age of 17 he joined the Order of Malta and went to the island, where he remained four years. He later served in the wars in northern Africa, and obtained the command of a regiment of dragoons.

He distinguished himself in the Battle of Bitonto in the Kingdom of Naples (May 25, 1734). There he served with the contingent under the command of the Carrillo de Albornoz, Duke of Montemar that defeated the Austrians at the Battle of Bitonto in the War of the Polish Succession. He also stood out in the siege of Gaeta later in 1734.

He was promoted to field marshal.

== Royal Governor of Chile ==
In 1755 Felipe Cayetano de Amat y de Junyent was sent to South America, as Royal Governor of the Captaincy General and president of the Audiencia Real of Chile. He traveled throughout colonial Chile, and ordered the construction of fortifications on the coast and along the frontier with the Mapuche people (for example, Santa Bárbara). He founded the towns of Talcamávida, Hualqui and Nacimiento, among others. He entered negotiations with the Mapuches, the first time in Salto del Laja in 1758, and another time in Santiago de Chile in February 1760. His goal was to guarantee the security of communications between Concepción and Chiloé, but he was only partly successful.

In Santiago he began important public works and administrative tasks, including improvements to bridges over the Río Mapocho, a market in the Plaza de Armas, and the reform of the Royal University of San Felipe (1757). On October 12, 1758, he established the first police force in Chile, called the Dragones de la Reina (Dragoons of the Queen). This name was retained until the independence of Chile. In 1812 the force was renamed the Dragones de Chile.

Amat asked for and got a juicio de residencia (trial of grievances). The outcome was in his favor.

== Viceroy of Peru ==
On October 12, 1761, Amat succeeded José Manso de Velasco, 1st Count of Superunda as Viceroy of Peru. He was followed by Manuel de Guirior, Marqués de Guirior on July 17, 1776. In September 1767, he executed the expulsion of the Jesuits missionaries from the Viceroyalty of Peru, following orders from the Crown. He established the first Regulation of Commerce and Organization of Customs rules, which led to the building of the customshouse in Callao.

He had the fortress of Real Felipe constructed in Callao, being finished in 1774. He founded the Royal College of San Carlos. He constructed various public works in Lima. Probably the most famous are the Alameda de los Descalzos and the Paseo de Aguas, in the district of Rímac. He also remodeled the Alameda de Acho. Also under his administration, the Plaza de Toros de Acho, the world's third oldest surviving bull ring, was built by Agustin de Landaburu. It was the first bull ring in Peru, and opened with a corrida and a great celebration on February 22, 1762.

Tradition says the Paseo de Aguas was built in honor of Amat's mistress, the actress Micaela Villegas, better known as La Perricholi, a Mestiza woman. The story is that when the viceroy asked her to become his mistress, she replied that she would when he laid the moon at her feet. Amat y Junient then ordered the construction of the Paseo de Aguas in front of her house. It is an aqueduct from the Rímac River with a fountain and a long, narrow reflecting pool, with a promenade along the sides of the pool. The night of the following full moon, he invited her to view it with him.

La Perricholi's life inspired painters, writers and musicians. It provided the basis for the Prosper Mérimée comic novella Le Carrosse du Saint-Sacrement, which in turn was the basis for both the Jacques Offenbach opéra bouffe La Périchole and the Jean Renoir 1953 film Le Carrosse d'or (The Golden Coach). She and the viceroy are also prominent characters in the Thornton Wilder novel The Bridge of San Luis Rey.

=== Expeditions ===
To avoid the establishment of foreign bases from which attacks could be launched on Peru, Amat organized an expedition under the command of Domingo de Bonechea to Tahiti, which arrived just after that of Captain Cook, but in time to explore other islands in the group which Cook had not discovered. In subsequent voyages ordered by Amat, de Bonechea was the first European to explore most of French Polynesia.

Amat also sent an expedition under Juan Antonio de Buenechea to search for the doomed ship Oriflama, piloted by his kinsman Manuel de Buenechea.

== Last days ==
Between 1772 and 1778, Amat had built the Virreina Palace, in the city of Barcelona. The palace still stands on Barcelona's famous La Rambla, where it hosts various temporary art exhibitions and cultural events.

Amat returned home to Barcelona and his new palace on October 22, 1777. His only marriage was to María Francisca de Fivaller y de Bru in June 1779. He was 72 years old, and she 24. Felipe Manuel Cayetano de Amat y de Junyent died in Barcelona on February 14, 1782. His widow died on October 3, 1791. Amat had no legitimate children.

== Descendants ==
- With Micaela Villegas y Hurtado de Mendoza
  - Manuel Amat y Villegas
- With Mrs Josefa de Leòn y Riso, Countess of Castilla.
  - Manuel Amat y Leòn

Government offices
| Preceded by Domingo Ortiz de Rosas | Royal Governor of Chile; 1755–1761 | Succeeded by Félix de Berroeta |
| Preceded by José Antonio Manso de Velasco | Viceroy of Peru; 1761–1776 | Succeeded by Manuel de Guirior |
