= Agustín de Jáuregui =

Don Agustín de Jáuregui Caballero de Santiago
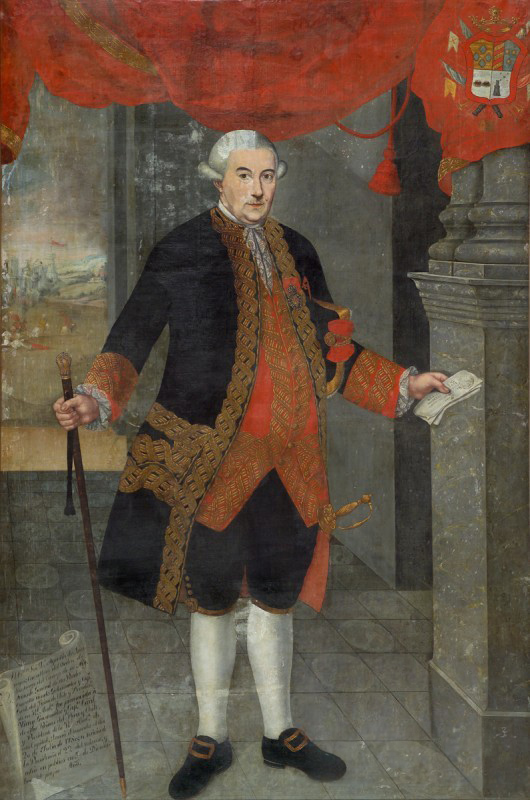

33rd Viceroy of Peru
- In office 20 July 1780 – 29 April 1784
- Monarch: Charles III
- Prime Minister: The Count of Aranda
- Preceded by: Manuel de Guirior
- Succeeded by: Teodoro de Croix

Royal Governor of Chile
- In office 6 March 1772 – 6 July 1780
- Monarch: Charles III
- Prime Minister: The Count of Aranda
- Preceded by: Francisco Javier de Morales
- Succeeded by: Tomás Álvarez

Personal details
- Born: 17 May 1711 Lecároz, Navarre, Spain
- Died: 29 April 1784 (aged 72) Lima, Peru
- Spouse: María Josefa Aróstegui
- Profession: Field Marshal

Agustín de Jáuregui y Aldecoa (17 May 1711 – 29 April 1784) was a Spanish politician and soldier who served as governor of Chile (1772–80) and viceroy of Peru (1780–84). He was born in Lekaroz in the Kingdom of Navarre, Spain in 1711. He traveled to South America in 1740 as a soldier serving at Cartagena de Indias. He was then appointed royal governor of Chile in 1772, and later moved to the Viceroyalty of Peru after of the end of his term in Chile in 1780.

== Early life ==
Jáuregui was born in Lecároz, the son of Matías de Jáuregui and of his wife, Juana María de Aldecoa.

At the age of 25 he entered the military, serving at Cartagena de Indias (now in Colombia) during the British siege in 1740. He rose to the rank of lieutenant general, and became a knight of the Order of Santiago.

Before his appointment as governor of Chile, he also served in Honduras, Puerto Rico and Cuba. In 1772, while resident in Spain, he was named governor by authority of King Charles III. In October of that year he embarked for Peru with his son Tomás. His wife, a native of Havana whom he had married there, remained in Spain.

== As governor of Chile ==
Jáuregui was governor of Chile from 6 March 1772 to 1780, during which time he promulgated a number of administrative and governmental reforms. For example, he set up a postal service on 29 April 1775. He oversaw Chile's first census, which established the population at 259,646 inhabitants, in 1778.

In June 1772 he introduced a severe ordinance intended to preserve public order. Individuals could not bear arms in public; theft of animals was to be punished by whipping; shopkeepers who did not close at the proper hour were subject to fines. With the agreement of Bishop Alday, he restricted the right of asylum in churches to only two, Santa Ana and San Isidro.

He introduced reforms of the tax-collection system in 1772. For many taxes he ended the farming system (collection by third parties, for a percentage of the revenue), and required that taxes be paid directly to the Crown. This included the customs. The reforms were opposed by the merchants, but Jáuregui put them into effect anyway.

He held a series of formal meeting with indigenous leaders. In April 1774 he met with their ambassadors in Santiago and he met with various leaders in the Parliament of Tapihue the following December. One of the things agreed to was the establishment of a school for the Indigenous, to be run by the Jesuits. This was the Colegio de San Pablo, which opened in April 1775 in Santiago.

Jáuregui presided over the beginning of construction of the cathedral of Santiago, under the direction of the Italian architect he recruited, Gioacchino Toesca. The cathedral was consecrated on 8 December 1775. Also, the Real Universidad de San Felipe enjoyed growth during his tenure. The Academy of Forensic Practice was established, and attached to the University.

In 1776 the Captaincy General of Chile suffered the loss of the province of Cuyo, including the cities of Mendoza, San Juan, and San Luis, due to the creation of the Viceroyalty of the Río de la Plata.

In 1777 Jáuregui established a militia system to defend against rural banditry and prepare for other military action, although each unit was required to finance uniforms and weapons itself. Two cavalry regiments, with 1,400 men, were created, and one new infantry regiment, with 800 men. In the professional army, the forces were redistributed along the frontier in Arauco, and in Santiago. He proposed better pay for the troops, and this was approved by Charles III in January 1778.

By royal order, free trade among various ports in Spain and America was adopted in 1778. Included were Valparaíso and Concepción in Chile. The order also authorized the route around Cape Horn. This was an important benefit for the colony.

Also in 1778 the Colegio de San Carlos was founded in Santiago. This replaced the Convictorio de San Francisco Javier, which had been administered by the Jesuits up until their expulsion.

In May 1778 the Mapocho River flooded.

== As viceroy of Peru ==
In 1780, Jáuregui was named viceroy of Peru. The reception in honor of his arrival (July 20) included a speech of welcome by the Peruvian intellectual José Baquíjano.

Almost before the celebrations in Lima in honour of his arrival had ended, he had to confront the insurrection of Túpac Amaru II (José Gabriel Condorcanqui). Túpac Amaru was a direct descendant of the earlier Túpac Amaru, the last Inca (Emperor) of Vilcabamba, who had been beheaded on the orders of Viceroy Francisco de Toledo in 1572. Túpac Amaru II was cacique of Tungasuca, Surimana and Pampamarca, and enjoyed properties, businesses and prestige in the region of Cusco. He was 40 years old when he led the rebellion, tired of the abuses of the corregidores and merchants and of the reforms of Visitador José Antonio de Areche (customs, taxes, tributes).

Túpac Amaru had been organizing a conspiracy since 1778. The revolt began on 4 November 1780. On that date, he captured and condemned to the gallows the corregidor of Tinta, Antonio de Arriaga. The same day he spoke to thousands of followers at Tungasuca, announcing the abolition of mita (forced labour), obraje (another form of forced labour), black slavery, the sales tax and the corregidors.

Jáuregui succeeded in defeating Túpac Amaru in 1781, and within a month he had been arrested and tried. On 18 May 1781 Túpac Amaru, his wife, and other leaders were executed. Túpac Amaru himself was torn into pieces by four horses, and the pieces were publicly displayed in various Indian towns as a warning to future rebels. Other rebels were brutally tortured and killed between 1781 and 1783. It is not known whether any descendants of the Inca emperors survived the repression.

However, discontent persisted amongst the native peoples because of abuse of the repartimiento and mita systems of labor tribute, which Jáuregui notified the court of. Jáuregui also busied himself in improving the defenses, the militia, and the postal service of the viceroyalty. He left his post on 6 April 1784, and a few days later died in an accident in Lima.

== Additional information ==
=== Sources ===
- Barros Arana, Diego (1886). Historia Jeneral de Chile (in Spanish). Vol. VI. Santiago, Chile: Rafael Jover. ISBN 9780598482334.
- Carvallo y Goyeneche, Vicente (1875). Miguel Luis Amunategui (ed.). Descripción Histórica y Geografía del Reino de Chile Vol. II (1626 - 1787). Coleccion de historiadores de Chile y documentos relativos a la historia nacional (in Spanish). Vol. IX (Instituto Chileno de Cultura Hispánica, Academia Chilena de la Historia ed.). Santiago, Chile: Imprenta de La Estrella de Chile. p. 483.
- Gay, Claudio (1848). Historia física y política de Chile (1749-1808) (in Spanish). Vol. IV. Paris, France: En casa del autor. p. 506.
- Medina, José Toribio (1906). Diccionario Biográfico Colonial de Chile (PDF) (in Spanish). Santiago, Chile: Imprenta Elzeviriana. pp. 126–127.
- Pérez García, José (1900). José Toribio Medina (ed.). Historia Natural, Militar, Civil y Sagrada del Reino de Chile (Vol. II) (PDF). Coleccion de historiadores de Chile y documentos relativos a la historia nacional (in Spanish). Vol. XXIII (Instituto Chileno de Cultura Hispánica, Academia Chilena de la Historia ed.). Santiago, Chile: Imprenta Elzeviriana.

Government offices
Preceded by Francisco Javier de Morales	Royal Governor of Chile; 1772–1780	Succeeded by Tomás Álvarez
Preceded by Manuel de Guirior	Viceroy of Peru; 1780–1784	Succeeded by Teodoro de Croix
Military offices
Preceded by Francisco Javier de Morales	Captain General of Chile; 1772–1780	Succeeded by Tomás Álvarez
