= Mapuche uprising of 1766 =

Conflict between the Spanish Empire and indigenous Mapuche (1766-67)

- Part of the Arauco War
Date	December 25, 1766 – February 1767
Location	Araucanía, La Frontera
Result	Spanish penetration into Araucanía reversed

Belligerents
Mapuche rebels	Spanish Empire; Pehuenche

Commanders and leaders
Curiñancu	Salvador Cabrito

The Mapuche uprising of 1766 was the last major Spanish–Mapuche conflict in Araucanía.

Under the influence of a young generation of Jesuits, Governor of Chile Antonio de Guill y Gonzaga attempted to "pacify" Araucanía by settling the unruly Mapuche into series of towns to be founded in their territory. Guill y Gonzaga called Mapuche chiefs to a parliament on December 8, 1764 which lasted until December 10 amidst festivities. In the parliament Mapuches did not accept, but avoided to decline explicitly, the governor's proposal to establish towns in lands. In early 1765 Guill y Gonzaga supervised the founding of a series of new towns near Bío Bío River, after which he returned north to Santiago. The governor spent much of 1766, from April to November, around Concepción attempting to speed up the founding of towns. Despite the Spanish authorities attempts to force the Mapuche to work in their plan, the Mapuche were unwilling to contribute to the founding of towns in their lands. The Mapuche consciously sought to delay works pretending to be in good terms with the Spanish while a grand uprising was prepared in secrecy.

Then on December 25, 1766, conspiring Mapuches launched a series of surprise attacks against Spanish settlements and property in general. Maestre de campo Salvador Cabrito was besieged in the town of Angol. On December 30 a relieving Spanish force arrived to Angol from Nacimiento breaking the siege and evacuating Angol which was abandoned as it was surrounded by hostile Mapuche. On January 1767 Pehuenches, a tribe inhabiting the Andes, attacked the lowland Mapuche. Possibly the Spanish may had instigated this attack. As the Mapuche appeared to have been content with reversing the Spanish penetration of the previous years the uprising evolved into an inter-indigenous conflict.

In February 1767, Guill y Gonzaga signed a peace agreement with revolting Mapuches.

In the austral spring of 1769, the Pehuenches turned their attacks against the Spanish in Isla del Laja.

== Bibliography ==
- Barros Arana, Diego (2000) [1886]. Historia General de Chile (in Spanish). Vol. VI (2 ed.). Santiago, Chile: Editorial Universitaria.
