= Pampamarca District, Canas =

Coordinates: 14.1453°S 71.4594°W

Pampamarca Pampamarka
- District
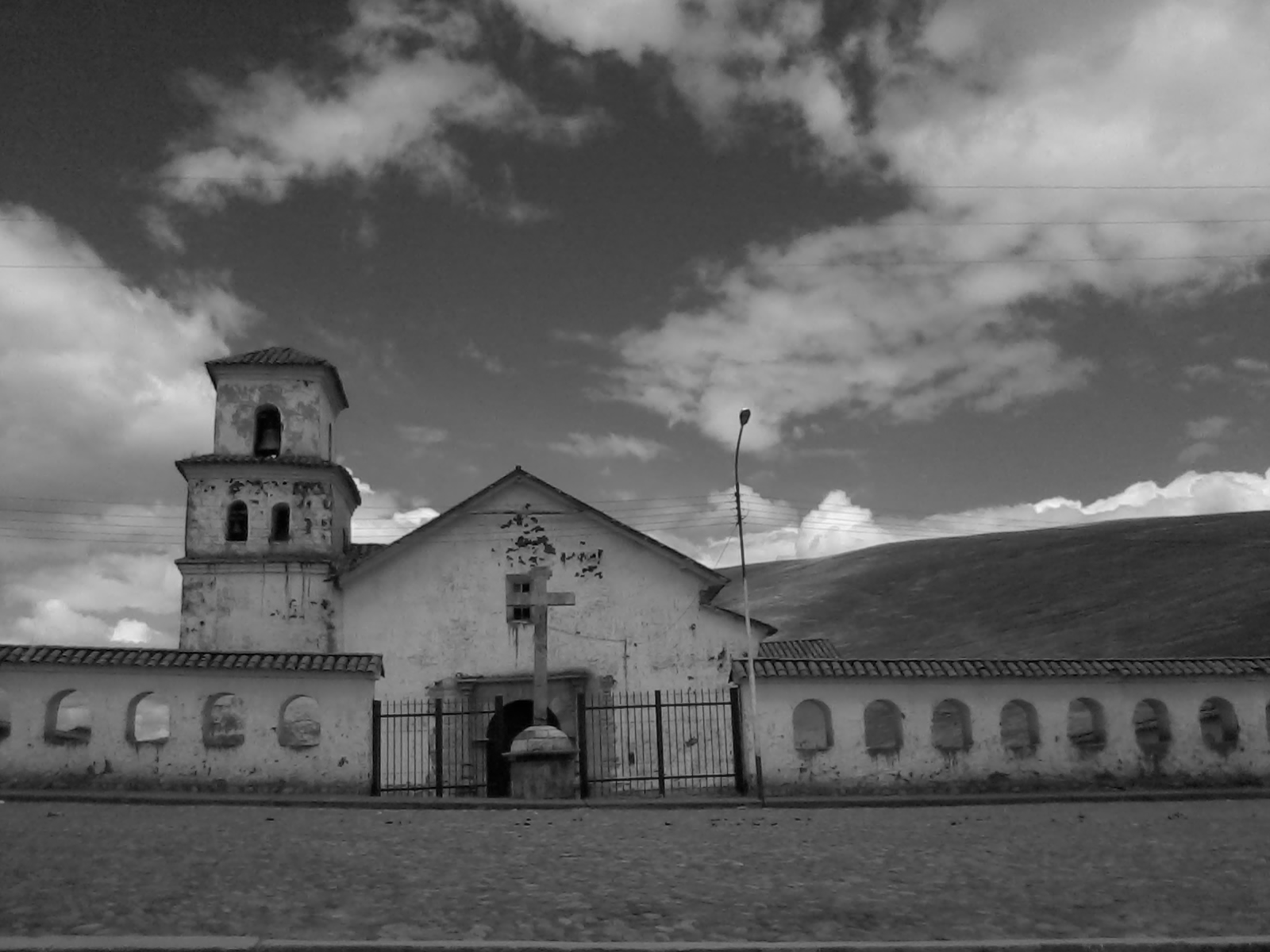
- Church of Pampamarca

- Location of Pampamarca in the Canas province
- Country: Peru
- Region: Cusco
- Province: Canas
- Founded: August 29, 1834
- Capital: Pampamarca

Government
  - Mayor: Eberardo Teheran Ayala (2007)

Area
  - Total: 29.91 km^{2} (11.55 sq mi)
- Elevation: 3,811 m (12,503 ft)

Population (2005 census)
  - Total: 2,268
  - Density: 75.83/km^{2} (196.4/sq mi)
- Time zone: UTC-5 (PET)
- UBIGEO: 080506

Pampamarca District is the smallest of eight districts in the Canas Province in Peru. Its seat is the village of Pampamarca.

== Ethnic groups ==
The people in the district are mainly indigenous citizens of Quechua descent. Quechua is the language which the majority of the population (86.85%) learnt to speak in childhood, 12.95% of the residents started speaking using the Spanish language (2007 Peru Census).
