= Royal University of San Felipe =

Predecessor to the University of Chile, founded in 1747

- Real Universidad de San Felipe
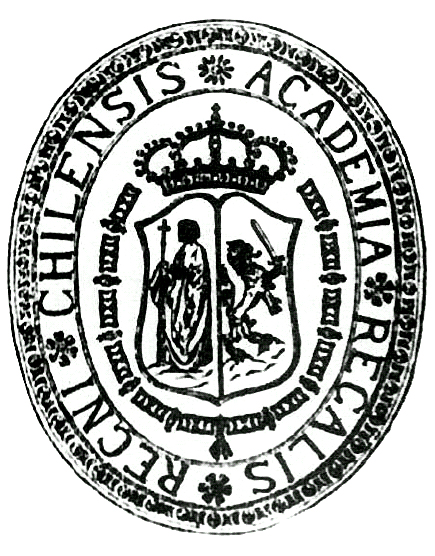
- Seal of the University
- Motto: Nox fugit historiæ lumen dum fulget chilensibus
- Motto in English: "Night flees, while the light of history shines for Chile"
- Active: 1713–1843
- Location: Santiago, Chile
- Predecessor of the University of Chile

The Royal University of San Felipe (Spanish: Real Universidad de San Felipe) was a university created by King Philip V in 1738, in territory which was then part of the Kingdom of Spain. It was officially founded in Santiago in 1747 and began teaching activities in 1758. It is the immediate predecessor of the University of Chile (1843).

== Origin ==
In the early 17th century the bishop of Santiago, Fray Juan Pérez de Espinosa, wrote to the King of Spain requesting a university for his city. He emphasized the benefits to the provinces of Buenos Aires, Tucumán, and Paraguay, and the fact that Chileans who were traveling to study at the University of San Marcos in Lima, Peru, rarely returned to Chile.

In a letter dated 2 December 1713 the mayor of Santiago, Francisco Ruiz de Berecedo, formally proposed to the cabildo (colonial council) to bring up to the King the request to authorize the creation of a university in Chile.

In 1724 the cabildo of Santiago named Manuel Antonio Valcarce Velasco as deputy procurator of the city before the Court of Spain, to carry out the decree.

In 1727 the cabildo appointed Tomás de Azúa as deputy procurator before the Court of Spain, to obtain the titles of cities (San Fernando, Linares), the creation of a mint, and the creation of the university. He achieved the latter by proposing to the King that it be financed by voluntary expenditures of the residents of Santiago.

On 28 July 1738, in San Ildefonso, Spain, King Philip V signed the Royal Decree of fundación, erección y establecimiento (foundation, erection and establishment) of a university in Santiago, under invocation of the patron saint of the city, San Felipe.

== History ==
On 11 March 1747 the Royal University of San Felipe was formally established. That day its main promoter, Tomás de Azúa, was elected its first rector.

However, classes did not start until 9 January 1758, 11 years later, with a course of law. As expected, it was guided by the parameters established for the oldest universities of Spanish America, such as the University of San Marcos in Lima, Del Rosario University in Bogotá, and the original University of Mexico. Through the University of San Marcos it received access to resources of the University of Salamanca, Spain.

The real organizer of the university is considered to be Valeriano de Ahumada y Ramírez de Carvajal, a learned scholar who was its vice chancellor from 1757 to 1765, and third rector from 1758 to 1759. He organized courses, controlled the attendance of students and teachers, and was a tenacious opposer of the awarding of titles to those who did not meet academic requirements (buying degrees was common at that time). Paseo Ahumada, a street in downtown Santiago, was named in honor of him and his ancestors.

The university superseded or continued the work done by the Dominicans of the Pontifical University of Saint Thomas Aquinas, and after the expulsion of the Jesuits in 1767, acquired the goods and students of the Convictorio Carolino.

Like its counterparts in Mexico and Lima, the University of San Felipe had faculties of Theology, Philosophy, Law, Medicine, and Mathematics. It graduated more than a thousand students, some of them from the Argentine provinces of Buenos Aires, Córdoba, Cuyo, and Salta. It continued in this capacity until 1813, when the university began a process of change as a result of the political independence of Chile.

The university library amassed a significant collection, noted for its “curious" manuscripts relating to indigenous peoples, donated by the Jesuits. The personal collection of Mariano Egaña was donated upon his death in 1846. In 1852, the library formed the basis of the Biblioteca Nacional de Chile.

The institution's structure diminished and ossified. This process led, in 1843, to the founding of the University of Chile, an institution which more closely adhered to cultural and educational ideals of republican society.

== Transition to the University of Chile ==
During the Patria Vieja period, the creation of the National Institute drew away many educators.

When Chile declared independence from Spain on 12 February 1817, the university removed the "Royal" from its name and began to be called simply University of San Felipe.

In 1823 it withdrew its power to award bachelor's degrees and PhDs.

Following the organization of the Republic in 1835, it began using the name University of San Felipe of the Republic of Chile Spanish: Universidad de San Felipe de la República de Chile. On 17 April 1839 the Minister of Justice, Culture, and Public Instruction, Mariano Egaña, issued a supreme decree declaring the disestablishment of the University of San Felipe, and in its place the creation of the University of Chile, transferring its goods and campus to the latter. Its last rector was Monsignor Juan Francisco Meneses Echanes.

To regulate this change from post-colonial relative autonomy to a state institution (which was opposed by the Faculty of Theology), on 26 January 1846 the government decreed the continuity of both institutions for legal purposes.

== Importance ==
In the university's classrooms, the most important figures in the Independence of Chile were educated. In addition, many foreigners who studied there played important parts in the history of Argentina and Paraguay.

Four rectors of the university were Argentines: Pedro Asensio De Tula Bazán y Soria Medrano (second rector), Gregorio Eulogio De Tapia Zegarra y Encinas, José Joaquín De Gaete y Vera Mujica, and José Gregorio De Cabrera y Romero.

José Santiago Rodríguez Zorrilla, the bishop of Santiago and a fervent supporter of the Spanish government during the War of Independence, was rector (in 1788, 1789, and 1803), as was his brother José Joaquín Rodríguez Zorrilla.

Bishop José Antonio Martínez de Aldunate y Garcés, Vice President of the Government Junta of 1810, was rector during a period of intellectual enrichment.

Miguel Eyzaguirre Arechavala, brother of Independence leader and Provisional President Agustín Eyzaguirre, was also rector.

Other Independence figures who attended the university include Bernardo de Vera y Pintado (second Argentine ambassador), Manuel Dorrego (Argentine, served subpoenas to the open cabildo of 1810), José Antonio Álvarez Jonte y Carreño (first Argentine ambassador), the priest Juan Pablo Fretes (Argentine, president of the First National Congress of 1811), Juan Martínez de Rozas (leader of the Government Junta of 1810), Hipólito de Villegas (jurist, deputy, and Minister of Finance under Bernardo O'Higgins), Juan Egaña (constitutionalist, deputy, senator), and Manuel Montt (president of the Republic from 1851 to 1861).

Many members of the open cabildo of 1810, in present-day Argentina, also pursued their studies there, including jurist and government official Miguel Mariano de Villegas.

== See also ==
- List of universities in Chile
