= Francisco Javier de Morales y Castejón de Arroyo =

Francisco Javier de Morales y Castejón de Arroyo was a Spanish soldier and interim governor of Chile from March 1770 to March 1772.

== Sources ==
- Diego Barros Arana, Vicuña Mackenna, Carlos Tomás, Historia jeneral de Chile Tomo VI, Published by R. Jover, 1886. Original from Harvard University, Digitized Sep 12, 2008, 483 pages
  - Parte Quinta Capitulo IIX pp. 316–338

Government offices
Preceded by Juan de Balmaseda y Censano Beltrán	Royal Governor of Chile; 1770–1772	Succeeded by Agustín de Jáuregui
