= Santiago Metropolitan Cathedral =

Roman Catholic Cathedral in Chile

Coordinates: 33°26′15.57″S 70°39′6.50″W

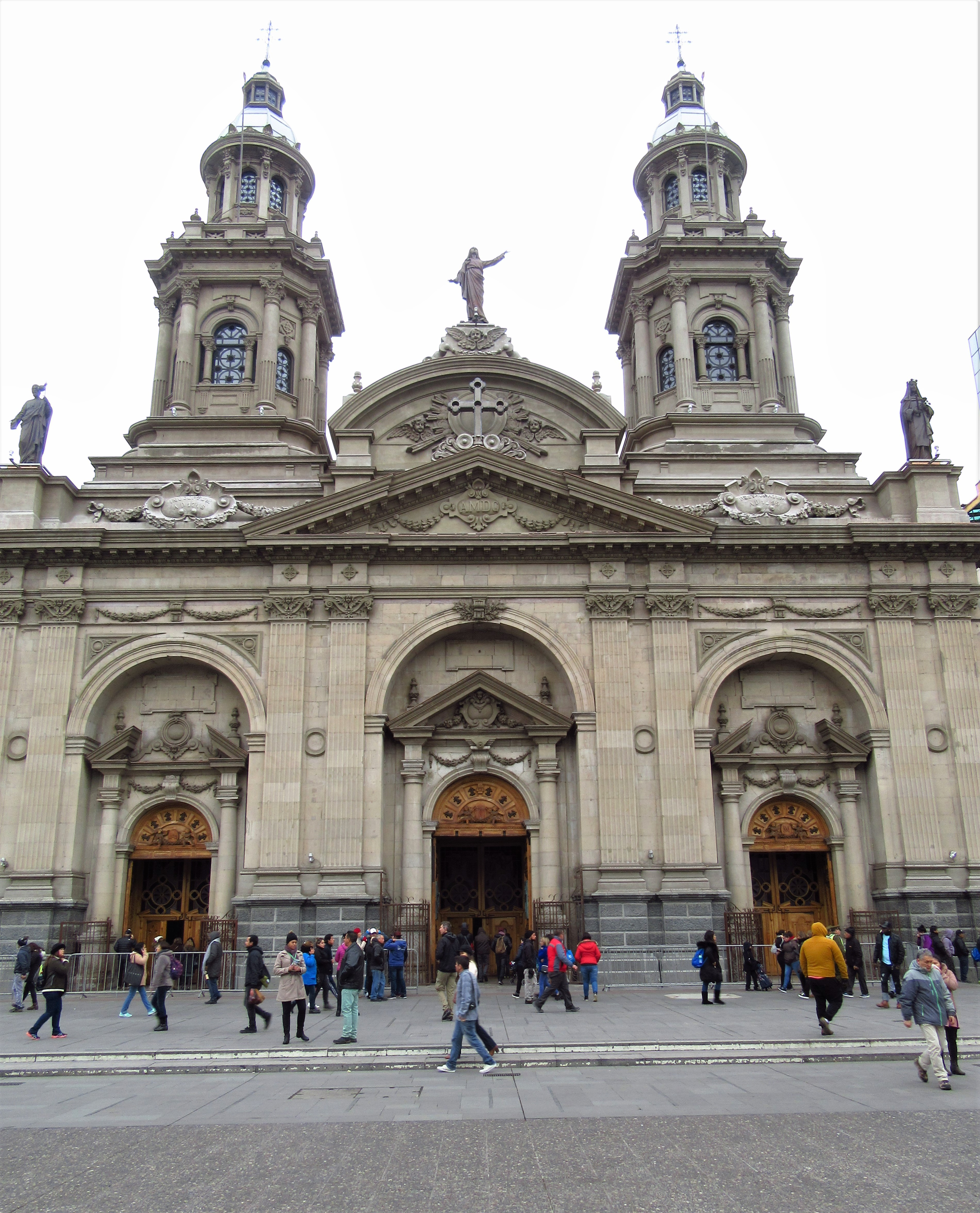
The Metropolitan Cathedral of Santiago, located in the city's Plaza de Armas.

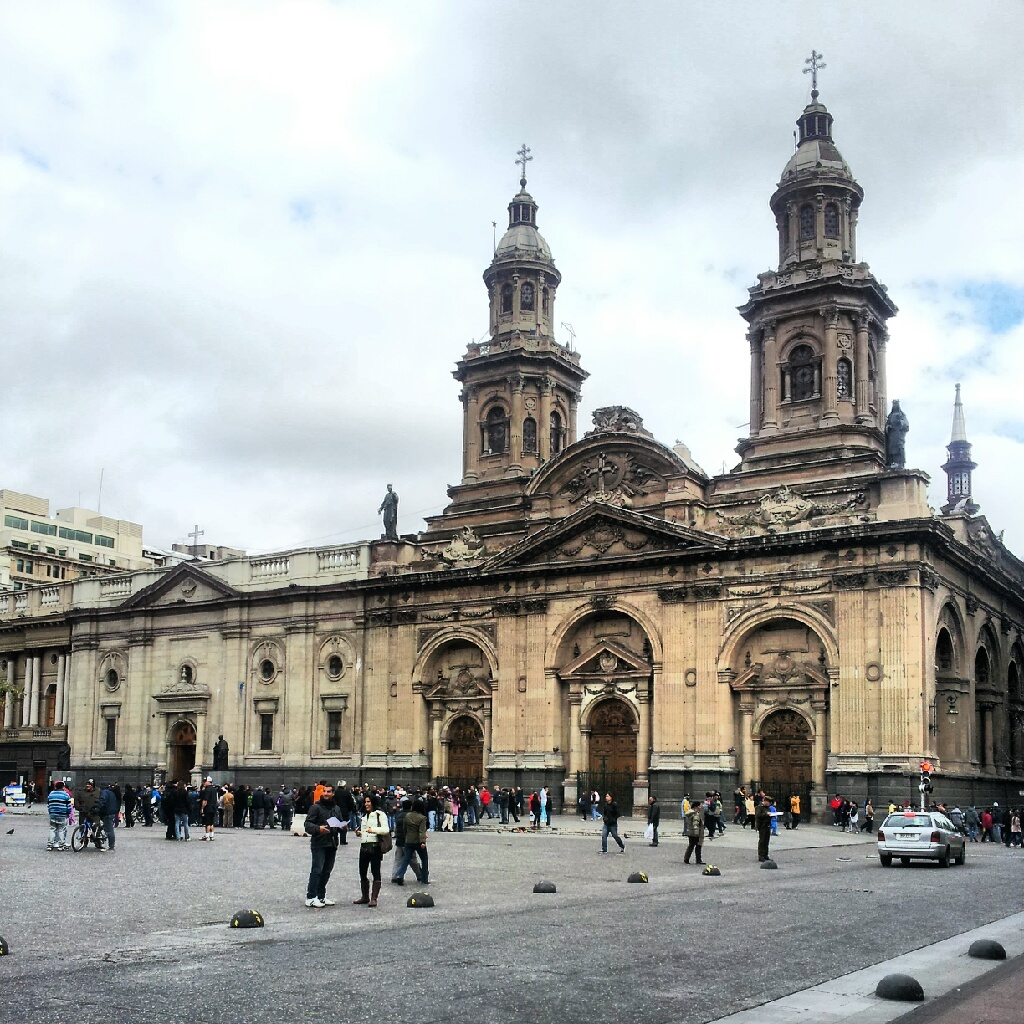
Metropolitan Cathedral

Santiago Metropolitan Cathedral (Spanish: Catedral Metropolitana de Santiago) is the seat of the Archdiocese of Santiago and the main temple of the Catholic Church in that country. As a Cathedral Church, it is the permanent seat of the Archbishop of Santiago and is dedicated to the Assumption of the Virgin Mary.

It is located in the commune of Santiago, in front of the Plaza de Armas. The architectural ensemble of the cathedral is made up of the Archbishop's Palace, the Parish del Sagrario and the cathedral itself. All these buildings are considered national monuments.

It was built between 1748 and 1906, and designed by Joaquín Toesca and Ignacio Cremonesi. Many temples preceded the one that exists today, the current one being the fifth built on the site.

== History ==
=== The earlier cathedrals ===
When refounding the city of Santiago on an Inca tambo, Pedro de Valdivia assigned the Inca temple to the northeast side of the Plaza Mayor or Plaza de Armas for the construction of a church in 1541. While it was being built, religious services such as the Eucharist were celebrated at the door of the governor's house, located where the Central Post Office is currently located. Probably, originally it must have consisted only of a chapel made of light materials, such as straw and mud; and at least since 1544, there is news that masses were no longer celebrated outdoors, so a suitable building had to be created to carry out Catholic practices.

Between 1566 and 1600 the first cathedral temple was built. With much smaller dimensions than the current ones, it was richly decorated and was arranged in a north–south direction, with its façade on Calle Catedral. However, later, its main access would be facing the square, in the so-called "Puerta del Perdón"; especially after a controversy that occurred around the year 1600, where it was argued that the north door should be closed due to the indecency of the houses that were in front of it (because they were neighbors and not part of the cult). That door was partially or totally blinded until its destruction in 1769.

On May 13, 1647, an earthquake affected the central area of the Captaincy General of Chile, destroying almost the entire city of Santiago along with the cathedral. However, the central nave of the cathedral withstood the attack, although its sagrario collapsed and its belongings could only be rescued days later. Thanks to the initiative of Bishop Gaspar de Villarroel, it was quickly retouched, although not for long. By 1657, a new telluric movement almost completely ruined its structure, and a second reconstruction had to be carried out between 1662 and 1687.

=== Bishop González's project ===
The 1730 Valparaíso earthquake once again cracked the cathedral structure, thus determining that the repairs carried out four decades earlier had been useless. To this was added the numerous accidents that had affected the structure. That is why, in 1746, Bishop Juan González Melgarejo considered that the temple should be renovated in its entirety.

The plans for this new cathedral were the work of Pedro Vogl and Juan Hagen, two members of the Society of Jesus, of Bavarian origin, who sent their project to Spain for royal approval in 1753. However, the work had already begun in 1748. After Vogl and Hagen, Matías Vásquez de Acuña and Francisco Antonio de Barros continued as directors of the works. The latter had a short time in the works, since in 1779 the Italian architect Joaquín Toesca made his appearance, to direct the construction.

Bishop González acquired the properties next to the cathedral, at the corner of the current Catedral and Bandera streets, which belonged to the Pineda Bascuñán family; and decided to place the feet (the Altar) of the new building in Bandera and the front in the square, with a length of 100 meters, changing the direction that had originally been arranged by Valdivia in the 16th century. In order not to be forced to destroy the old temple, and to be able to continue celebrating religious services, González ordered work to begin in the new section. On July 1, 1748, the first stone of the new building was laid.

González contributed 55,512 pesos with 4 1/2 reales for the work, and his successor Manuel de Alday with more than 160,000 pesos. The Crown, by 1788, had donated 97,994 pesos with 3 1/2 reales. For that year, 390,235 pesos with 5 and 1/8 reales had been spent on the cathedral, which had already been nearly two-thirds completed. After that they spent 48,964 pesos with 2 1/3 reales for the work, totaling 456,772 pesos with 8 and 3 reales in the cathedral.

=== The fire of 1769 ===
On the night of December 22, 1769, a fire broke out that destroyed the entire old cathedral, probably because the oil from the lamp that illuminated the Blessed Sacrament had spilled on some combustible object. To the clamor of the bells of the other churches, the people flocked to the scene of the incident, but it was already too late: only an image of the Virgin of Sorrows had been saved from the incident, which was located at the Puerta del Perdón. Apart from For this, according to Vásquez de Acuña, some molten silver and gold was saved thanks to the fire.

The religious service was provisionally transferred to the Church of la Compañía, which was in charge of Mercedarian religious as a result of the recent expulsion of the Jesuits from America.

However, this very circumstance was the event that accelerated the work on the cathedral. In December 1775, a part of the new temple was enabled, and the religious service was transferred there.

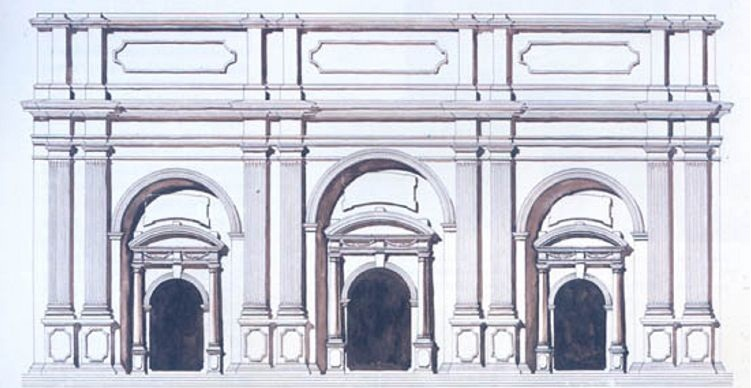
Project by Joaquín Toesca for the facade of the cathedral. Colored plate, litography of 1780.

=== The Neoclassical cathedral of Toesca and Cremonesi ===
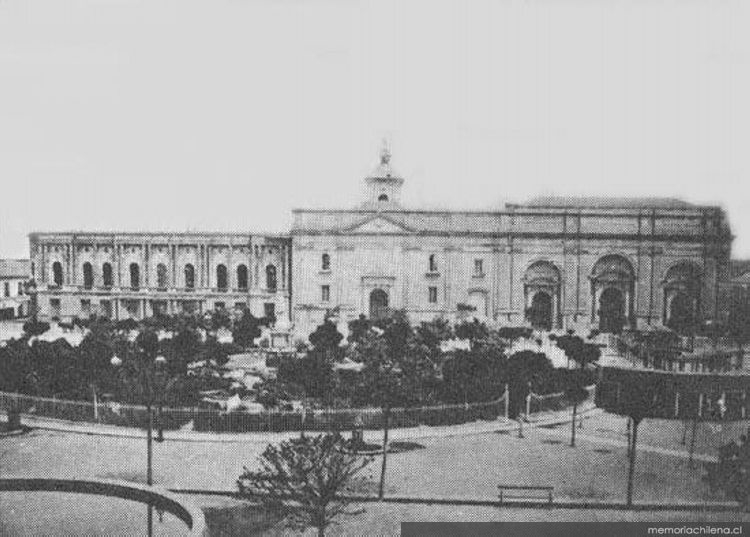
The Cathedral of Santiago and Plaza de Armas in 1870.

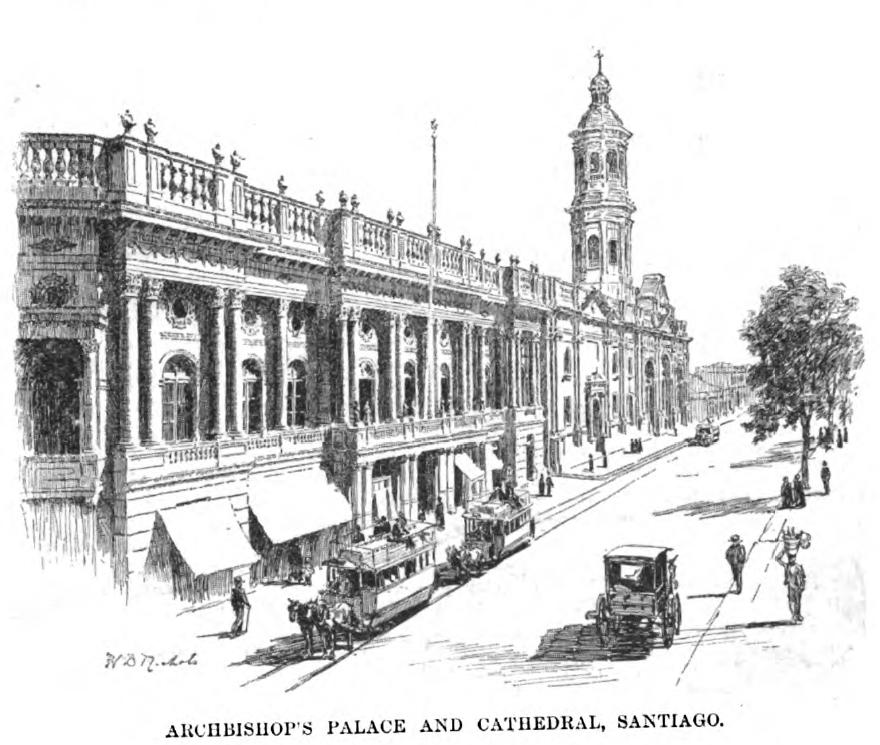
Archbishop´s palace and cathedral (with one tower), Santiago de Chile (1891), by Harper's Weekly.

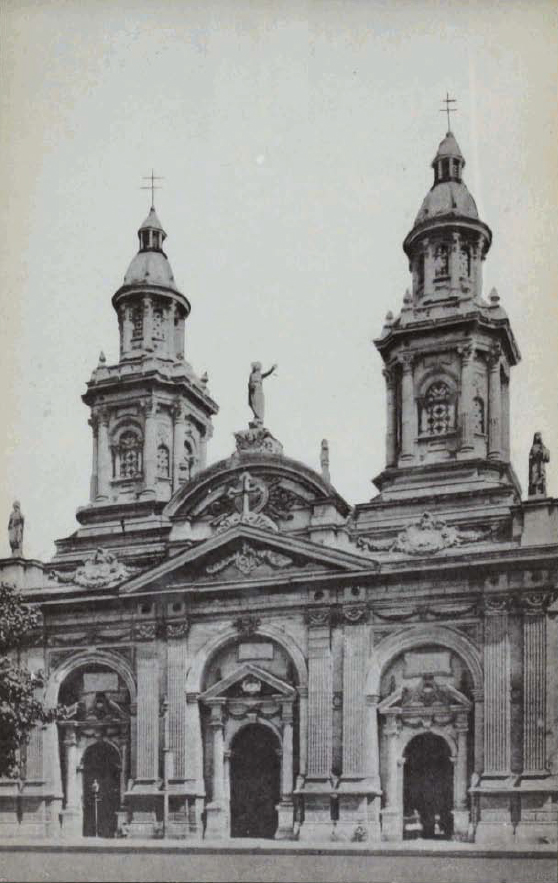
Cathedral of Santiago. Photograph from 1915, Print. Barcelona.

In 1775, Bishop Manuel de Alday presided over its consecration. Only five years later, the prelate entrusted the Italian architect Joaquín Toesca with the execution of the facades of the cathedral and the Church del Sagrario. Toesca redid the plans, beginning by directing the works in the damaged sector, next to the square, and modifying part of the area already built, with which the temple was architecturally enriched. Imposing the Neoclassical style, and remaining in the works for nearly 20 years, Toesca became the most important architect of the cathedral works.

Around 1830 the building was almost finished, and in 1840, Pope Gregory XVI turned it into a Metropolitan Cathedral, elevating the seat of Santiago to Archiepiscopal rank. The order or decree of erection was later lost, so Pope Pius IX allowed a new one to be made, leaving September 29, 1873 as the definitive date. In total, the work had taken nearly 80 years to be completed. and its cost amounted to 600,000 pesos.

In 1846 the construction of the Sagrario Chapel began, which was finished by Eusebio Chelli. A year later, Archbishop Rafael Valentín Valdivieso commissioned Alexander Caldcleugh, a friend of the former treasurer of the cathedral to buy an organ worthy of the cathedral building, while the National Congress approved the budget for it. In November 1849, the organ It arrived in Valparaíso by boat, and for its placement a choir had to be built over the main door of the cathedral, which in its first period was reinforced by fourteen English iron pillars arranged under it.

At the end of the 19th century, Archbishop Mariano Casanova ordered a series of modifications that transformed the Cathedral into the building it currently exists. Casanova had decided to completely finish the construction of the cathedral, so he hired Ignacio Cremonesi and work began in 1898. Cremonesi's design is inspired by a Tuscan or Roman style. In the transformations, the stone was covered with stucco and the wooden coffered ceiling was replaced by a sky painted with scenes in squares. The choir was first planned to be on the second level of pillars and beyond the arch. However, this meant that it was on the last ten rows of seats, so the idea was scrapped. The second option, and it was definitely left, was to leave it under the arch, which enormously increased the size of the choir but significantly restricted the sound capacity of the organ.

On May 5, 1906, Casanova was finally able to consecrate the modified temple. Inside, the church was made up of three naves: two laterals and a taller central one. Cremonesi also added two towers to the façade.

== Description ==
The main temple is made up of a plant with three naves. Its width is 45 meters and its length, from the façade to the doors facing Bandera street, is about 100 meters. This gives an area of about 4500 square meters.

=== Central nave ===
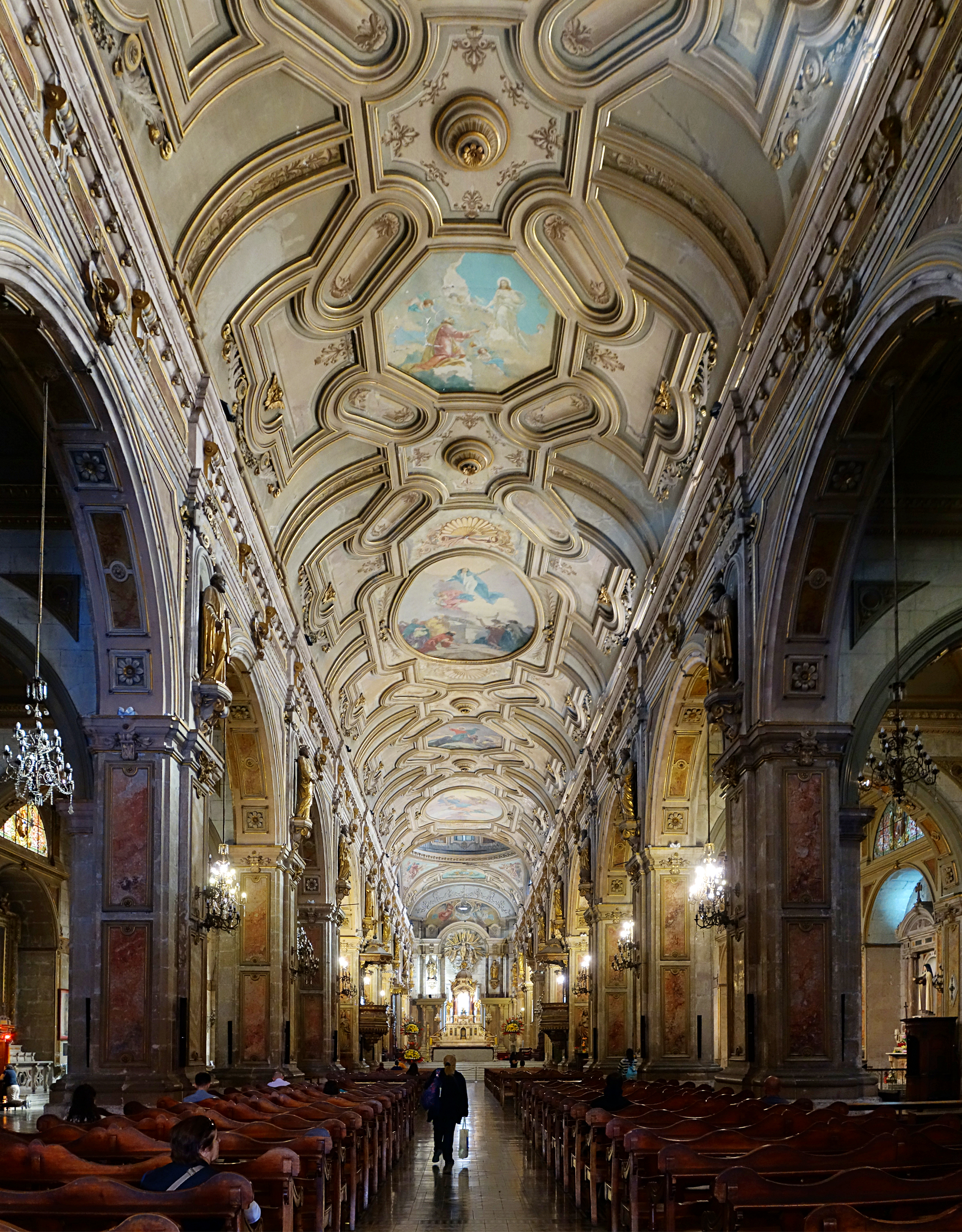
View of the central nave.

In the central nave, the old main altar stands out at its bottom, crowned by a marble ciborium that preserves the crucifix inside, crowned by an eagle and guarded by angels, which was built in Munich in 1912, where masses were celebrated until that, between the 1960s and 1970s, in the archbishopric of Cardinal Raúl Silva Henríquez, a mobile wooden altar was made to celebrate Mass facing the town, but since it was not very decent for the surroundings, a front was placed in front of it silver 3 meters long. This altar was remodeled and modified between 2005 and 2006, in a work that involved the complete renovation of the presbytery and the total renovation of the archiepiscopal crypt. The mobile altar was replaced by a fixed one, the front of the mobile altar was destined for the Chapel of the Blessed Sacrament, and structural improvements were made to the presbytery.

An ambon or wooden lectern in the shape of an eagle precedes the altar, going up the stairs of the presbytery. To its left, on the pilaster, there is a large crucifix, a donation from Pope Pius XI. Next, are the carved wooden seats, where the priests that make up the Metropolitan Council are located. In the middle of the left arm of the presbytery, under a wooden canopy, is the chair (wooden throne where the Archbishop sits during religious services). Right on the pilaster located in front of the canopy of the chair, there is a large painting that exhibits the coat of arms of the Archbishop in office.

In the center of the presbytery is the new fixed altar, made up of a smooth block of granite, guarded by a set made up of a crucifix and six silver candlesticks, as required for the Pontifical Mass. Behind the new altar is the old high altar, already mentioned. At the end of the complex, next to the old altar on the right side, is the choir organ, a pipe organ built by the German Jesuits of Calera de Tango in 1754, and is still in use. In the central nave, the carved wooden pulpits from the 19th century also stand out.

On the wall of the apse itself, there is in the upper part what we could call the main altarpiece, headed by a wooden image of the Assumption of Our Lady, patron saint of the cathedral, surrounded by angels and bronze rays, guarded by images of the Apostle Saint James the Great (patron of the city and of the archdiocese) and of Saint Rose of Lima, also in wood. Under this altarpiece, there is a window that illuminates the ciborium or manifestor where the crucifix is, and fills the central nave with light. At the feet, there is an image of Saint Francis Xavier recumbent. On its sides there are two doors that go out towards Bandera street, forming a simple rear façade.

On the other hand, in the choir that is located above the main door, there is the great pipe organ made in the Flight & Son house in London. Since the 1980s, its sound capacity is totally null.

=== Archiepiscopal crypt ===
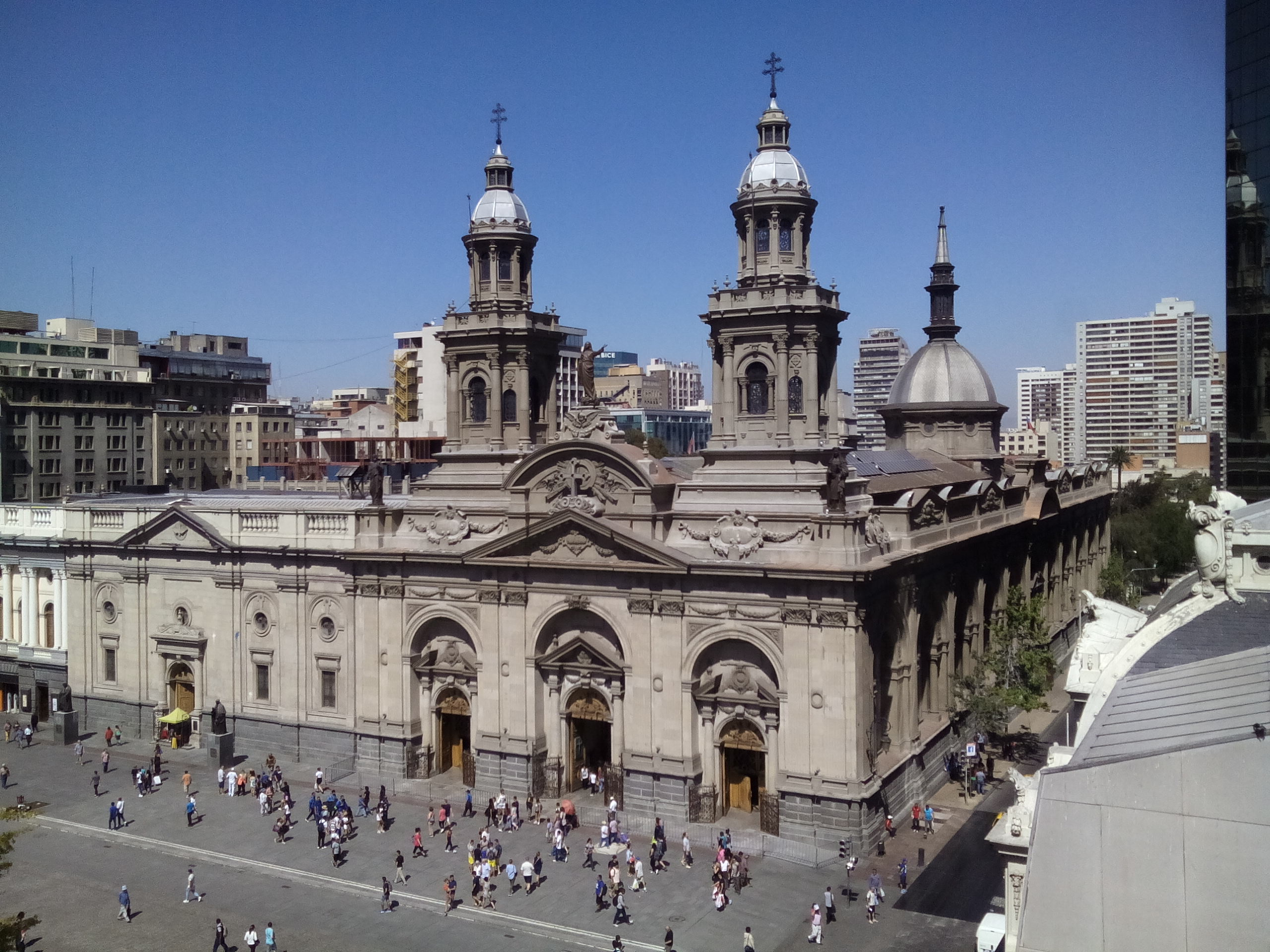
Panoramic of the cathedral

Under the slab of the presbytery is the archiepiscopal crypt, where the archbishops of Santiago are commonly buried. Formerly the crypt was a dark and battered place but, at the initiative of Cardinal Carlos Oviedo Cavada, a project was drawn up to build a new one under the main altar, more worthy of preserving the remains of the prelates. Remodeled in 2005, it currently has a modern and sober appearance, headed by a colonial Christ in a crucifixion attitude and a small granite altar. To its sides are, in the walls, the niches where some of the bishops and archbishops of Santiago rest. In addition to the diocesan bishops and archbishops, other prelates rest, such as the apostolic nuncio, Monsignor Aldo Laghi, whose only nunciature was that of Chile, being ordained a bishop on September 18 (chosen by him in homage to Chile), and dying in this country according to his wish.

Behind the old main altar, the civil crypts of Diego Portales and José Tomás Ovalle are located.

=== Right nave ===
In the right nave, the tombs of great personalities of the country's history stand out, of the first bishops and characters of the Criollo aristocracy.

Next to the right door of the Plaza de Armas is the monument and marble amphora where the hearts of the Chilean officers killed in the Battle of La Concepción in 1882 are preserved. It is neo-Gothic in style and white marble, and was inaugurated in 1912. Adjacent to the door of Calle Catedral is the carved wooden tombstone in memory of the Carrera brothers (Javiera, Juan José, José Miguel and Luis Carrera), whose tomb still remains unlocated inside the cathedral building. Also noteworthy for this nave are the tombs of Monsignor José Antonio Martínez de Aldunate, Bishop-elect of Santiago and Vice President of the First National Government Board; and that of Monsignor Joaquín Larraín Gandarillas, founder and first rector of the Pontifical Catholic University of Chile, inside a bronze sarcophagus.

In this section there are eight side altars, dedicated to:

- Saint Francis of Paola.
- Saint Francis de Sales, made of white, black and green marble.
- Saint Alberto Hurtado
- Saint Teresa of Jesus of the Andes, with relics of the saint.
- Transfiguration of Jesus, with a copy of the homonymous painting by Raphael.
- Our Lady of Mount Carmel, with a painting of the Virgin giving the scapular to the Carmelite Simon Stock (work by Jacques Pillard, made in Rome in 1864).
- Our Lord Jesus Christ, where a relics of Saint Macrinus (or Macrobio), a martyr of the primitive Church, are kept.
- Saint Peter
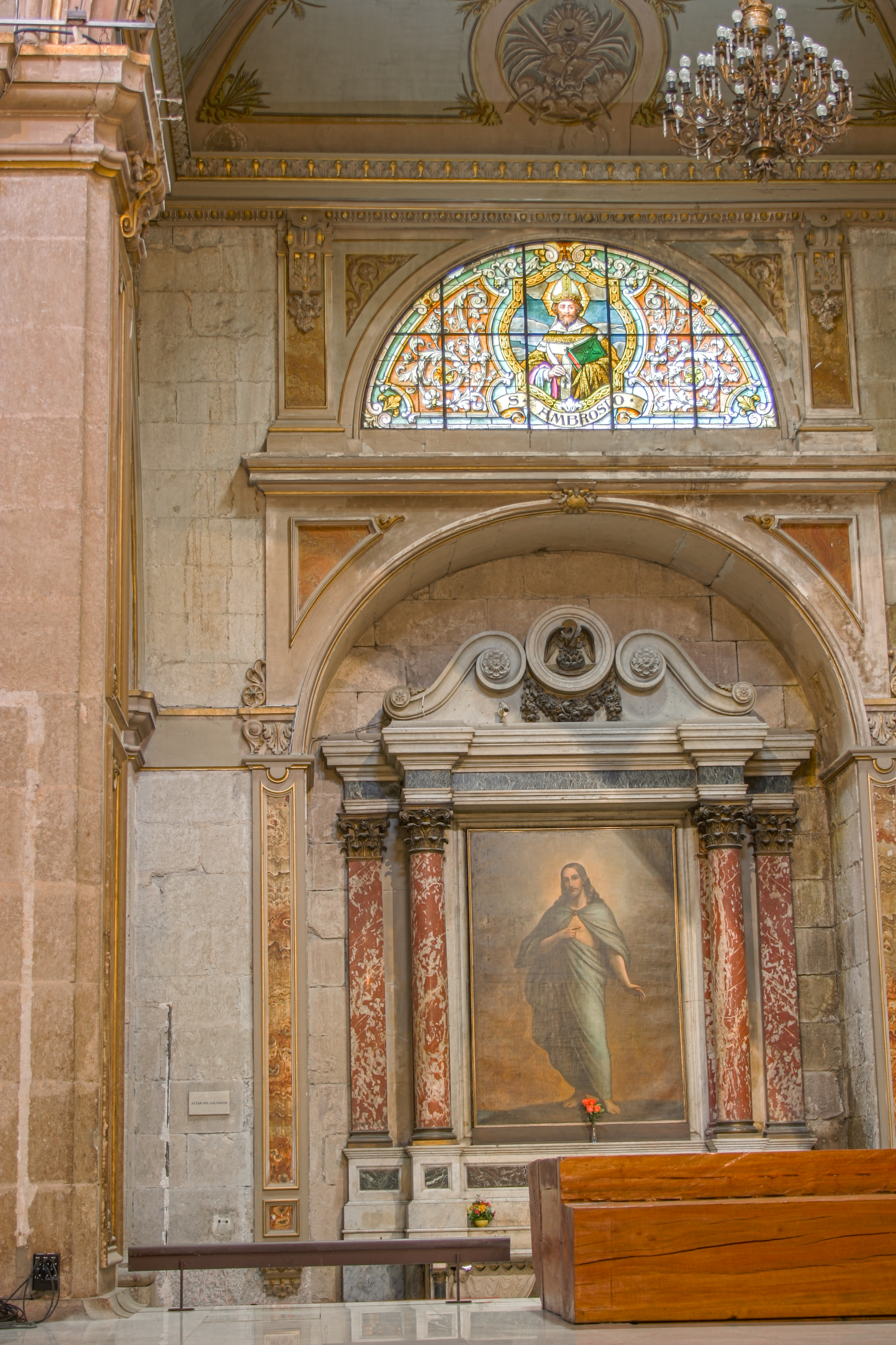
Altar of Our Lord Jesus Christ.

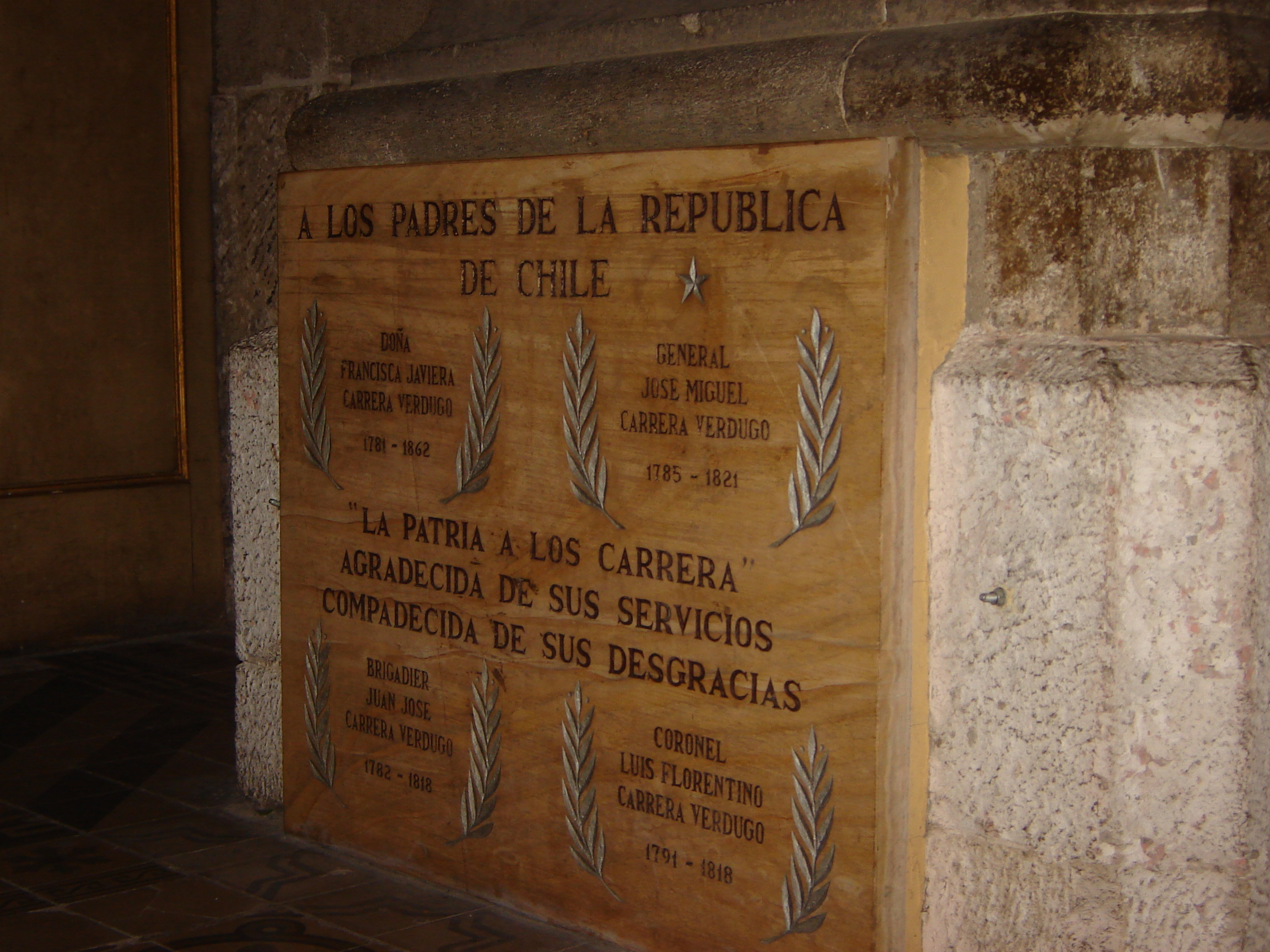
Tomb of the Carrera brothers.

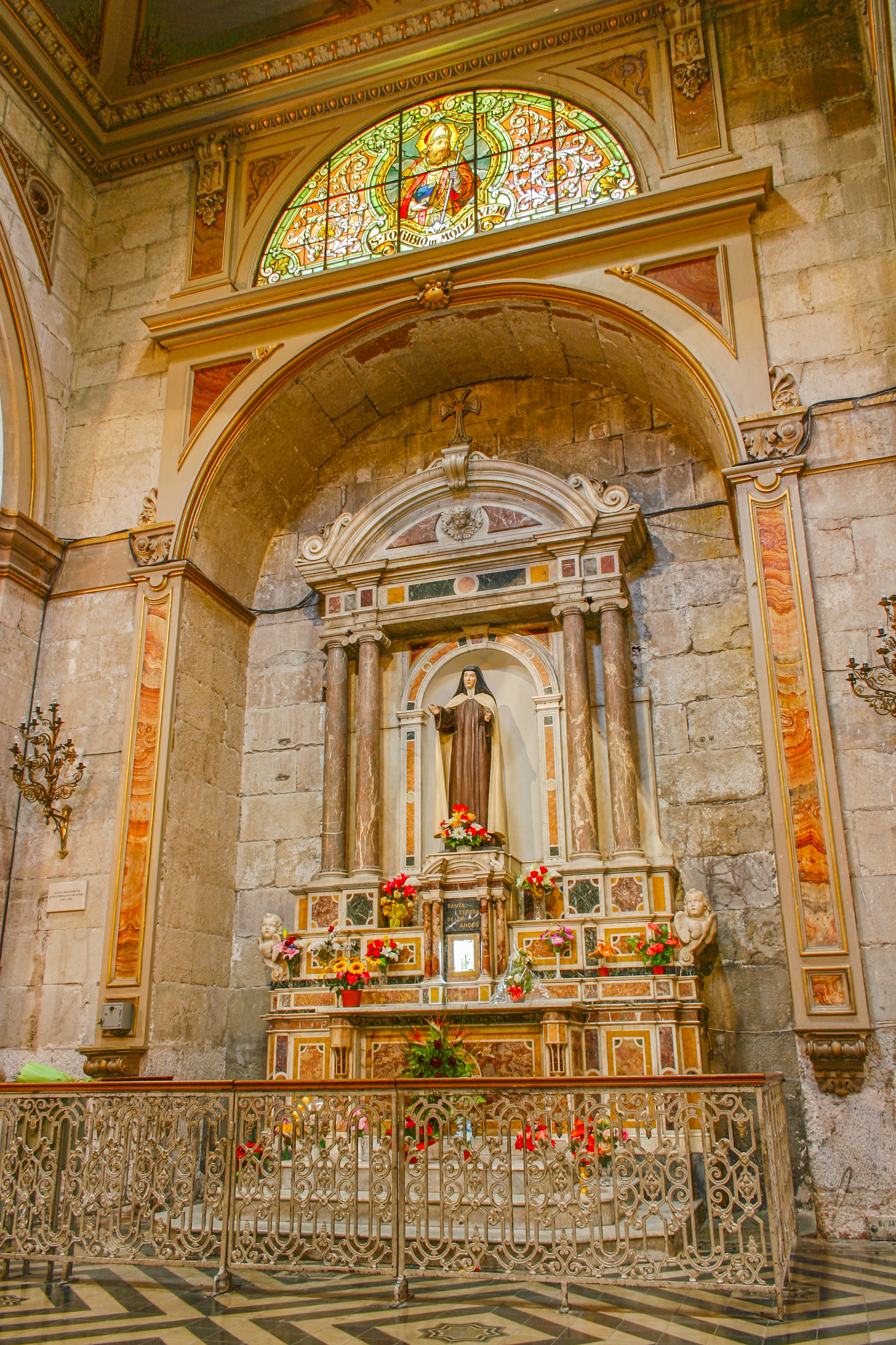
Altar of Saint Teresa of Jesus of the Andes.

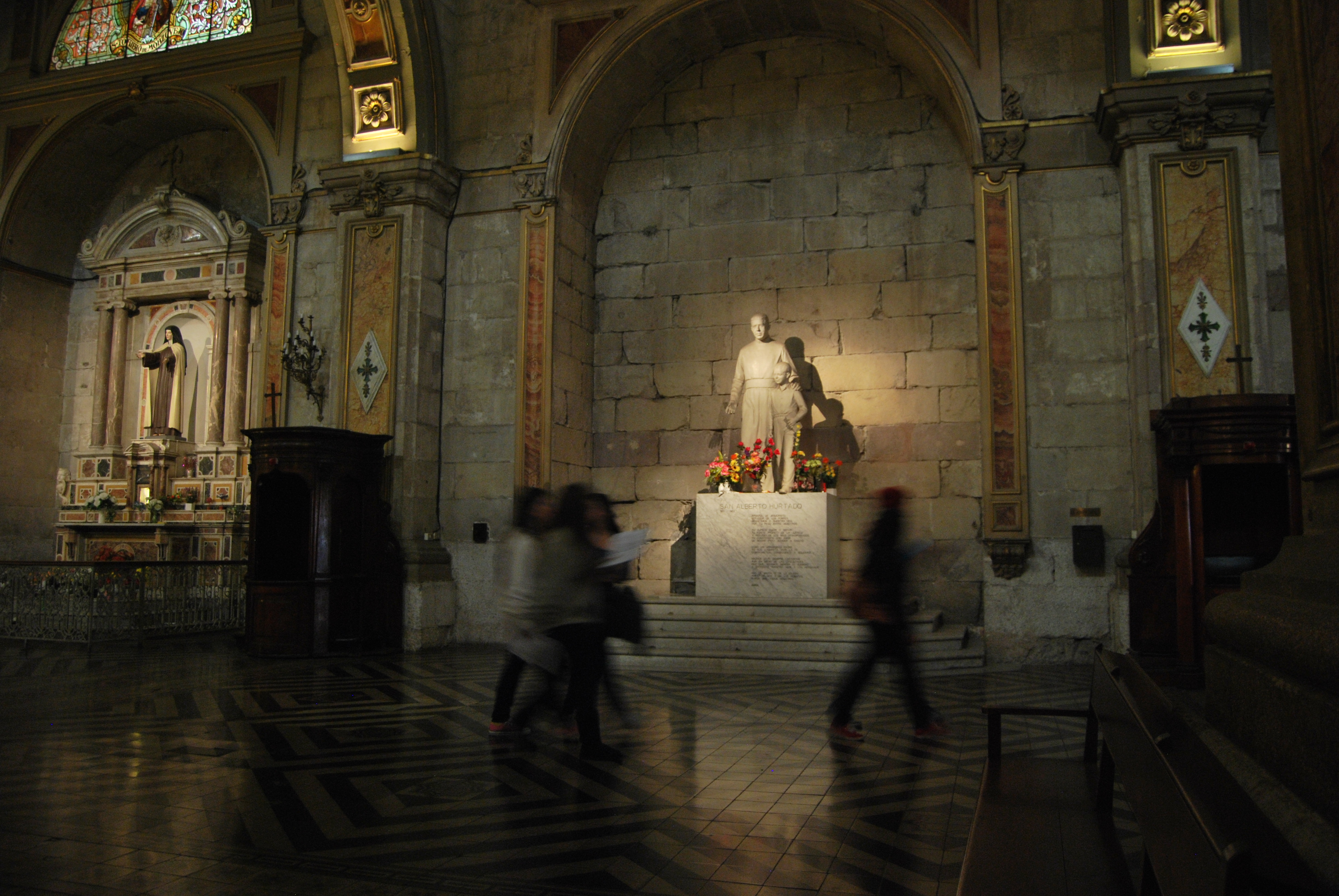
Altar of Saint Alberto Hurtado

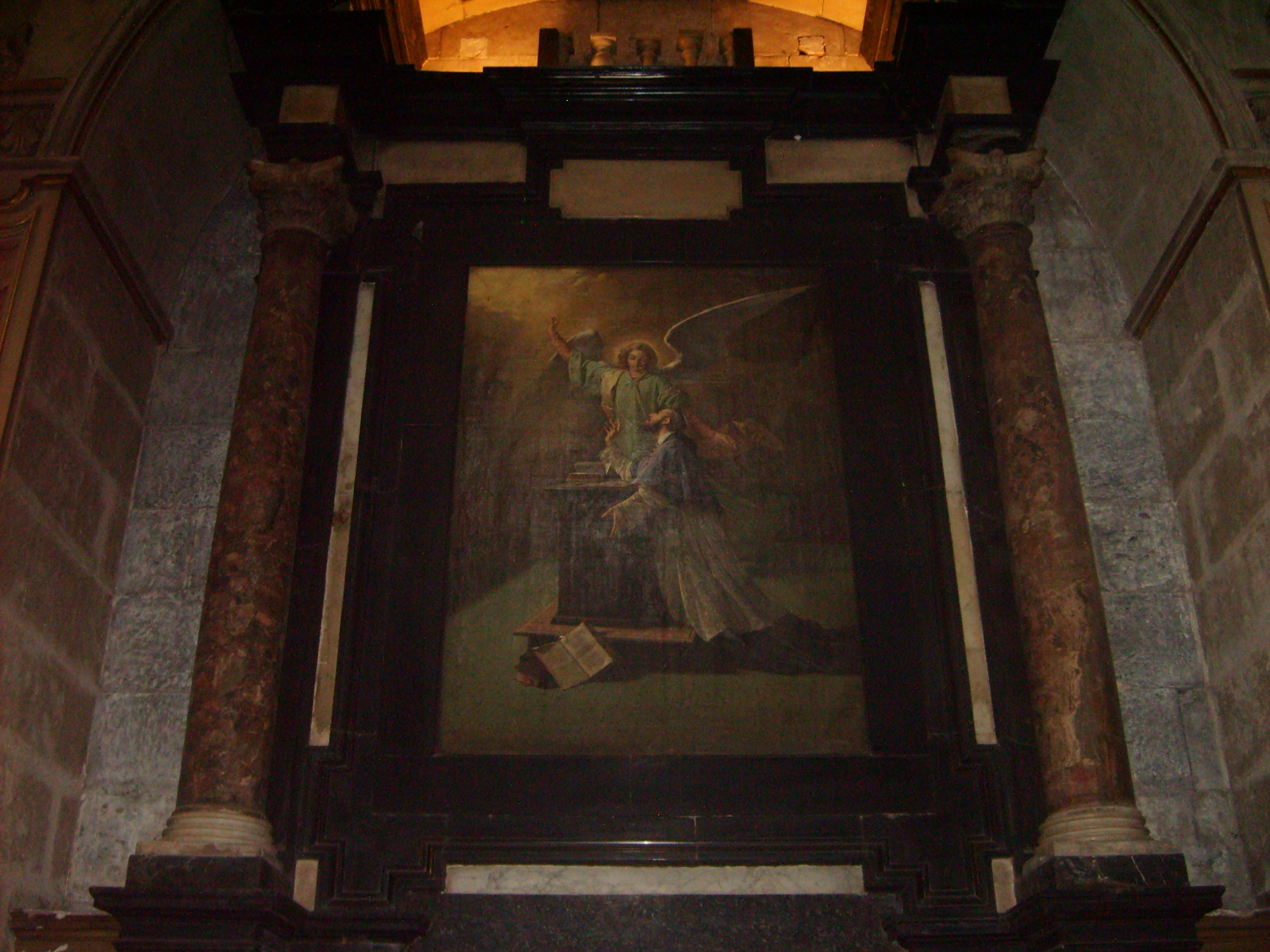
Altar of Saint Francis de Sales.

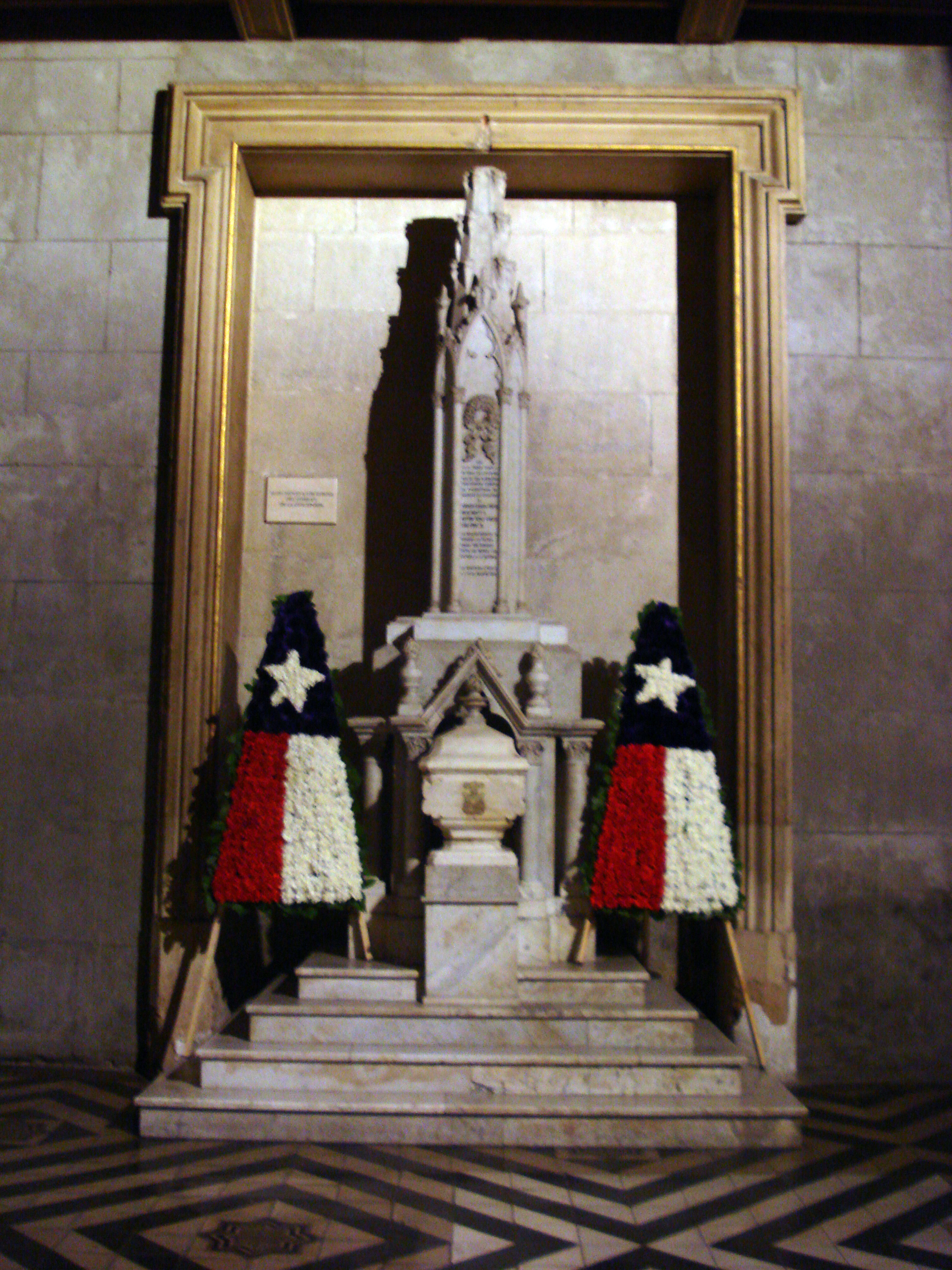
Monument to the heroes of the Battle of La Concepción.
