= Timeline of Santiago de Chile =

The following is a timeline of the history of the city of Santiago, Santiago Province, Chile.

== Prior to 19th century ==
- 1541
  - 12 February: Santiago de Nueva Extremadura founded by Spaniard Pedro de Valdivia.
  - 11 September: Settlement sacked by forces of Michimalonco.
- 1552 – Coat of arms granted.
- 1553 – Franciscan convent founded.
- 1595 – San Augustin church built.
- 1609
  - Flooding of Mapocho River.
  - es:Real Audiencia de Chile (Royal Appeals Court) reestablished in Santiago.
- 1647 – 1647 Santiago earthquake.
- 1747 – Universidad de San Felipe founded.
- 1753 – Santiago Metropolitan Cathedral building began.
- 1760 – Basilica de la Merced built.
- 1769 – Casa Colorada built.
- 1779 – es:Puente de Cal y Canto (bridge) built over Mapocho River (official inauguration 1782).
- 1783 – Flooding of Mapocho River.
- 1795 – Consulado (merchant guild) established.
- 1799 – Santiago Metropolitan Cathedral rebuilding completed.

== 19th century ==
- 1805 – La Moneda (mint) built.
- 1808 – Palacio de la Real Audiencia de Santiago built.
- 1813 – Biblioteca Nacional de Chile and Instituto Nacional (school) established.
- 1817 – City occupied by forces of Jose de San Martin.
- 1821 – Cementerio General de Santiago established in Recoleta.
- 1830 – Chilean National Museum of Natural History founded.
- 1841 – Quinta Normal Park founded.
- 1842 – University of Santiago, Chile founded.
- 1845 – Caupolican Artisans Society founded.
- 1849 – Astronomical observatory built.
- 1852 – Valparaiso-Santiago telegraph begins operating.
- 1852 – Valdivia chapel built.
- 1856 – August: Premiere of Manuel Ascencio Segura's play Ña Catita.
- 1857 – Municipal Theatre of Santiago inaugurated.
- 1863 – 8 December: Church of the Company Fire.
- 1865 – Aqueduct built.
- 1868 – Jesuit church burns down.
- 1870
  - Club Hípico de Santiago opens.
  - Cholera epidemic.
- 1872 – Benjamín Vicuña Mackenna becomes mayor.
- 1873 – Parque Cousiño inaugurated.
- 1875
  - International Exposition held.
  - Population: 148,284.
  - Plaza La Serena built (approximate date).
- 1876 – National Congress Building inaugurated.
- 1882 – Central Post Office Building (Santiago) constructed.
- 1885
  - Estación Central (railway station) opens.
  - Deutsche Wissenschaftliche Verein zu Santiago founded.
- 1888 – Pontifical Catholic University of Chile founded.
- 1893 – Santiago Stock Exchange founded.
- 1895 – Population: 256,413.
- 1897 – Estación Central (railway station) rebuilt.
- 1900
  - El Mercurio newspaper begins publication.
  - Population: 269,886.

== 20th century ==
- 1902 - Population: 322,059. (estimated)
- 1905 – Parque Forestal inaugurated.
- 1908 – December: Pan-American Scientific Congress held.
- 1911 – Chilean National History Museum founded.
- 1925 – Chilean National Zoo opens.
- 1926 – Teatro Carrera opens.
- 1927 – Santiago Metropolitan Park laid out.
- 1935
  - Teatro Oriente (theatre) built.
  - Plaza de la Constitución (Santiago de Chile) laid out (approximate date).
- 1936 – Cine Metro (cinema) opens.
- 1945 – Chilean National Ballet founded.
- 1948 – Instituto Chileno de Investigaciones Genealógicas headquartered in Santiago.
- 1950 – 3ra de la Hora newspaper begins publication.
- 1952 – Population: 664,575 city; 1,348,283 urban agglomeration.
- 1960 – Arboretum Frutillar founded.
- 1962 – 1962 FIFA World Cup held; Battle of Santiago occurs.
- 1967 – Pudahuel Airport commissioned.
- 1972
  - Centro Cultural Gabriela Mistral inaugurated.
  - United Nations Conference on Trade and Development held.
- 1973 – 11 September: Chilean coup d'état.
- 1974 – Torre Entel built.
- 1975
  - Santiago Metro begins operating.
  - Population: 3,186,000 city; 3,262,990 urban agglomeration.
- 1976 - July: Lowest temperature of -6.8 recorded in Santiago
- 1978
  - Santiago Metro Line 2 begins operating.
  - Paseo Ahumada pedestrianized.
- 1980 – Santiago Metropolitan Region established.
- 1981 – Museo Chileno de Arte Precolombino established.
- 1984 – La Cuarta newspaper begins publication.
- 1985 – 3 March: Earthquake.
- 1990
  - Metrotrén begins operating (San Fernando-Santiago).
  - Jaime Ravinet becomes mayor.
  - National Congress of Chile relocated to Valparaíso from Santiago.
- 1991 – July 21: 1991 Copa América final football tournament held.
- 1995 – Population: 4,229,970 (estimate).
- 1997 – Santiago Metro Line 5 begins operating.
- 1998 – 2nd Summit of the Americas held.

== 21st century ==
- 2002
  - Jardín Botánico Chagual (garden) established.
  - Population of Santiago (commune): 200,792; population of metro area: 5,428,590.
- 2004 – Raúl Alcaíno Lihn becomes mayor.
- 2005
  - Santiago Metro Line 4 begins operating.
  - Plaza de la Ciudadanía inaugurated (approximate date).
- 2006
  - Centro Cultural Palacio de La Moneda built.
  - Gran Torre Santiago construction begins.
- 2007 – March: Protests.
- 2008
  - Mall Plaza Alameda in business.
  - Pablo Zalaquett Said becomes mayor.
- 2010
  - 27 February: 2010 Chile earthquake.
  - 28 September: Time capsule buried in the Plaza de Armas.
  - 8 December: Fire in prison in San Miguel.
  - Taller Bloc (art space) founded.
- 2012 – Carolina Tohá becomes mayor.
- 2014 – Homeless World Cup football contest held.
- 2016
  - December: Felipe Alessandri becomes mayor.
  - Population: 5,561,252.
- 2017
  - July: Snowfall.
  - Santiago Metro Line 6 begins operating.
- 2021 – Irací Hassler becomes mayor.
- 2023 – 2023 Pan American Games are held.
- 2024 – Mario Desbordes becomes mayor.

== See also ==
- Santiago history (article section)
- History of Santiago de Chile
- Political divisions of Santiago
- List of mayors of Santiago de Chile
- Timeline of Chilean history

== Bibliography ==
=== in English ===
Published in the 18th–19th centuries

- Amédée-François Frézier (1735), "Santiago", A Voyage to the South-Sea, and Along the Coasts of Chili and Peru, in the Years 1712, 1713, and 1714, London: Christian Bowyer
- Richard Brookes (1820), "St. Jago, Chili", General Gazetteer (17th ed.), London: F.C. and J. Rivington
- David Brewster, ed. (1832). "Santiago". Edinburgh Encyclopædia. Philadelphia: Joseph Parker. hdl:2027/uc2.ark:/13960/t82j6q872.
- Josiah Conder (1830), "Santiago de Chile", The Modern Traveller, London: J.Duncan

Published in the 20th century

- "Municipal Organization in the Latin-American Capitals: Santiago de Chile". Bulletin of the International Bureau of the American Republics. 28. Washington DC: International Union of American Republics. March 1909. hdl:2027/wu.89095922225.
- "Santiago de Chile" . Encyclopædia Britannica. Vol. 24 (11th ed.). 1910. p. 191.
- Charles Warren Currier (1911), "Santiago", Lands of the Southern Cross: a visit to South America, Washington, DC: Spanish-American Publication Society
- W. H. Koebel (1913), "Santiago", Modern Chile, London: G. Bell & Sons
- United States Bureau of Foreign and Domestic Commerce (1914), "Santiago", Trade directory of South America for the promotion of American export trade, Washington DC: Government Printing Office, OCLC 5821807
- Annie Smith Peck (1916), "Santiago", The South American Tour, New York: G.H. Doran, OCLC 4541554
- Ernst B. Filsinger (1922), "Santiago", Commercial Travelers' Guide to Latin America, Washington, DC: Govt. Print. Office
- S. Samuel Trifilo (1969). "Early Nineteenth-Century British Travelers in Chile: Impressions of Santiago and Valparaíso". Journal of Inter-American Studies. 11 (3): 391–424. doi:10.2307/165420. JSTOR 165420.
- Joseph B. Fichandler and Thomas F. O'Brien, Jr. (1976). "Santiago Chile, 1541-1581: A Case Study of Urban Stagnation". The Americas. 33 (2): 205–225. doi:10.2307/980784. JSTOR 980784. S2CID 146900345.
- Trudy Ring and Robert M. Salkin, ed. (1995). "Santiago". Americas. International Dictionary of Historic Places. Routledge. p. 637+. ISBN 978-1-134-25930-4.
- Eduardo Dockemdorff; et al. (2000). "Santiago de Chile: metropolitanization, globalization and inequity". Environment and Urbanization. 12.

Published in the 21st century

- James A. Wood (2002). "The Burden of Citizenship: Artisans, Elections, and the Fuero Militar in Santiago de Chile, 1822–1851". The Americas. 58.
- David Marley (2005), "Santiago", Historic Cities of the Americas, Santa Barbara, Calif: ABC-CLIO, p. 728+, ISBN 1-57607-027-1
- Richard J. Walter (2005), Politics and Urban Growth in Santiago, Chile, 1891-1941, California: Stanford University Press, ISBN 978-0-8047-4982-4
- Fernando Perez Oyarzun (2012), Taming The River & Building The City: Infrastructure And Public Space In Santiago de Chile 1750—1810 – via International Planning History Society
- Manuel Tironi; et al. (2013). "Chile: Santiago". In Ian Shirley, Carol Neill (ed.). Asian and Pacific Cities: Development Patterns. Routledge. ISBN 978-0-415-63204-1.

=== in Spanish ===
- Francisco Solano Asta-Buruaga (1867). "Santiago". Diccionario jeográfico de la República de Chile (in Spanish). Nueva York: D. Appleton & Company. hdl:2027/hvd.hwwisq.
- Benjamín Vicuña Mackenna (1869), Historia crítica y social de la Ciudad de Santiago, desde su fundacion hasta nuestros dias (1541–1868) (in Spanish), Impr. del Mercurio v.1, v.2
- José Toribio Medina (1891). Bibliografía de la imprenta en Santiago de Chile desde sus orígenes hasta febrero de 1817 (in Spanish). Santiago de Chile – via HathiTrust.
- Luis Thayer Ojeda (1904), Santiago de Chile, origen del nombre du sus calles [Santiago de Chile, origin of the names of its streets] (in Spanish), Santiago: Guillermo E. Miranda, OL 25515663M
