= Cuartel General del Cuerpo de Bomberos de Santiago =

Chile national historic monument

Coordinates: 33.4365°S 70.6512°W

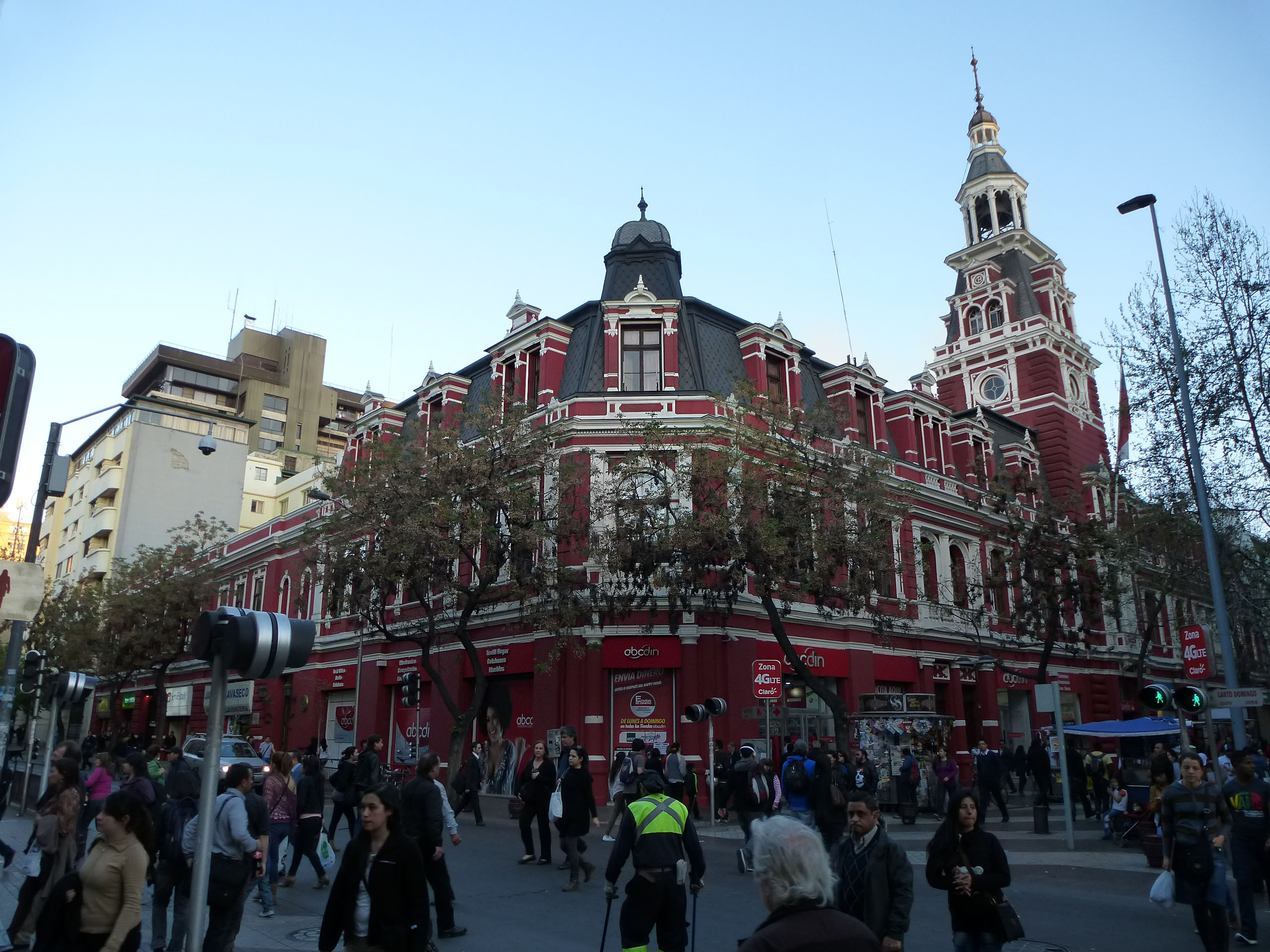
- Interactive map of Cuartel General del Cuerpo de Bomberos de Santiago

General information
- Location: Santiago, Chile

Design and construction
- Architect: Adolf Möller

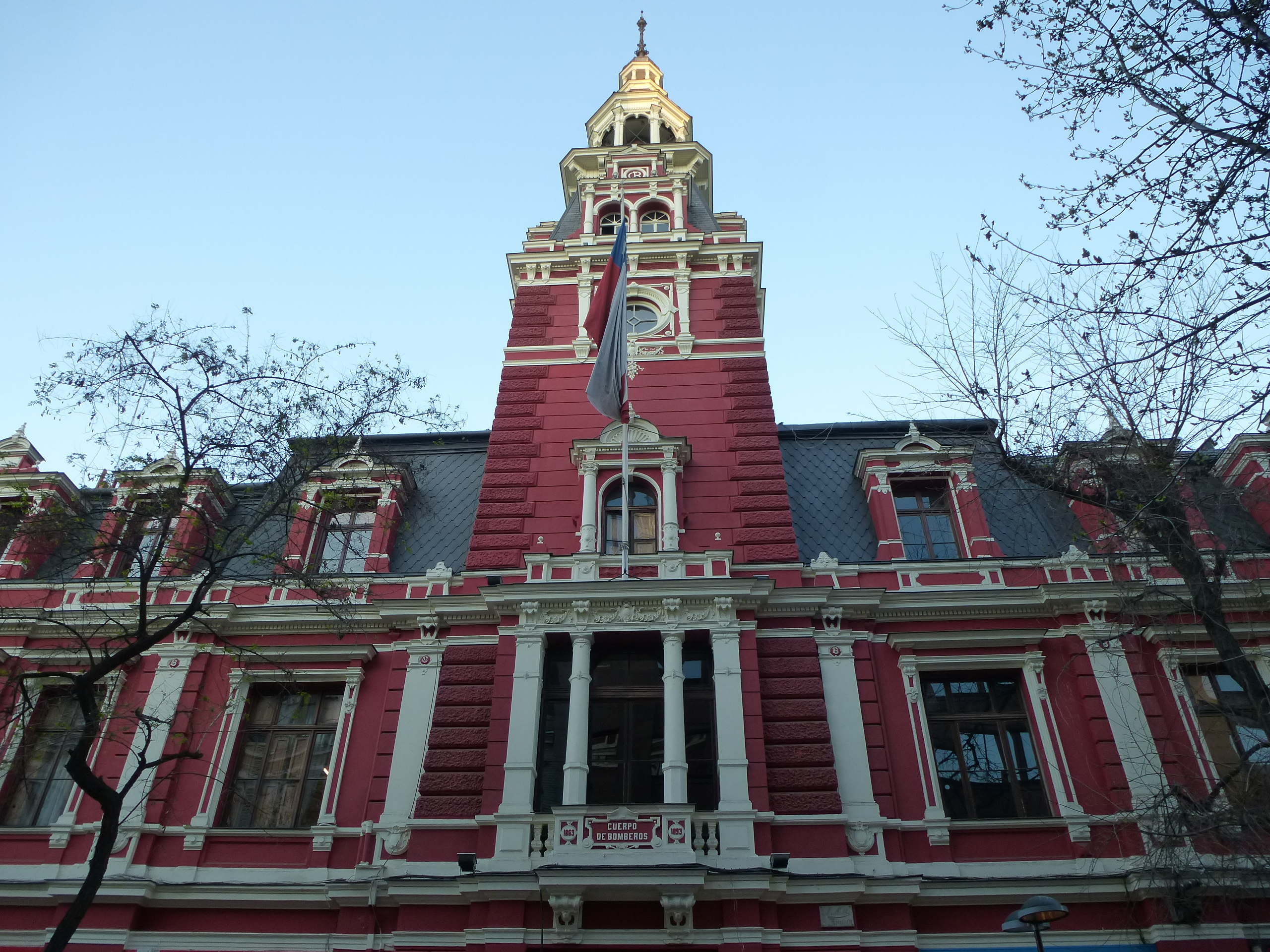
Facade

The Cuartel General del Cuerpo de Bomberos de Santiago is a building located at the corner of Santo Domingo and Paseo Puente streets, in Santiago, Chile. It was opened in 1895 and serves as headquarters for the Firefighters Corps of Santiago. It was declared as a National Historic Monument in 1983.

== History ==
The current building was built on a site whose owner was Pedro de Valdivia. He founded Santiago in 1541 and took possession of a plot of land located immediately north of the Plaza de Armas. Stables and the first prison in the city were built on that site. As a result of the 1647 Santiago earthquake, the city was partially destroyed. The rebuilding effort included the construction of a quarter on the already mentioned site to house the governor forces.

After the Chilean independence, the former building was used as a police station until 1863, when the property was transferred to the Firefighters Corps of Santiago, which was established that same year as an initiative of José Luis Claro and triggered by the Church of the Company Fire.

The old building served as the home of 5 of the 7 companies that were created. Between 1865 and 1866 it was added a tower to the building, built by Fermín Vivaceta, to housed an alarm bell —colloquially called paila— imported from United States by Henry Meiggs.

In 1893, with the demolition of the old colonial quarter began the construction of the new building on the same site. It was inaugurated in 1895 to a design of the German architect Adolf Möller. The firefighting companies of that time were housed in the building until the needs of the city caused that these were progressively scattered throughout Santiago. The last company that occupied the building was relocated in 1972, leaving the General Administration of the Firefighters Corps of Santiago as the only occupant.

The building was renovated in 1986, and in 1992 the quarters facing Santo Domingo Street were remodeled to house the vehicles of the Commandancy. The building was damaged by the 2010 Chile earthquake, after which it was repaired and its internal layout was redesigned. A fire museum was housed in the building for commemorating the 150th anniversary of the creation of the Firefighters Corps of Santiago, which will hopefully be connected to the Museo Histórico Nacional. The latter and the Central Post Office Building are located on the same city block.

== Description ==
The building, a Chilean example of Second Empire architecture, has a Renaissance Revival character. It features four stories, a 37-m-high tower that overlooks Paseo Puente street, and a turret on its chamfered corner. Since 1985 the building houses retail establishments on the street level.

The exterior walls are built in clay brick masonry, while the basement walls are of stone masonry. The internal walls are a mixture of adobe and wood framing. The building has wooden-beamed floors with a cement plaster layer, and has wood stairs in its interior.
