= Renaissance Revival architecture =

Group of 19th-century architectural revival styles

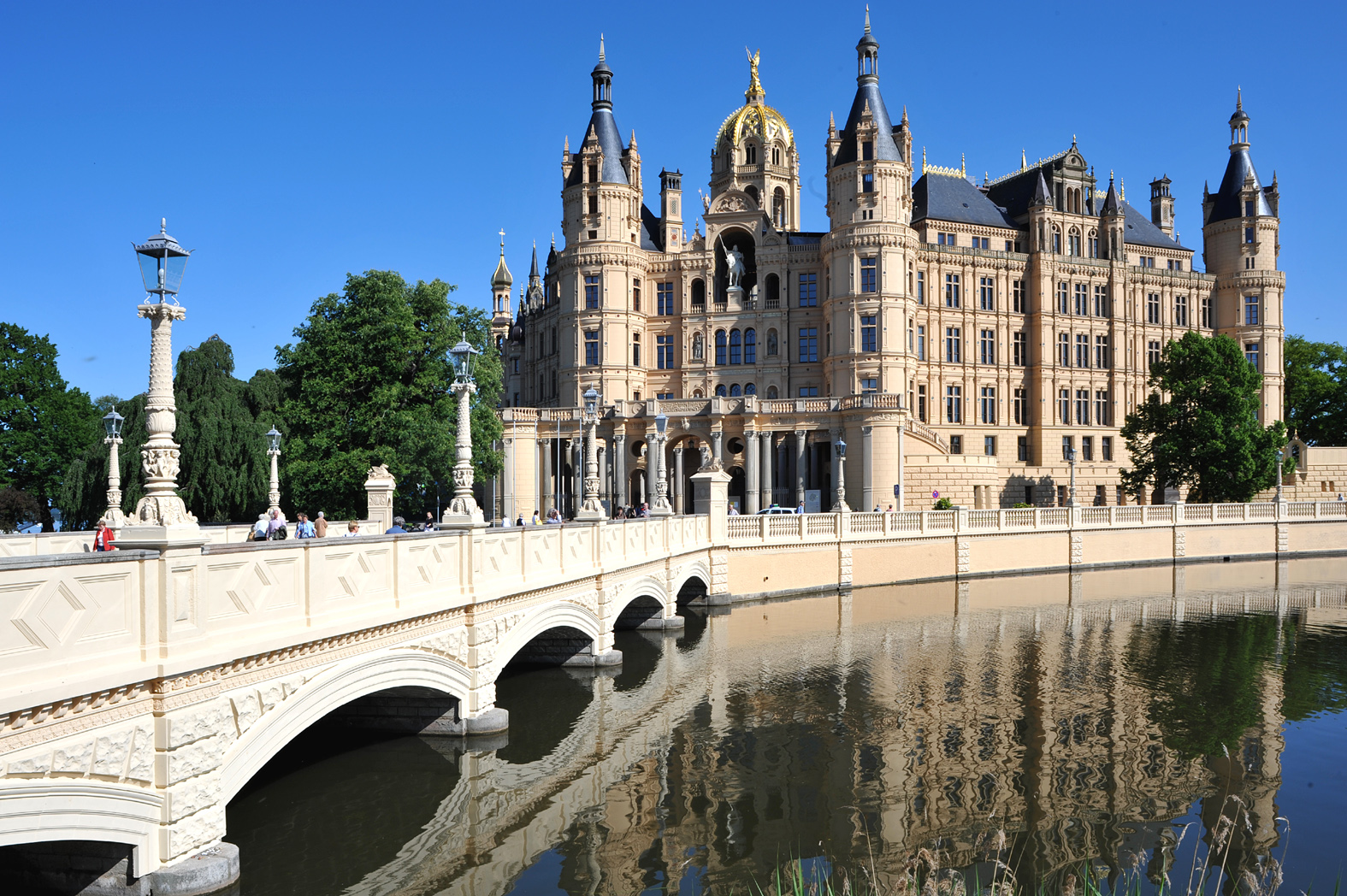
Schwerin Palace in Mecklenburg (Germany), completed in 1857

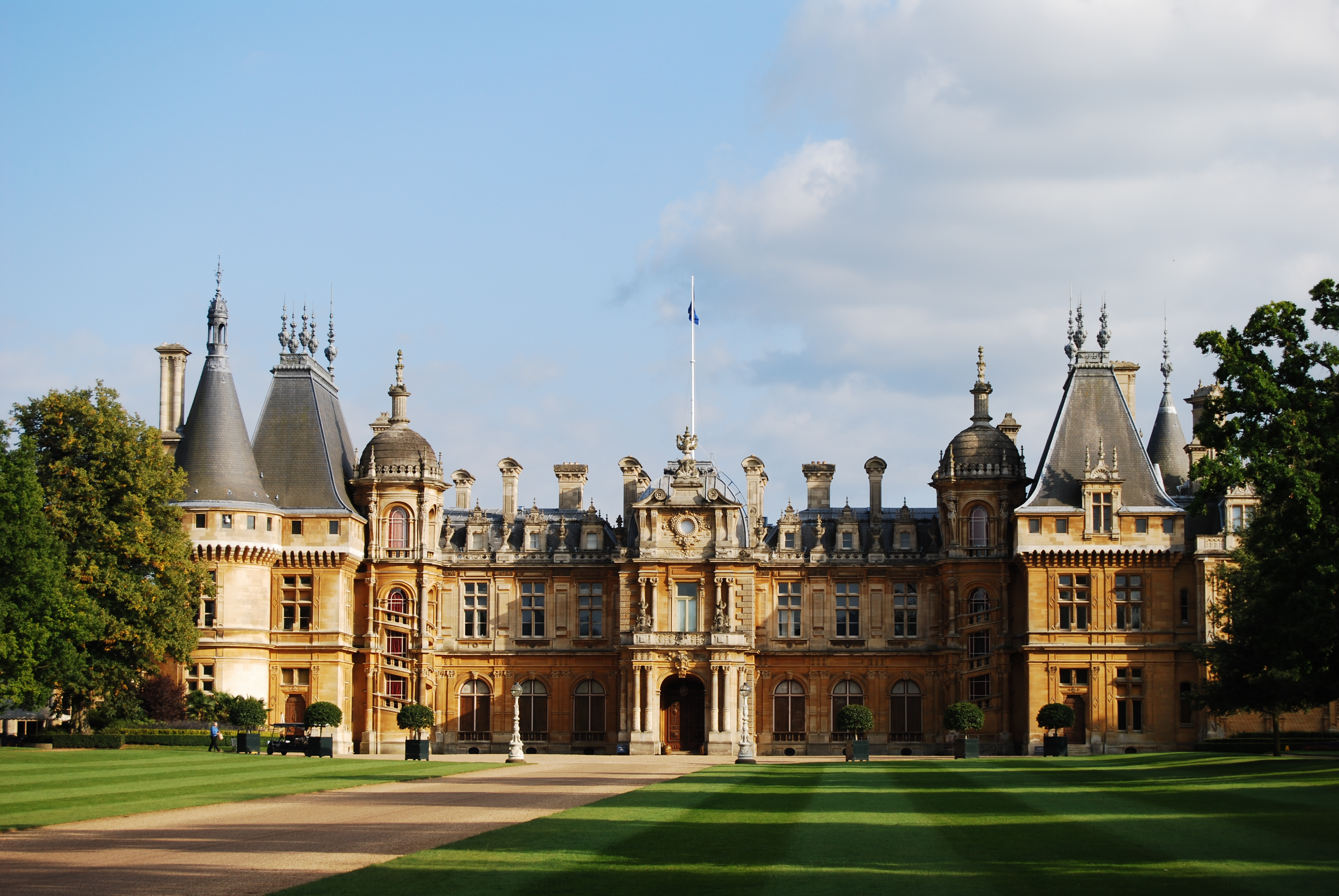
Waddesdon Manor in Buckinghamshire (England), seat of the Rothschild family, 1874

Renaissance Revival architecture (also referred to as "Neo-Renaissance") is a group of 19th-century architectural revival styles which were neither Greek Revival nor Gothic Revival but which instead drew inspiration from a wide range of Renaissance architecture modes. Under the broad designation Renaissance architecture 19th-century architects and critics went beyond the architectural style which began in Florence and Central Italy in the early 15th century as an expression of Renaissance humanism; they also included styles that can be identified as Mannerist. Self-applied style designations were rife in the mid- and later 19th century: "Neo-Renaissance" might be applied by contemporaries to structures that others called "Italianate", or when many French Baroque features are present (Second Empire).

The divergent forms of Renaissance architecture in different parts of Europe, particularly in France and Italy, has added to the difficulty of defining and recognizing Neo-Renaissance architecture. A comparison between the breadth of its source material, such as the English Wollaton Hall, Italian Palazzo Pitti, the French Château de Chambord, and the Russian Palace of Facets—all deemed "Renaissance"—illustrates the variety of appearances the same architectural label can take.

== Origins of Renaissance architecture ==
The origin of Renaissance architecture is generally accredited to Filippo Brunelleschi (1377–1446). Brunelleschi and his contemporaries wished to bring greater "order" to architecture, resulting in strong symmetry and careful proportion. The movement grew from scientific observations of nature, in particular, human anatomy.

Neo-Renaissance architecture is formed by not only the original Italian architecture but by the form in which Renaissance architecture developed in France during the 16th century. During the early years of the 16th century, the French were involved in the Italian Wars, bringing back to France not just the Renaissance art treasures as their war booty, but also stylistic ideas. In the Loire valley a wave of chateau building was carried out using traditional French Gothic styles but with ornament in the forms of pediments, arcades, shallow pilasters and entablatures from the Italian Renaissance.

In England, the Renaissance tended to manifest itself in large square tall houses such as Longleat House (1568–1580). Often these buildings had symmetrical towers which hint at the evolution from medieval fortified architecture. This is particularly evident at Hatfield House (1607–1612), where medieval towers jostle with a large Italian cupola. This is why so many buildings of the early English Neo-Renaissance style often have more of a "castle air" than their continental European contemporaries, which can add again to the confusion with the Gothic Revival style.

== Birth of the Neo-Renaissance ==
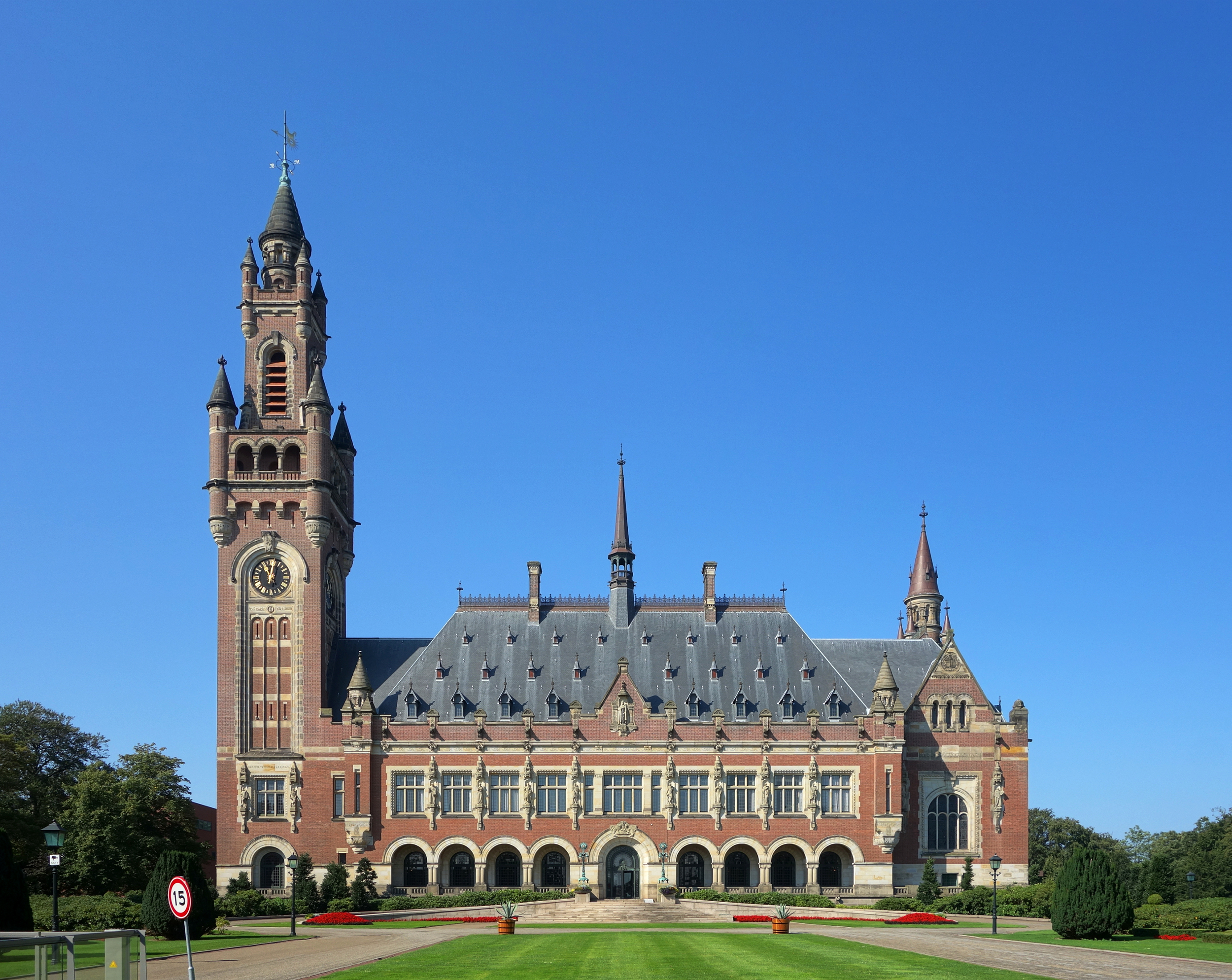
Peace Palace in The Hague, Netherlands, 1913. One of the last notable buildings in this style.

When the revival of Renaissance style architecture came en vogue in the mid 19th century, it often materialized not just in its original form first seen in Italy, but as a hybrid of all its forms according to the whims of architects and patrons, an approach typical of the mid and late 19th century. Modern scholarship defines the styles following the Renaissance as Mannerist and Baroque, two very different, even opposing styles of architecture, but the architects of the mid 19th century understood them as part of a continuum, often simply called 'Italian', and freely combined them all, as well as Renaissance as it was first practiced in other countries.

Thus Italian, French and Flemish Renaissance coupled with the amount of borrowing from these later periods can cause great difficulty and argument in correctly identifying various forms of 19th-century architecture. Differentiating some forms of French Neo-Renaissance buildings from those of the Gothic revival can at times be especially tricky, as both styles were simultaneously popular during the 19th century.

As a consequence, a self-consciously "Neo-Renaissance" manner first began to appear c. 1840. By 1890 this movement was already in decline. The Hague's Peace Palace completed in 1913, in a heavy French Neo-Renaissance manner was one of the last notable buildings in this style.

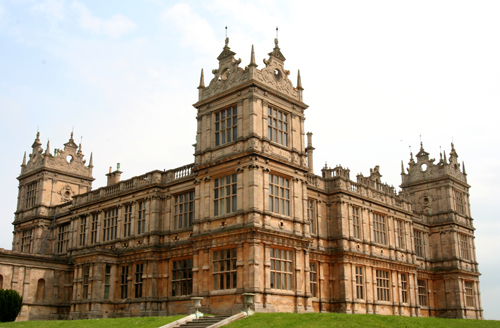
Mentmore Towers in Buckinghamshire. English Jacobethan Neo-Renaissance completed in 1854, derives motifs from Wollaton Hall completed in 1588.

Charles Barry introduced the Neo-Renaissance to England with his design of the Travellers Club, Pall Mall (1829–1832). Other early but typical, domestic examples of the Neo-Renaissance include Mentmore Towers and the Château de Ferrières, both designed in the 1850s by Joseph Paxton for members of the Rothschild banking family. The style is characterized by original Renaissance motifs, taken from such Quattrocento architects as Alberti. These motifs included rusticated masonry and quoins, windows framed by architraves and doors crowned by pediments and entablatures. If a building were of several floors, the uppermost floor usually had small square windows representing the minor mezzanine floor of the original Renaissance designs. However, the Neo-renaissance style later came to incorporate Romanesque and Baroque features not found in the original Renaissance architecture which was often more severe in its design. John Ruskin's panegyrics to architectural wonders of Venice and Florence in the 1850s contributed to shifting "the attention of scholars and designers, with their awareness heightened by debate and restoration work" from Late Neoclassicism and Gothic Revival to the Italian Renaissance.

Like all architectural styles, the Neo-Renaissance did not appear overnight fully formed but evolved slowly. One of the first signs of its emergence was the Würzburg Women's Prison, which was erected in 1809 designed by Peter Speeth. It included a heavily rusticated ground floor, alleviated by one semicircular arch, with a curious Egyptian style miniature portico above, high above this were a sequence of six tall arched windows and above these just beneath the slightly projecting roof were the small windows of the upper floor. This building foreshadows similar effects in the work of the American architect Henry Hobson Richardson whose work in the Neo-Renaissance style was popular in the US during the 1880s. Richardson's style at the end or the revival era was a severe mix of both Romanesque and Renaissance features. This was exemplified by his "Marshall Field Warehouse" in Chicago (completed in 1887, now demolished). Neo-Renaissance was adopted early in Munich, often based directly on Italian Palazzi, first appearing in the Palais Leuchtenberg (1817–21), by Leo von Klenze, then adopted as a state style under the reign of Ludwig I of Bavaria for such landmarks as the Alte Pinakothek (1826–36), the Konigbau wing of the Munich Residenz (1825–35), and the Bavarian State Library (1831–43).

== Development and expansion ==
=== Europe ===
While the beginning of Neo-Renaissance period can be defined by its simplicity and severity, what came later was far more ornate in its design. This period can be defined by some of the great opera houses of Europe, such as Gottfried Semper's Burgtheater in Vienna, and his Opera house in Dresden. This ornate form of the Neo-Renaissance, originating from France, is sometimes known as the "Second Empire" style, by now it also incorporated some Baroque elements. By 1875 it had become the accepted style in Europe for all public and bureaucratic buildings. In England, where Sir George Gilbert Scott designed the London Foreign Office in this style between 1860 and 1875, it also incorporated certain Palladian features.

Starting with the orangery of Sanssouci (1851), "the Neo-Renaissance became the obligatory style for university and public buildings, for banks and financial institutions, and for the urban villas" in Germany. Among the most accomplished examples of the style were Villa Meyer in Dresden, Villa Haas in Hesse, Palais Borsig in Berlin, Villa Meissner in Leipzig; the German version of Neo-Renaissance culminated in such projects as the Town Hall in Hamburg (1886–1897), the Reichstag in Berlin (completed in 1894) and the Reich Court building in Leipzig (completed in 1895).

In Austria, it was pioneered by such illustrious names as Rudolf Eitelberger, the founder of the Viennese College of Arts and Crafts (today the University of Applied Arts Vienna). The style found particular favour in Vienna, where whole streets and blocks were built in the so-called Neo-Renaissance style, in reality, a classicizing conglomeration of elements liberally borrowed from different historical periods.

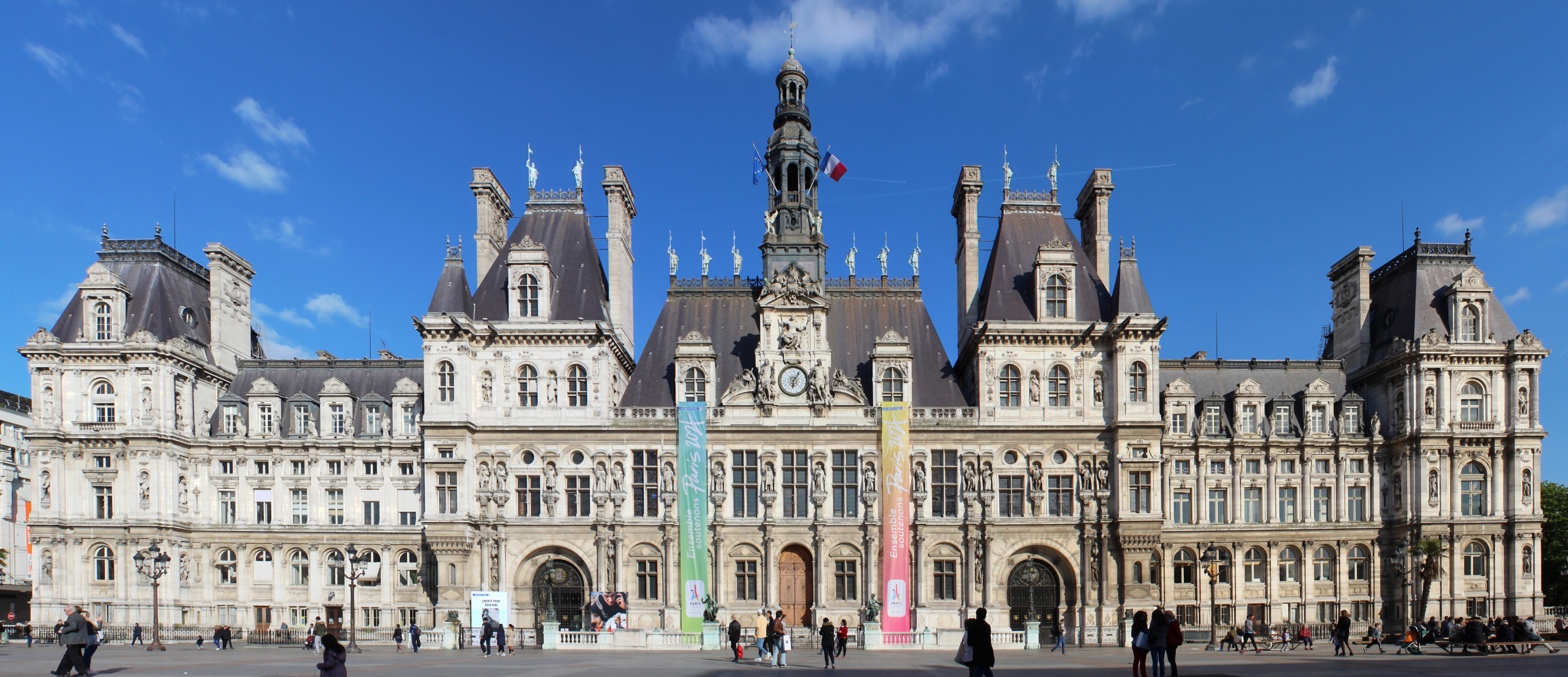
Paris' Hôtel de Ville, completed c. 1880 in an unequivocal French Neo-Renaissance style

Neo-Renaissance was also the favourite style in Kingdom of Hungary in the 1870s and 1880s. In the fast-growing capital, Budapest many monumental public buildings were built in Neo-Renaissance style like Saint Stephen's Basilica and the Hungarian State Opera House. Andrássy Avenue is an outstanding ensemble of Neo-Renaissance townhouses from the last decades of the 19th century. The most famous Hungarian architect of the age, Miklós Ybl preferred Neo-Renaissance in his works.

In Russia, the style was pioneered by Auguste de Montferrand in the Demidov House (1835), the first in Saint Petersburg to take "a story-by-story approach to façade ornamentation, in contrast to the classical method, where the façade was conceived as a unit." Konstantin Thon, the most popular Russian architect of the time, used Italianate elements profusely for decorating some interiors of the Grand Kremlin Palace (1837–1851). Another fashionable architect, Andrei Stackenschneider, was responsible for Mariinsky Palace (1839–1844), with "the faceted rough-hewn stone of the first floor" reminiscent of 16th-century Italian palazzi.

The style was further elaborated by architects of the Vladimir Palace (1867–1872) and culminated in the Stieglitz Museum (1885–1896). In Moscow, the Neo-Renaissance was less prevalent than in the Northern capital, although interiors of the neo-Muscovite City Duma (1890–1892) were executed with emphasis on Florentine and Venetian décor. While the Neo-Renaissance is associated primarily with secular buildings, Princes Yusupov commissioned the interior of their palace church (1909–1916) near Moscow to be decorated in strict imitation of the 16th-century Venetian churches.

=== North America ===
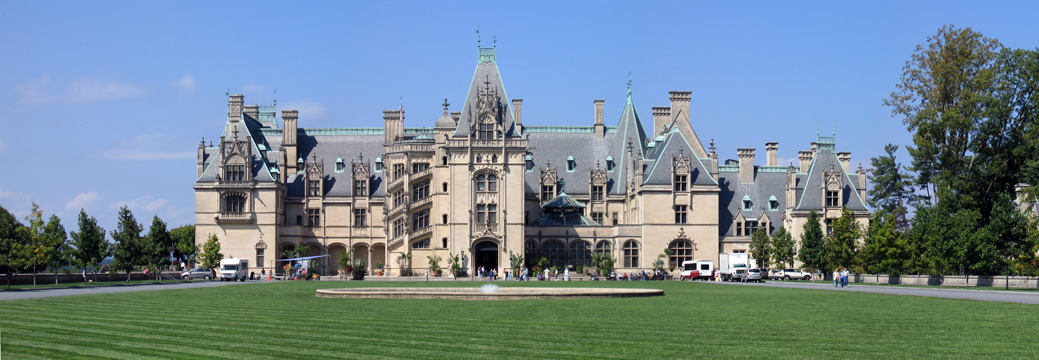
Biltmore House in Asheville, North Carolina (United States), owned by the Vanderbilt family, 1888–1895

The style spread to North America, where it became a favourite domestic architectural style of the wealthiest Americans. The Breakers in Newport, Rhode Island, was a residence of the Vanderbilt family designed by Richard Morris Hunt in 1892; it and contemporaneous Gilded Age mansions exemplify the ambitions of wealthy Americans in equaling and surpassing the ostentatious lifestyles of European aristocrats.

During the latter half of the 19th century 5th Avenue in New York City was lined with "Renaissance" French chateaux and Italian palazzi, all designed in Neo-Renaissance styles. Most of these have since been demolished.

=== South America ===
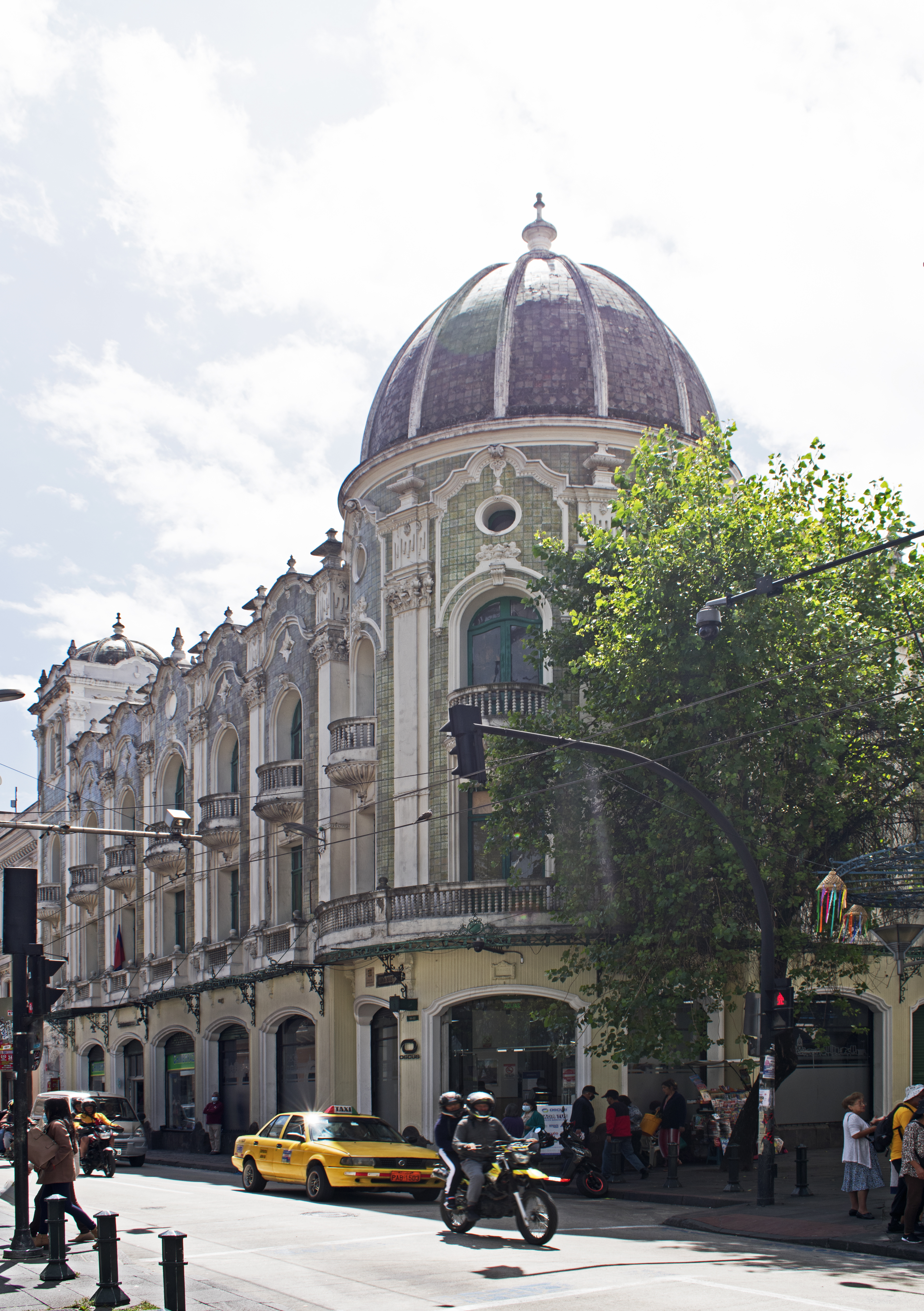
Palacio Chiriboga in Quito (Ecuador), which combines Renaissance architecture with Neoclassical, Arab, and Art Nouveau elements.

Neo-Renaissance architecture first arrived to South America in the mid-nineteenth century, as can be seen in buildings like the Archbishop’s Palace in Santiago, Chile. It was not until the late nineteenth and early twentieth centuries, though, that the style became popular in the region. Argentina and Chile have some of the best examples of the style, including the City hall in La Plata, and the Firefighter Corps headquarters and Palacio Bruna in Santiago.

== Features ==
=== Façade lay-out ===
Following the original, Renaissance Revival façades contain horizontal lines, for much of its length and often completely end-to-end. In a similar way both original and revival façades are finished with cornice.

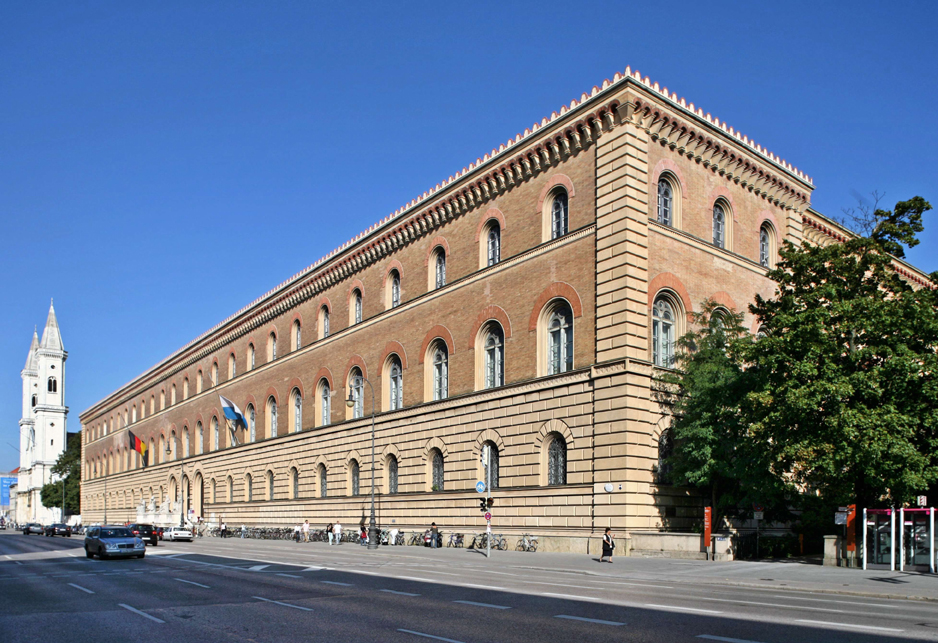
Bavarian State Library, 1843

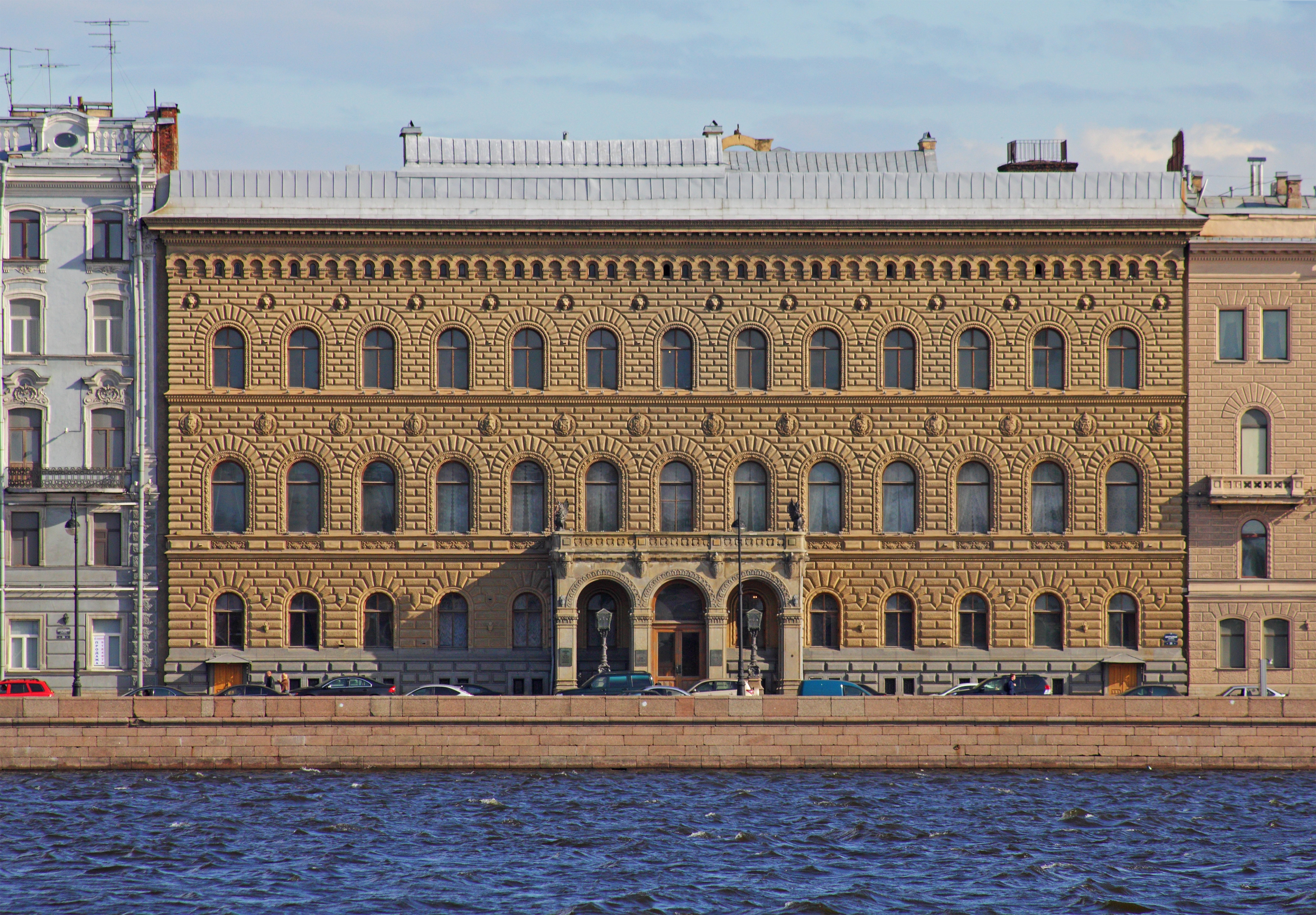
Vladimir Palace in Saint Petersburg, redolent of Alberti's designs, 1867–1872

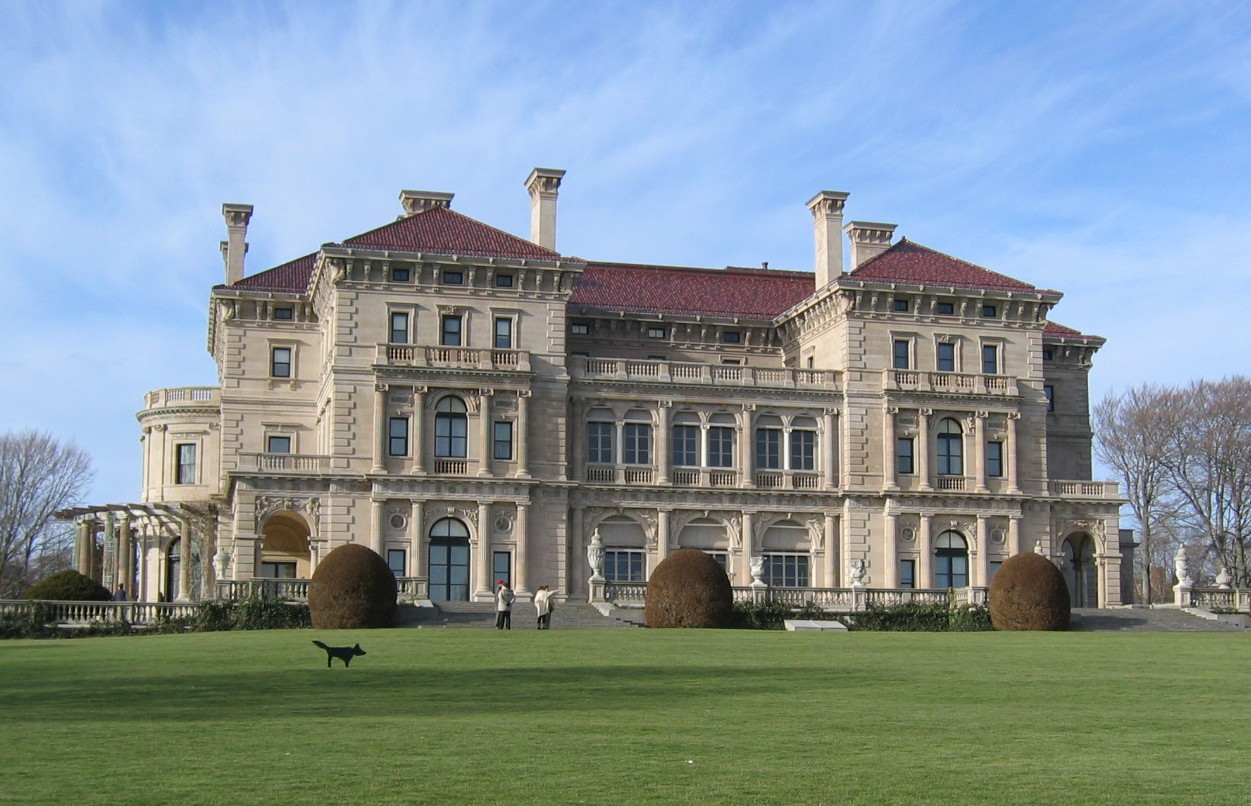
The Breakers, 1895

=== Staircase ===
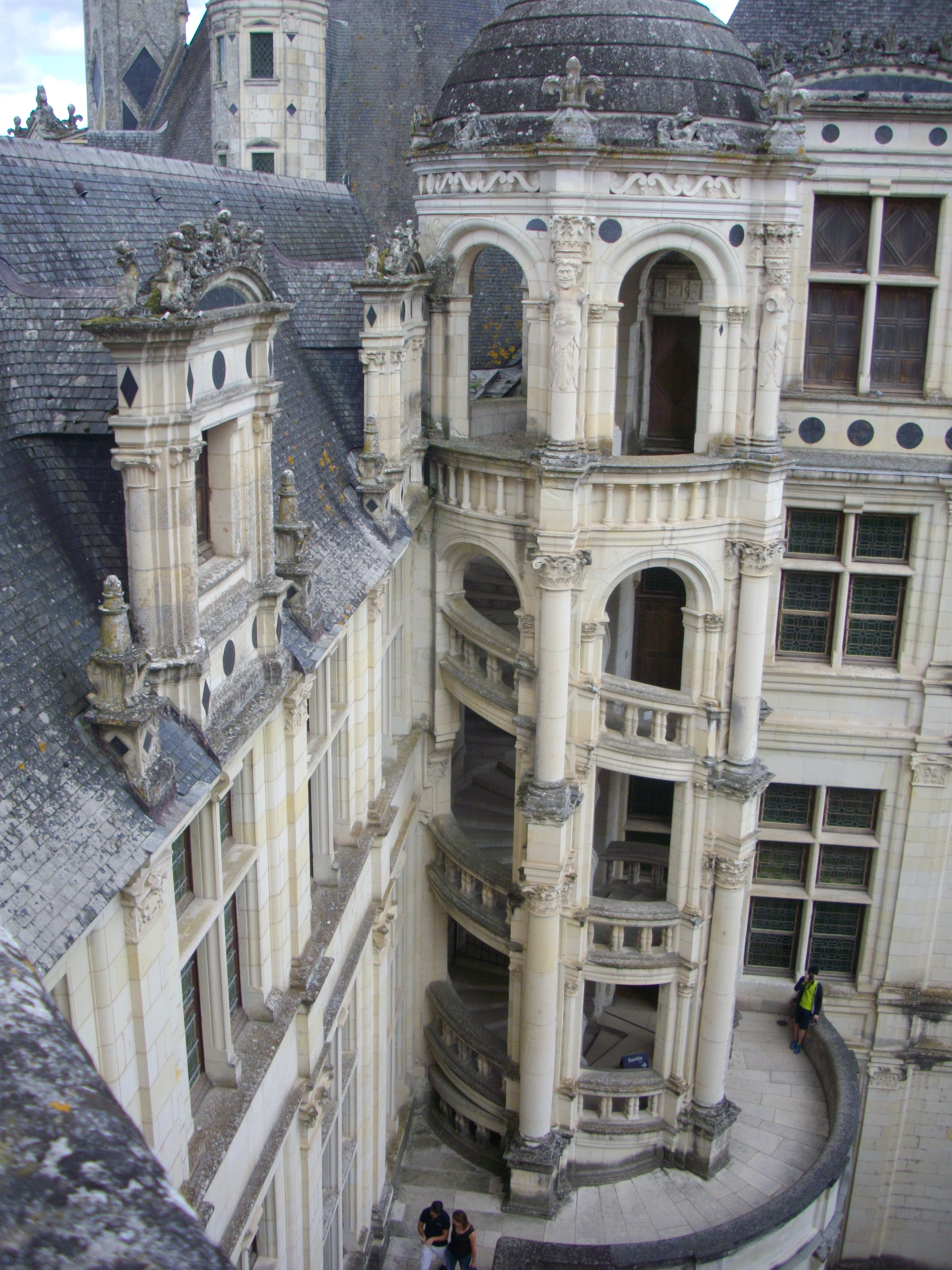
Staircase at the Château de Chambord; 1547. Variations of this design became a popular feature of the Neo-Renaissance.

One of the most widely copied features of Renaissance architecture were the great staircases from the chateaux of Blois and Chambord. Blois had been the favourite residence of the French kings throughout the renaissance. The Francis I wing, completed in 1524, of which the staircase is an integral part was one of the earliest examples of French Renaissance. French renaissance architecture was a combination of the earlier Gothic style coupled with a strong Italian influence represented by arches, arcades, balustrading and, in general, a more flowing line of design than had been apparent in the earlier Gothic. The Chateau de Blois's triumphal staircase was imitated almost from the moment of its completion, and was certainly the predecessor of the "double staircase" (sometimes attributed to Leonardo da Vinci) at the Château de Chambord just a few years later.

A Grand Staircase whether based on that of Blois, or the Villa Farnese was to become one of the features of Neo-Renaissance design. It became a common feature for the staircase to be not just a feature of the internal architecture but also the external. But whereas at Blois the stairs had been open to the elements in the 19th century new and innovative use of glass was able to give protection from the weather, giving the staircase the appearance of being in the true renaissance open style, when it was in fact a truly internal feature. Further and more adventurous use of glass also enabled the open and arcaded Renaissance courtyards to be reproduced as lofty halls with glazed roofs. This was a feature at Mentmore Towers and on a far larger scale at the Warsaw University of Technology, where the large glazed court contained a monumental staircase. The "Warsaw University of Technology staircase", though if Renaissance in spirit at all, is more in the lighter, more columned style of Ottaviano Nonni's (named il Mascherino) staircase designed for Pope Gregory XIII at Rome's Palazzo Quirinale in 1584, thus demonstrating that architects wherever their location were selecting their Neo-Renaissance styles regardless of geography

== Combined historicism ==
=== Gothic influences on the Renaissance Revival ===
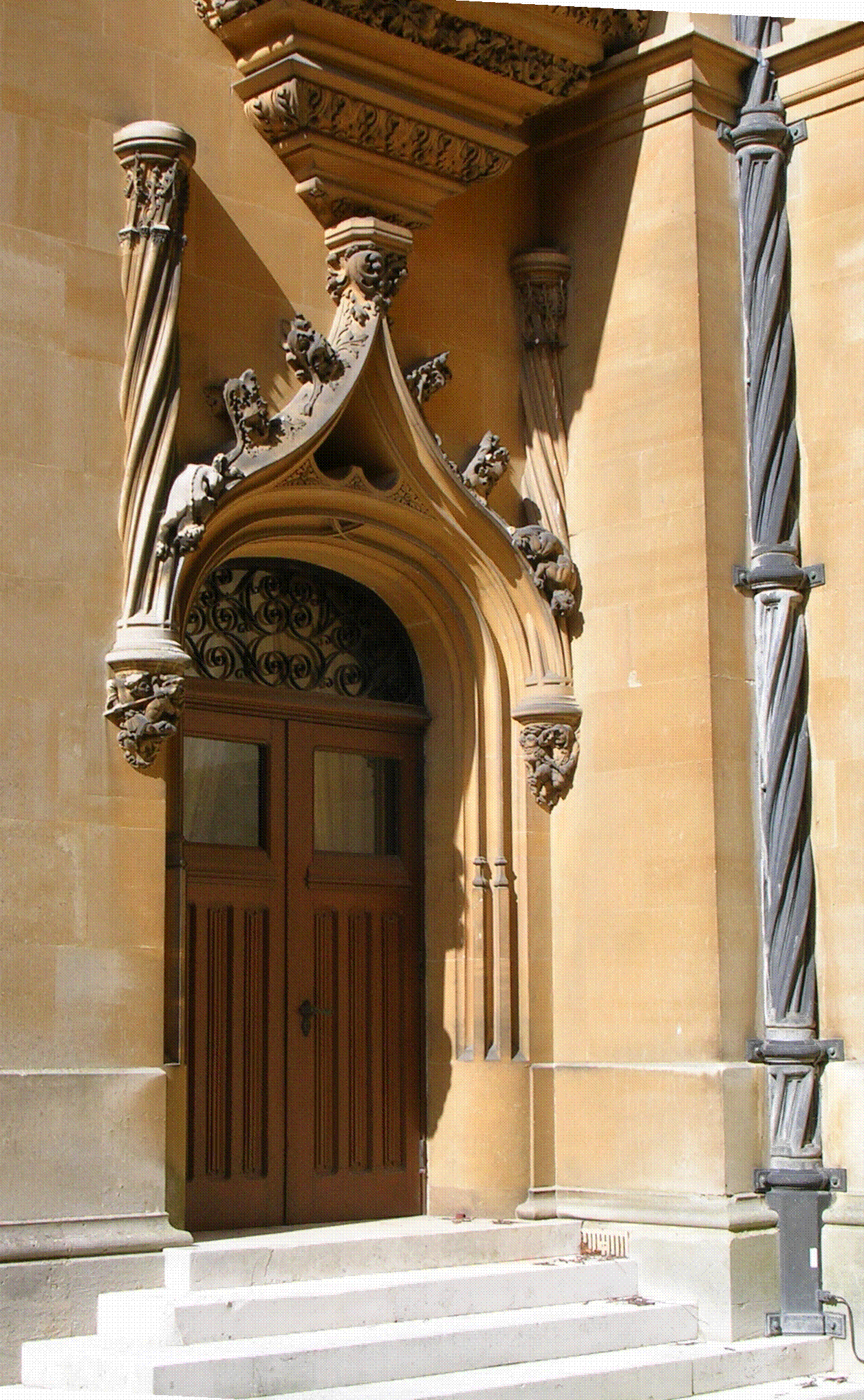
This Renaissance Revival doorway illustrates a Gothic influence on French Renaissance design. A basket-handle portal is surmounted by a floral ogee hood moulding.

Gothic influences on both period and revived Renaissance architecture are readily apparent, first as much building occurred during the period of transition from the Gothic to the Renaissance style; and also as Renaissance−era design took the form of the addition of Renaissance ornamentation to Gothic−era buildings thus creating an accretion of details from disparate sources. Architects who designed in the Renaissance Revival style usually avoided any references to Gothic Revival architecture, drawing instead on a variety of other classically based styles. However, there are exceptions and occasionally the two distinct styles are mixed. The sub-variety of Gothic design most frequently employed is floral Venetian Gothic, as seen in the Doge's Palace courtyard, built in the 1480s.

=== Baroque influences on the Renaissance Revival ===
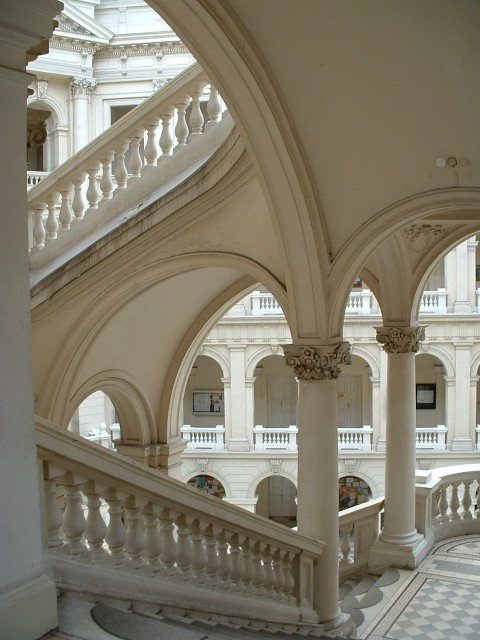
The staircase at the Warsaw University of Technology, with strong Baroque Revival influences.

A common Baroque feature introduced into the Renaissance Revival styles was the "imperial staircase" (a single straight flight dividing into two separate flights).

The staircase at Mentmore Towers designed by Joseph Paxton, and the one at the Warsaw University of Technology designed by Bronisław Rogóyski and Stefan Szyller (late 19th century), both rise from pastiches of true Renaissance courtyards. Both staircases seem more akin to Balthasar Neumann's great Baroque staircase at the Würzburg Residenz than anything found in a true Renaissance Palazzo. The apparent Baroque style staircase at Mentmore is not without a Renaissance influence, its first flight is similar to "The staircase of the Giants" rises from the Doge's Palace Courtyard, designed when the Venetian Gothic was being uncomfortably merged with Renaissance style. Similarly to that at Mentmore, the Staircase of the Giant's terminates on to an arcaded loggia. Perhaps not ironically the Hall and Staircase at Mentmore were designed by Paxton to display furniture formerly housed in the Doge's Palace.

Paris is home to many historicist buildings that partake equally from Renaissance and Baroque source material, such as the Opera Garnier. However, the Parisian Hôtel de Ville faithfully replicates the true French Renaissance style, complete with the steeply pitched roofs and towers, as it was a reconstruction, completed c. 1880, of the previous Hôtel de Ville.

In the British Raj in 1880, the façades of the 1777 Writers' building in Kolkata were redesigned in the Renaissance Revival style then popular in colonial India, though this version was remarkable in its unique design. Loggias of Serlian arches deceptively form an almost Indian appearance, yet they sit beneath a mansard roof. In what at first glance appears to be an Indian building, on closer examination shows a Historicist example of Classical Palladianism combined with the French Renaissance, a uniquely distinctive interpretation of the Renaissance Revival style.

== Renaissance Revival interiors ==
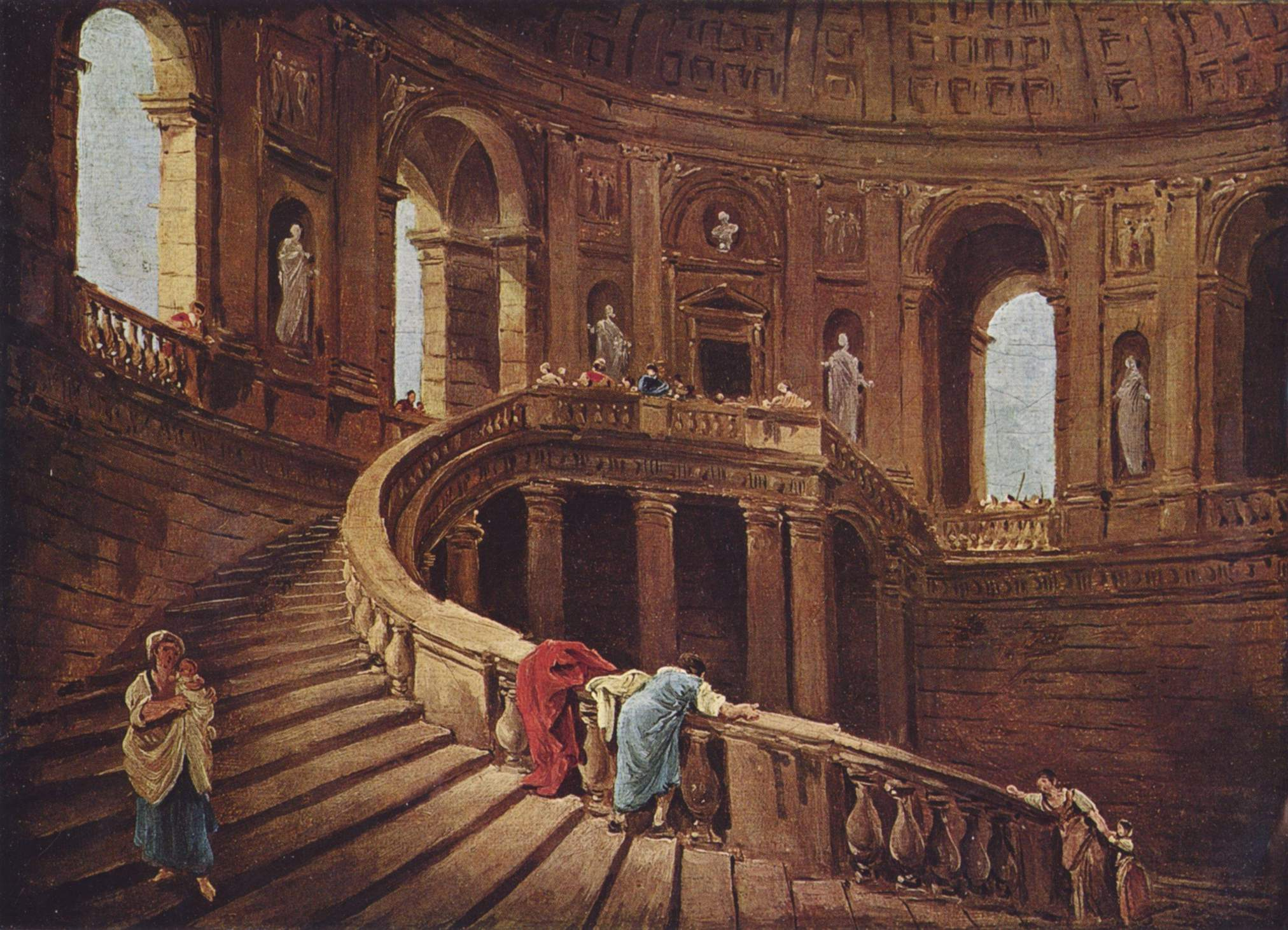
Mannerism: the Villa Farnese: the curved staircase, tall segmented windows, and marble balustrading were features frequently reproduced in the 19th century revival.

As mentioned above, the Neo-Renaissance style was in reality an eclectic blending of past styles, which the architect selected on the whims of his patrons. In the true Renaissance era there was a division of labour between the architect, who designed the exterior highly visible shell, and others—the artisans—who decorated and arranged the interior. The original Italian mannerist house was a place for relaxation and entertaining, convenience and comfort of the interior being a priority; in the later Baroque designs, comfort and interior design were secondary to outward appearance.

This was followed by the Neoclassical period, which gave importance to the proportions and dignity of interiors, but still lost the comfort and internal convenience of the mannerist period. It was during the Neo-Renaissance period of the 19th century that the mannerist comforts were re-discovered and taken a step further. Not only did the improved building techniques of the 1850s allow the glazing of formerly open loggias and arches with the newly invented sheets of plate glass, providing the first "picture windows", but also the blending of architectural styles allowed interiors and exteriors to be treated differently. It was at this time that the concept of "furnishing styles" manifested itself, allowing distinctions to be made between interior rooms and external appearances, and indeed between the various rooms themselves.

Thus the modern concept of treating a room individually, and differently from its setting and neighbours, came into its infancy. Classic examples of this are the great Rothschild house in Buckinghamshire, hybrids of various Renaissance chateaux, and 16th century English country houses, all with interiors ranging from "Versailles" to "Medici", and in the case of Mentmore Towers a huge central hall, resembling the arcaded courtyard of a Renaissance villa, conveniently glazed over, furnished in Venetian style and heated by a fireplace designed by Rubens for his house in Antwerp

== Legacy ==
By the beginning of the 20th century, Neo-Renaissance was a commonplace sight on the main streets of thousands of towns, large and small, around the world. In southern Europe the Neo-Renaissance style began to fall from favour c. 1900. However, it was still extensively practiced in the 1910s in Saint Petersburg and Buenos Aires by such architects as Leon Benois, Marian Peretyatkovich, or Francisco Tamburini (picture).

In England it was so common that today one finds "Renaissance Italian Palazzi" serving as banks or municipal buildings in the centres of even the smallest towns. It has been said "It is a well-known fact that the nineteenth century had no art style of its own." While to an extent this may be true, the same could be said of most eras until the early 20th century, the Neo-Renaissance in the hands of provincial architects did develop into a style not always instantly recognisable as a derivative of the Renaissance. In this less obvious guise the Neo-Renaissance was to provide an important undercurrent in totalitarian architecture of various countries, notably in Stalinist architecture of the Soviet Union, as seen in some pavilions of the All-Soviet Exhibition Centre.

Neo-Renaissance architecture, because of its diversity, is perhaps the only style of architecture to have existed in so many forms, yet still common to so many countries.

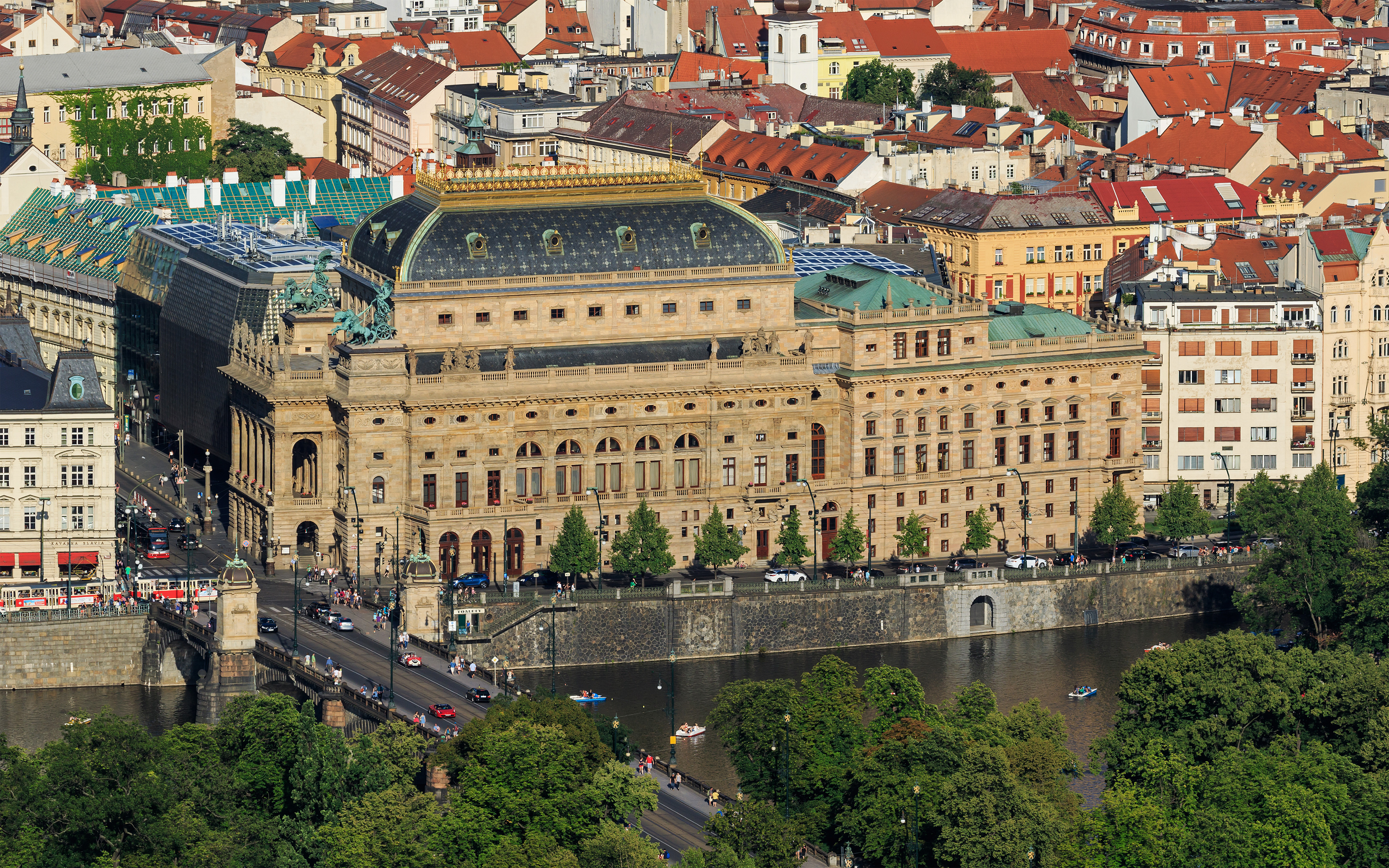
Prague's National Theatre (Czech Republic), 1862

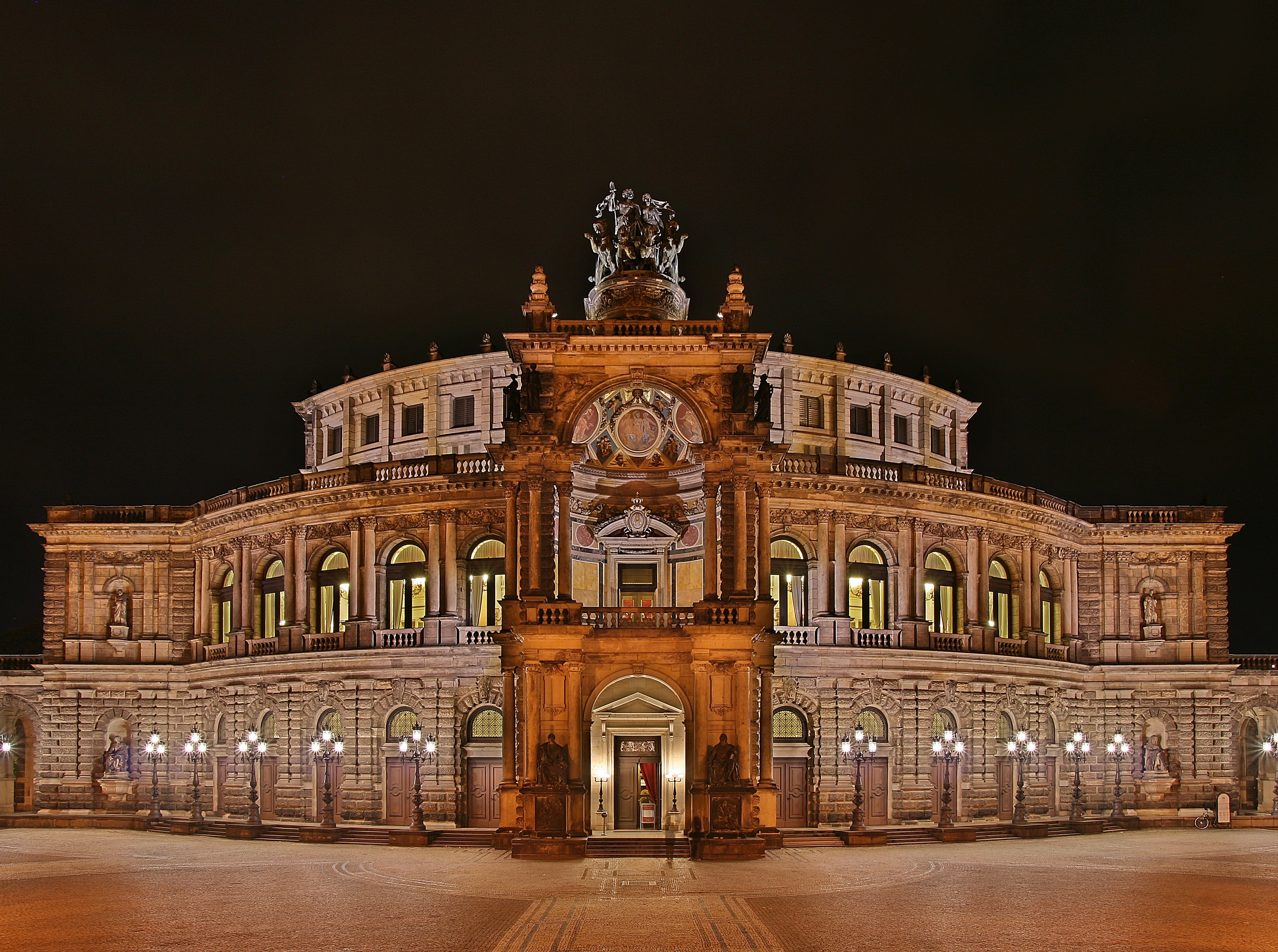
Gottfried Semper's Dresden Semper Opera House of 1870, incorporating both Baroque and Renaissance architectural features

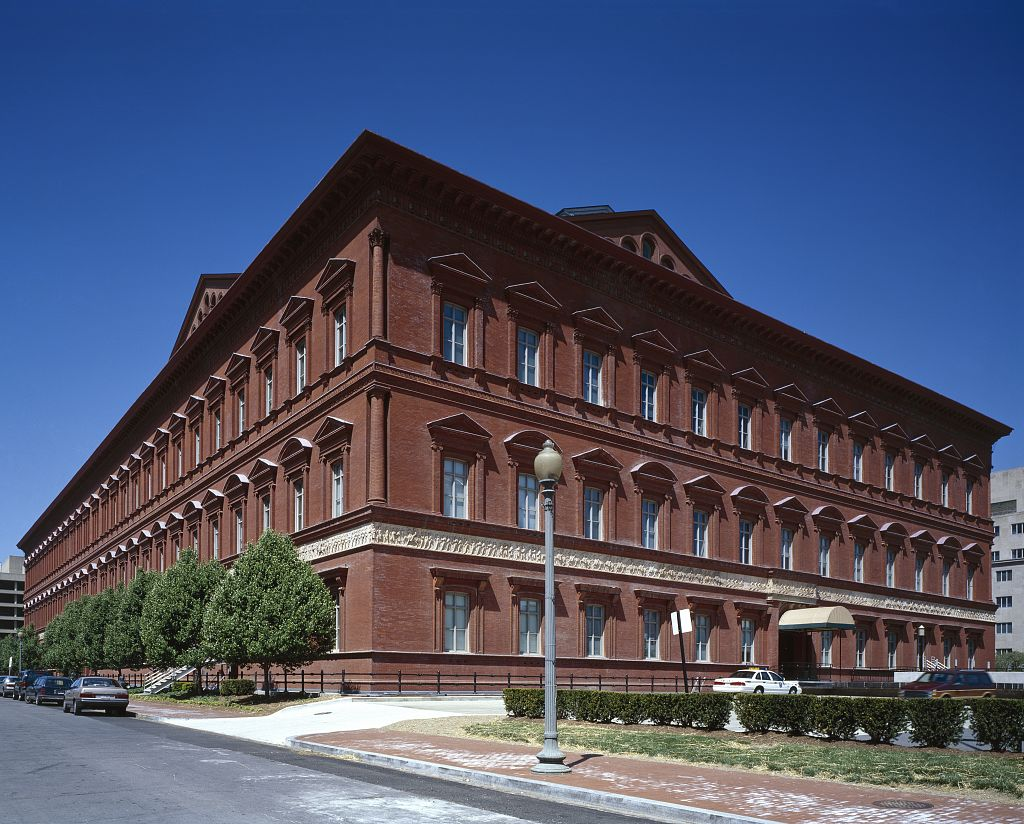
National Building Museum, Washington D.C.

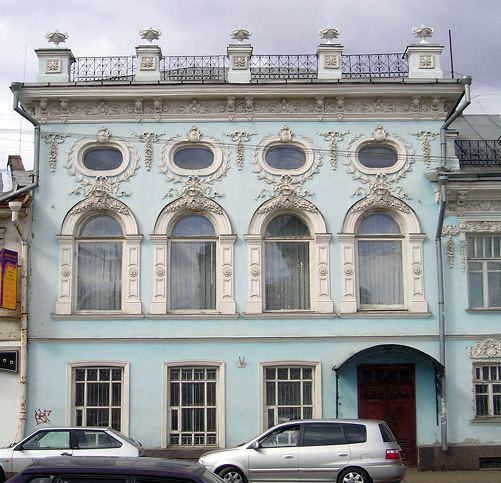
Neo-Renaissance Russian style: a little recorded, Neo-Renaissance building showing Baroque and Rococo influences in Yaroslavl, Russia

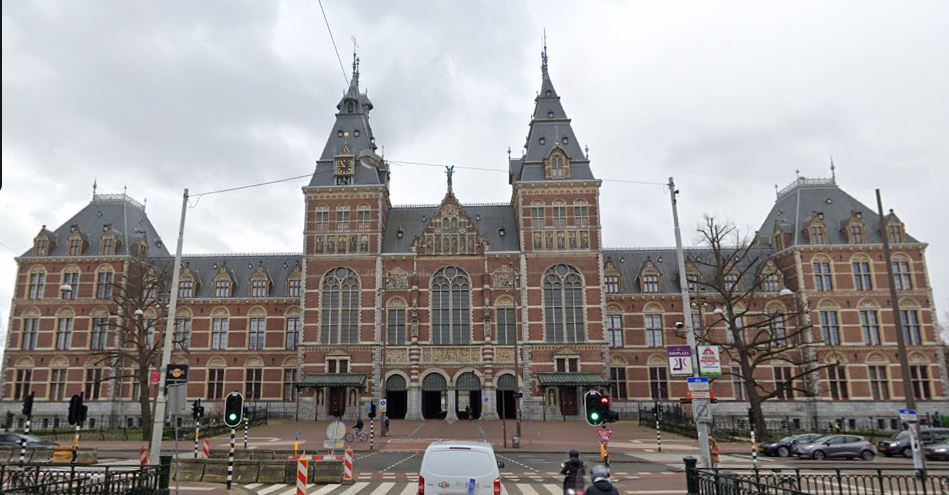
Rijksmuseum (Amsterdam) from 1885, designed by Pierre Cuypers

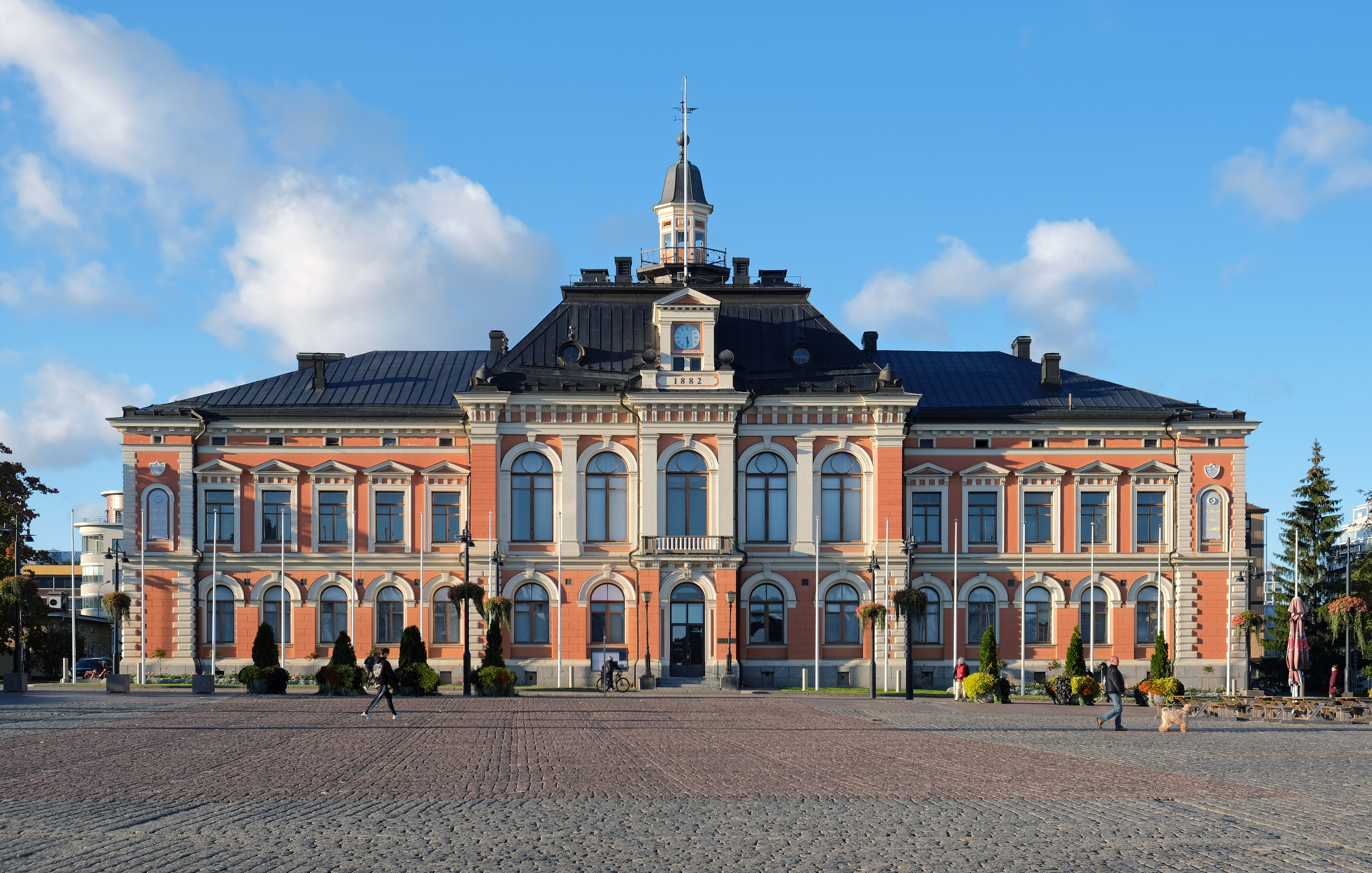
Neo-Renaissance-styled Kuopio Town Hall from 1886, designed by F. A. Sjöström

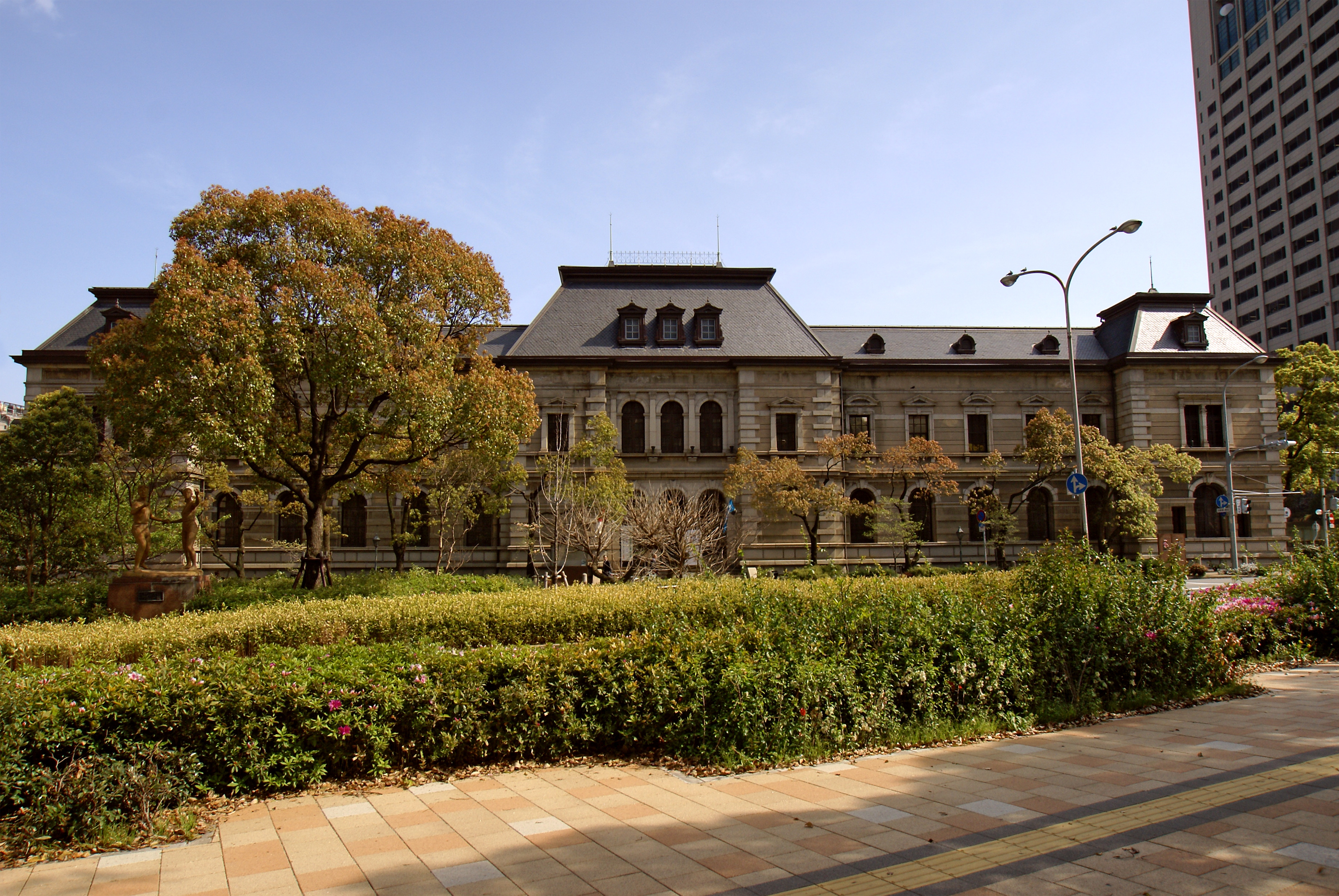
Former Hyōgo Prefecture Building, 1902

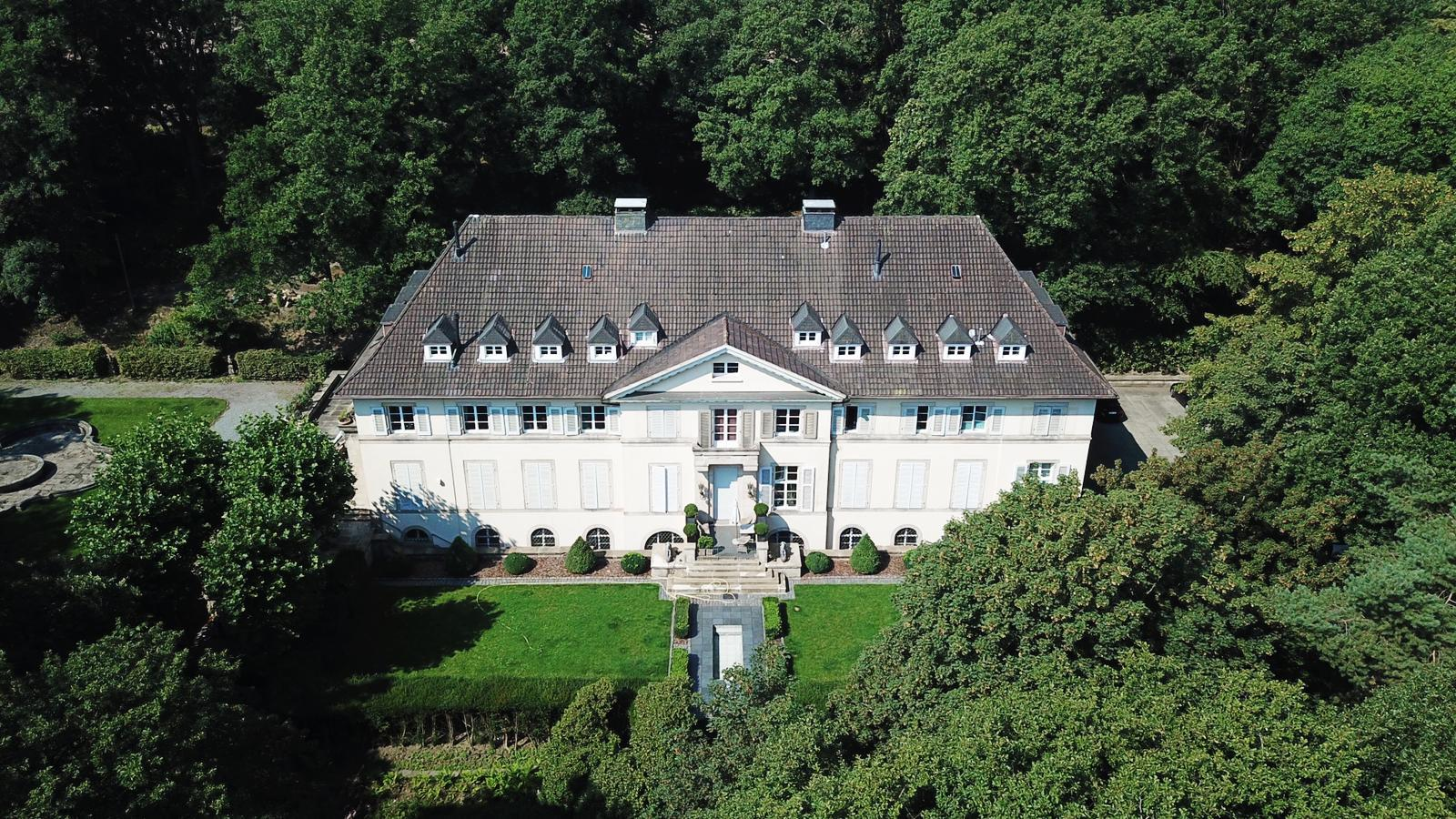
Briller Viertel – Wuppertal – Haus Höhe
