= Edificio Comercial Edwards =

National monument of Chile

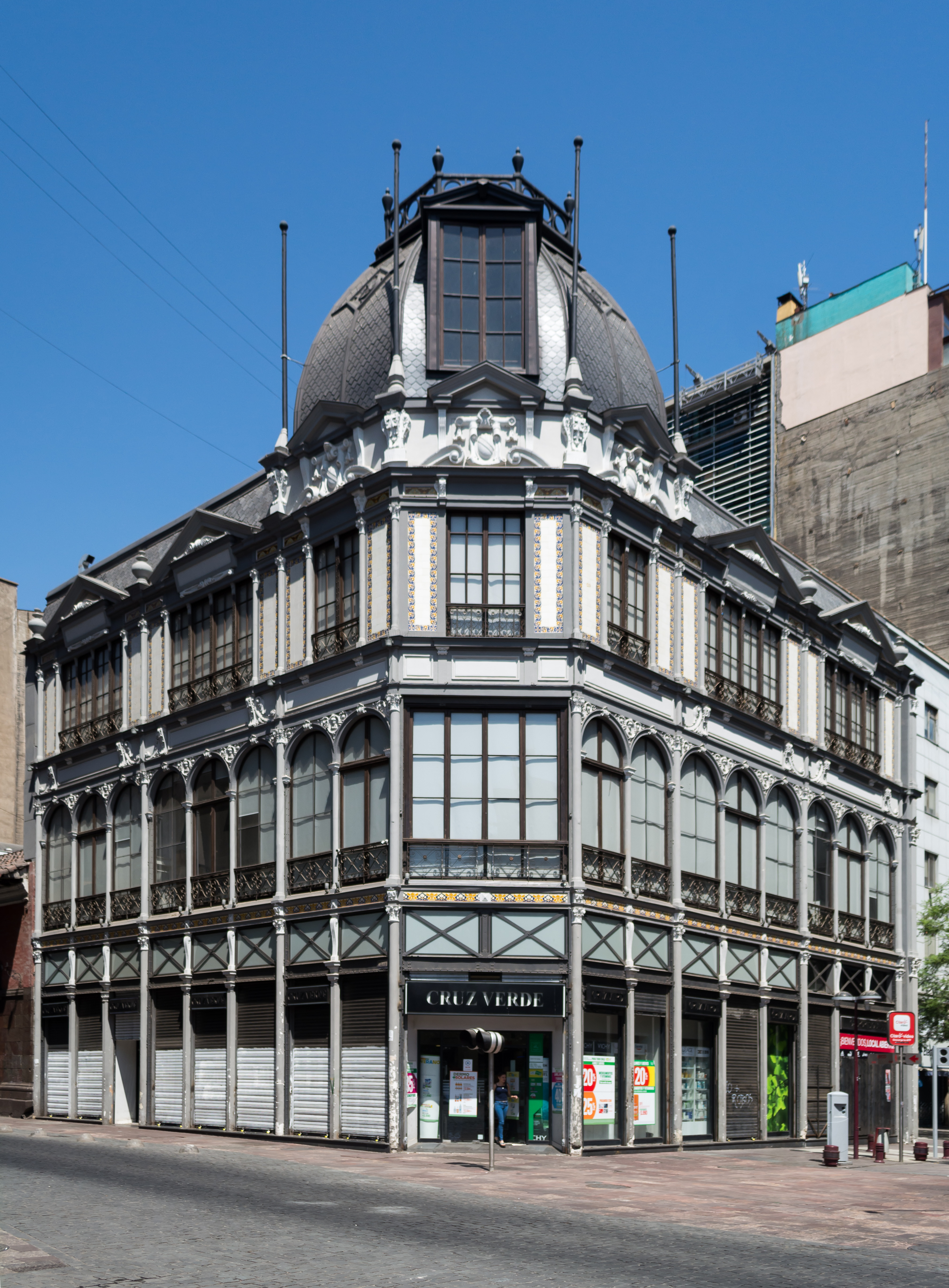
- The building in 2020
- Interactive map of the Edificio Comercial Edwards area

General information
- Coordinates: 33°26′18″S 70°38′58″W

The Edificio Comercial Edwards is a cast-iron building used for retail, which is located at the corner of Merced and Paseo Estado streets, on the southeast side of the Plaza de Armas of Santiago. It was designed by Eugenio Joannon and prefabricated in France in 1892, for later being assembled in Chile.

In 1902, Agustín Edwards Mac-Clure acquired the property to transfer it to his brother Raúl, who sold the building to Agustín Gómez. The property was awarded to the Banco Español in 1909 and sold to the Archdiocese of Santiago in 1910. In the 1930s, the building changed hands once again to the Mutual de la Armada, and in 1942 the property was purchased by Etelvino Villanueva, to lease retail space on its first floor.

In 1972 the building was declared a Monumento Histórico, and in 1986 went on to form part of the Zona Típica (Heritage District) of the historic downtown of Santiago.

== Description ==
The facade features large rectangular openings on the ground floor, semicircular arched windows on the second floor and pedimented windows separated by mosaic-covered panels on the third floor. It also features a chamfered corner, which is topped by a cupola.
