= Plaza de Armas (Santiago) =

Main square of Santiago, Chile

Coordinates: 33°26′16″S 70°39′01″W

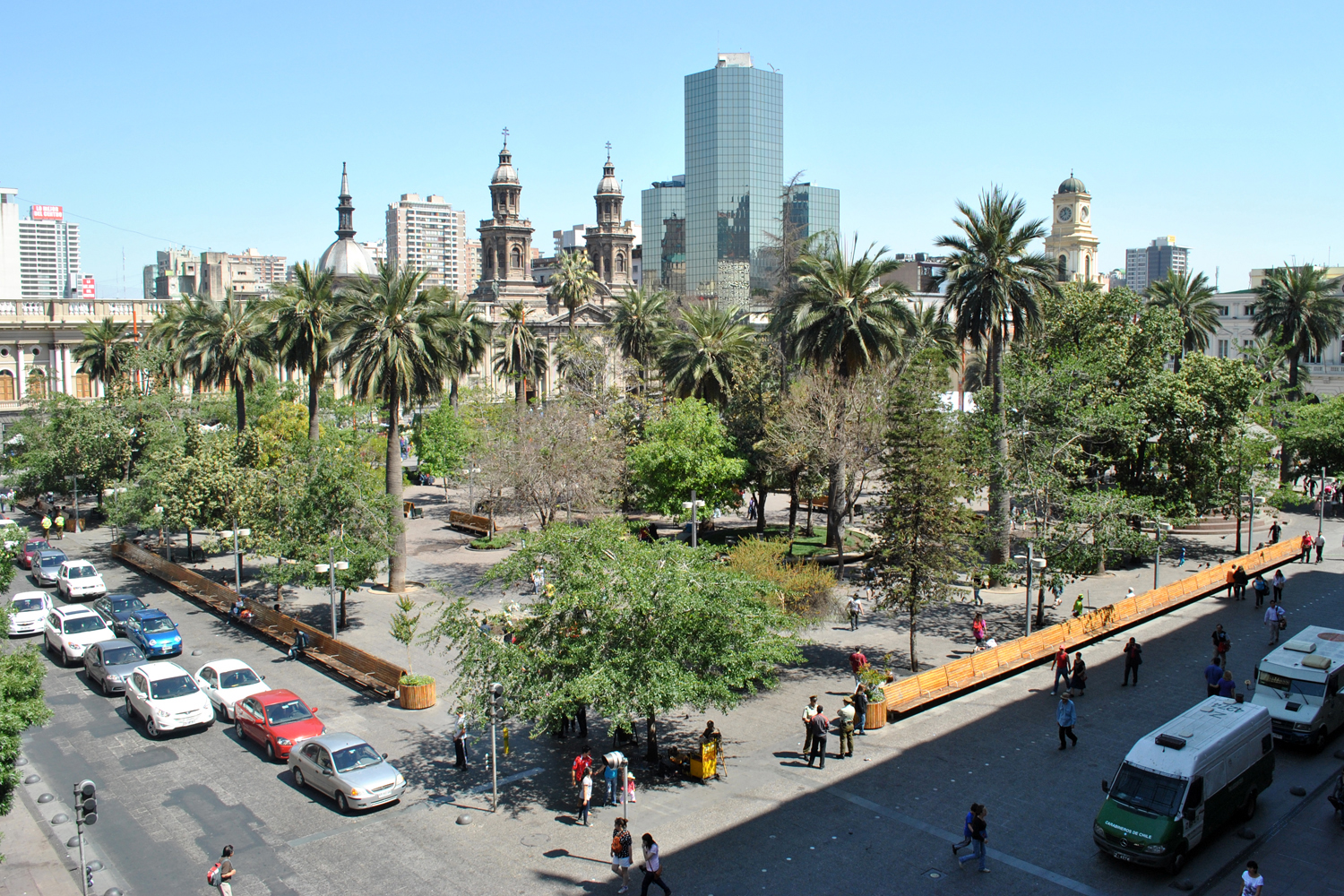
Plaza de Armas.

The Plaza de Armas is the main square of Santiago, the capital of Chile. Plaza de Armas metro station is located under the square. Surrounding the square are some historic buildings, including the Metropolitan Cathedral of Santiago, Central Post Office Building, Palacio de la Real Audiencia de Santiago, and the building that serves as the seat of local government for Santiago, which was formerly occupied by the Cabildo of the city before being remodeled. There are also other architecturally significant buildings that face the square, including the Capilla del Sagrario, the Palacio arzobispal, the Edificio Comercial Edwards, and the Portal Fernández Concha. The Casa Colorada, the Cuartel General del Cuerpo de Bomberos de Santiago and the Museo Chileno de Arte Precolombino are located a short walk from the square.

The square, the nearby former National Congress building and surrounding buildings were registered on 3 December 1986 as a national monument as a zona típica.

== History ==
The church is the centerpiece of the initial layout of Santiago, which has a square grid pattern. This urban design was accomplished by Pedro de Gamboa, who was appointed by Pedro de Valdivia in 1541.

=== Pre Hispanic Period (Pre Colonisation) ===
The Investigator Rubén Stehberg from the Museo Nacional de Historia Natural de Chile and Gonzalo Sotomayor of the Universidad Andrés Bello provided evidence in 1976, arguing that under the old city of Santiago where the Plaza de Armas is situated there is an old Inca settlement.

There would have been a Tawantinsuyu (Inca Empire) urban centre, under the old city of Santiago, from which Inca roads went out in different directions and whose base of sustenance was hydro-agriculture and gold and silver mining, [...] the infrastructure of this installation would have been used by (the Spanish conqueror) Pedro de Valdivia to found the city of Santiago.

— Rubén Stehberg

=== Spanish Imperial Period ===
The Chilean Capital was founded by Pedro de Valdivia. With a chequerboard format, similar to a Chess board, it was designed by the architect Pedro de Gamboa. It was thus planned to build a central square around which the main administrative buildings were to be erected. This square or plaza was erected above the old city or Cancha inca.

Around the plaza formed recovas or markets, as goods arrived in this area during the Colonial period. In the middle there was a galley to hang the sentenced and show royal power.

== Freedom of Latin America monument ==
The monument is located at the center of the square and depicts an allegory of Freedom, with a woman breaking the chains of a native woman. It is made of Carrara marble and sculpted by Francesco Orselino. The monument replaced a bronze fountain made in 1671, which is presently located in La Moneda Palace.

Other commemorative structures include an equestrian statue of Pedro de Valdivia, a statue of James the Great, the indigenous peoples monument, a time capsule, and ground plaques, including that marking the kilometre zero of Santiago.

== Entorno ==
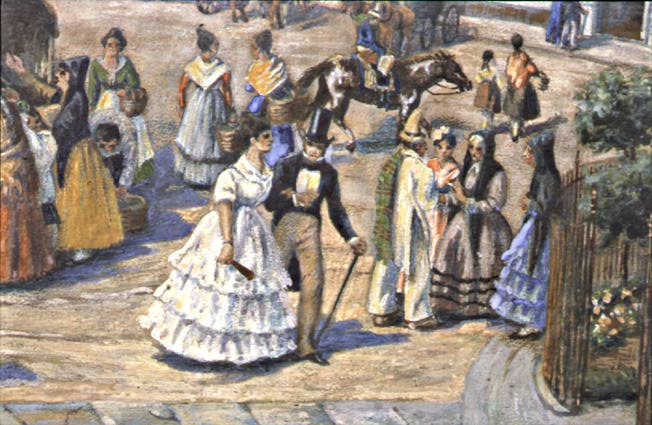
Historical Depiction of the Plaza de Armas

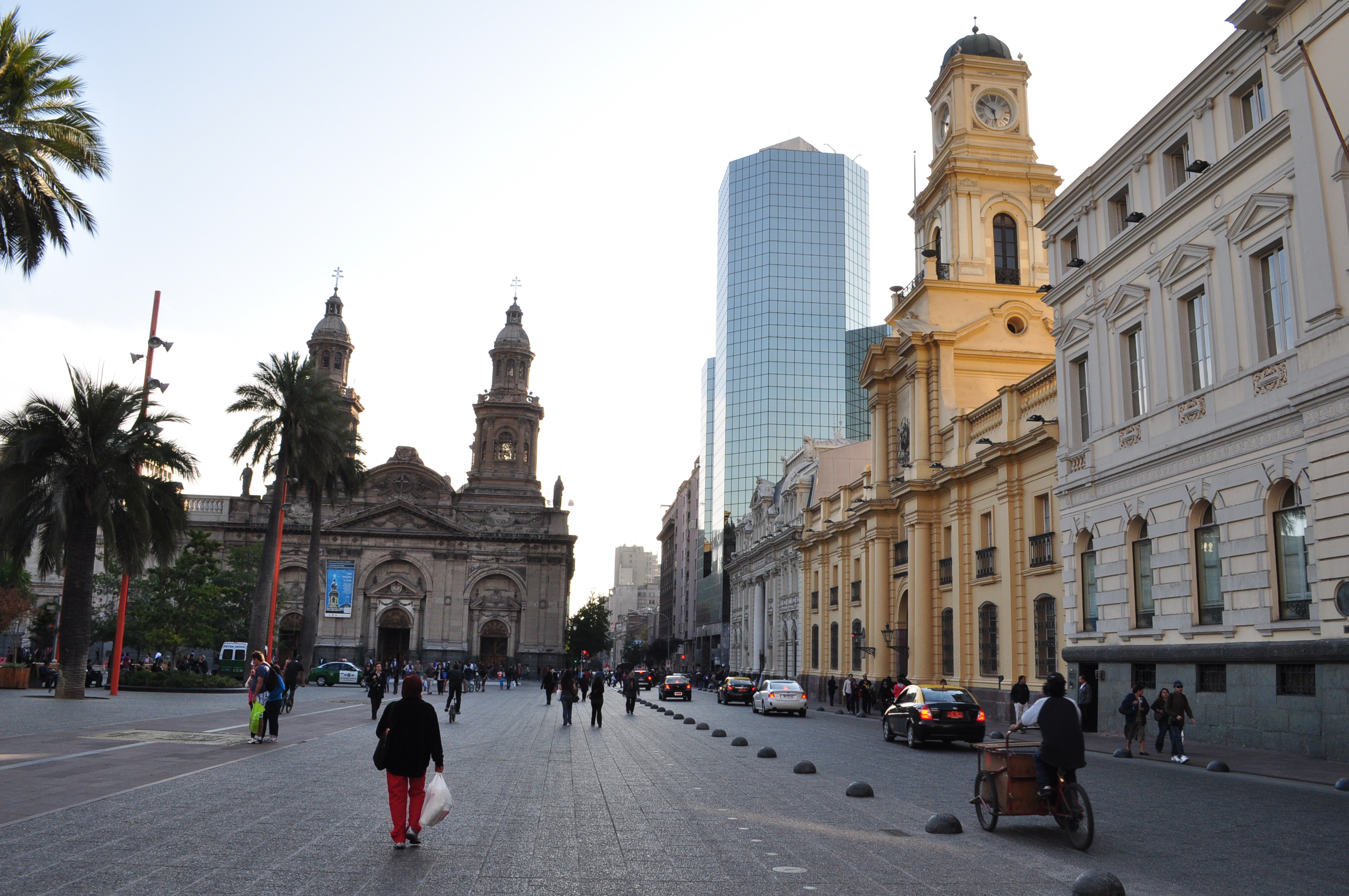
Modern Photos of the Plaza

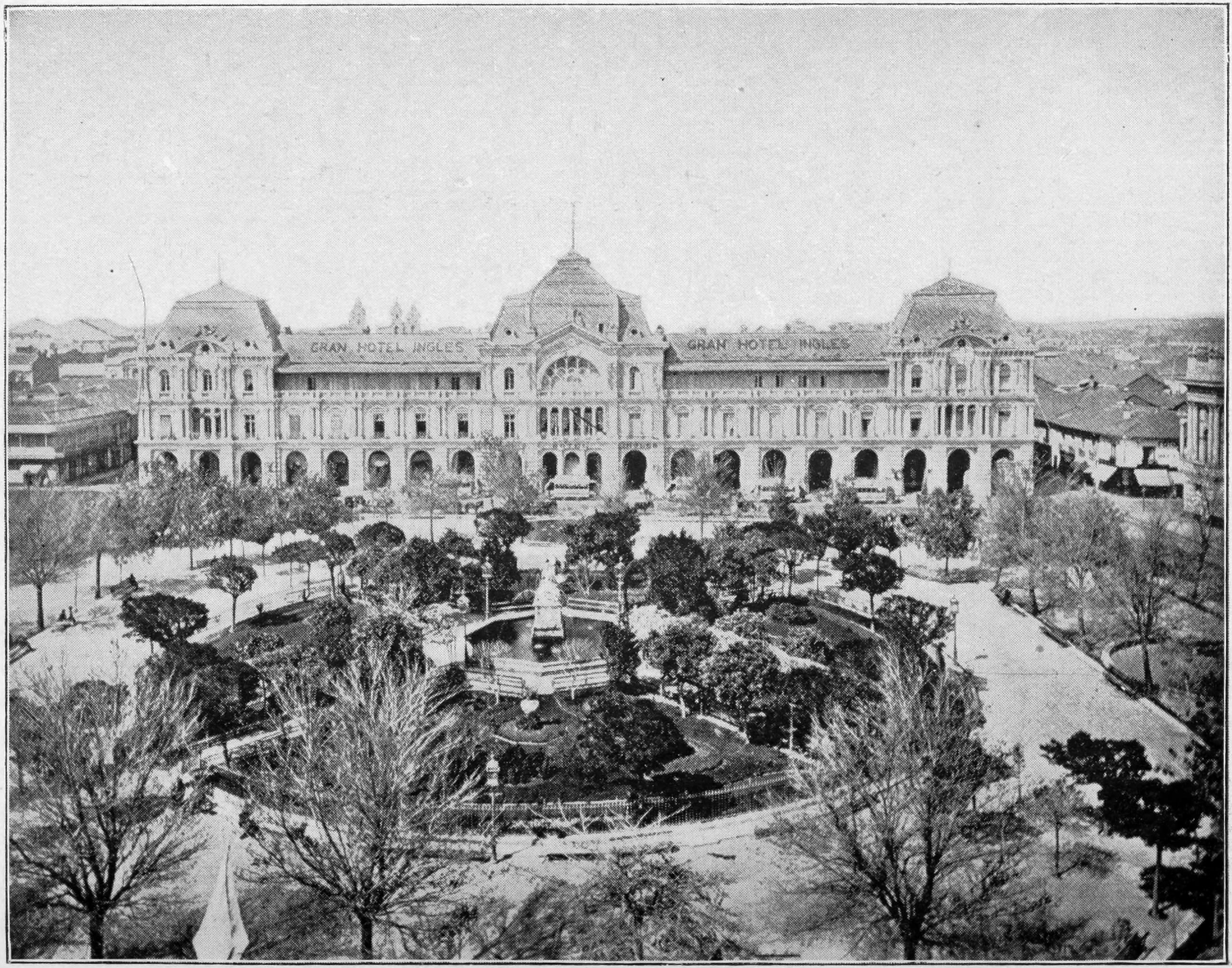
Plaza de Armas - Portal Fernandez Concha before 1928 reformation

On the west side of the square, on the northwest corner, is the Catedral Metropolitana de Santiago. Although the first construction of a church was carried out in conjunction with the founding of the city, the present building is the fifth to be built on the site. Construction began in 1748 and was completed in 1775. However, in 1780, the architect Joaquín Toesca designed a new façade for the Cathedral and the adjoining Iglesia del Sagrario. At the end of the century Ignacio Cremonesi was commissioned by Bishop Casanova to carry out an integral remodelling of the cathedral, which included new façades, a modification of the interior nave and the construction of two towers facing the square and a dome over the main altar.

Facing the north side of the Plaza are the old colonial government buildings. From west to east, the actual Correo Central, the Museo Histórico Nacional and the Ilustre Municipalidad de Santiago are located.

The building of the Central Post Office of Santiago occupies the site assigned in the foundation to the conqueror Pedro de Valdivia, where later the residence of the Governors of Chile and, after independence, of the Presidents was built until 1846, when the presidential residence was moved to the Palace of La Moneda. However, a fire almost completely destroyed the building, and it was restored in 1881, giving it the neoclassical style it has today. In 1903 a third floor and an upper dome were built.

The Museo Histórico Nacional is located in the former building of the Palacio de la Real Audiencia, the main colonial court in the country. Built between 1804 and 1807 by a disciple of Toesca, after the Independence of Chile it was the seat of various ministries until they were moved to La Moneda, as was the presidential residence. In 1982 the current museum was opened, bringing together various historical collections.

The building of the Municipality occupies the site where the colonial cabildo of the city and the old colonial jail, built between 1578 and 1647, were originally built. In 1679, the second construction of the building was demolished and rebuilt by Toesca, now in neoclassical styles in 1790. A fire in 1891 forced a reconstruction by the architect Eugenio Joannon, and the new building was inaugurated in 1895 and officially declared the seat of the communal administration.

Around the Plaza there are also various commercial premises, such as the Portal Fernández Concha, located in front of the southern side of the Plaza. This shopping centre was built in 1869 and gathers both typical Chilean and international food shops and shops with different articles. In the area around the Cathedral, in the streets Puente and Catedral, there is an area that has been informally called "Little Lima" due to the large number of immigrants of Peruvian origin and commerce destined to serve them that has settled nearby.

== See also ==
- Plaza de Armas
- La Parva
