= Iglesia de la Compañía Fire =

1863 fire in Santiago, Chile

Coordinates: 33.438474°S 70.652772°W

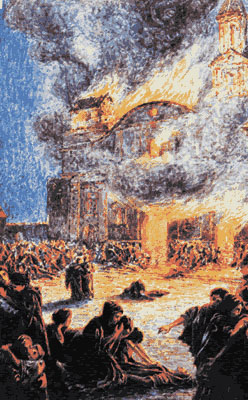
- Date: 8 December 1863; 162 years ago
- Time: Before 7 P.M.
- Location: Santiago, Chile
- Deaths: 2,000-3,000 dead

The Iglesia de la Compañía de Jesús Fire (8 December 1863) was a mass casualty event in Santiago, Chile. It is the deadliest fire known to have occurred in the city, one of the deadliest single-building fires in world history and one of the deadliest-ever fires within a religious site. Between 2,000 and 3,000 people died, most of whom were women.

The fire originated at the start of a mass being held to celebrate the Feast of the Immaculate Conception. The tragedy led directly to the establishment of the city's first organized firefighter companies, which, since then, have been staffed by volunteers.

== Events ==
The Church of the Society of Jesus (Spanish: Iglesia de la Compañía de Jesús) was a Jesuit church located in downtown Santiago. The day of the fire was the celebration of the Feast of the Immaculate Conception, one of the most popular festivities of the religious calendar, and the temple was adorned with a profusion of candles, oil lamps and wall coverings. In the main altar, a large statue of the Virgin Mary stood over a half-moon that in itself was a huge candelabra.

Accounts of how the fire started vary, although it is agreed that it started around 7 PM. Some reports suggests that an oil lamp at the top of the main altar ignited some of the veils that adorned the walls. Some early accounts blamed a gas lamp, as people tried to make sense of the shocking tragedy amid old and new technology, but the church was not equipped with gas. This error was repeated by newspapers as far away as Australia. Other records suggest that a strong wind blew the doors, which could open inwards, open during the liturgy. This wind knocked a candle off the podium and disrupted the meeting of worshippers. What is known is that the fire roared through the church and resulted in its destruction. More than 2,500 people died in the fire.

Somebody tried to put it out by smothering it with another cloth, but managed only to make the fire jump over to the rest of the veils and from there on to the wood roof. The attendees, mostly women, panicked and tried to escape but the side doors had been closed in order to leave space to accommodate more people and could only be opened inwards, leaving the main entrance as the primary escape route for most occupants in the church. Men were seated separately from women with an iron grating between them, and most of the men quickly escaped, many of them returning to the burning church to try to rescue those still trapped.

The priests retreated into the sacristy, and some of the men tried to escape by following them. The priests were gathering together the valuables of the church to save them, and they closed the door to the sacristy so they could do this in peace. No one escaped through the sacristy after the door was closed. The priests then left the scene, all unharmed, with what valuables they were able to save from the blaze.

The main door became jammed with a pile of approximately 200 women and children, which made it impassable. Eventually the side doors were also opened, but they also became jammed. Rescuers were able to pull about 50 people from these heaps.

Upon being notified of the tragedy, U.S. Envoy to Chile Thomas H. Nelson rushed to the scene and assisted in rescue operations. Several days after the fire, Nelson was recognized as a "true hero of Chile."

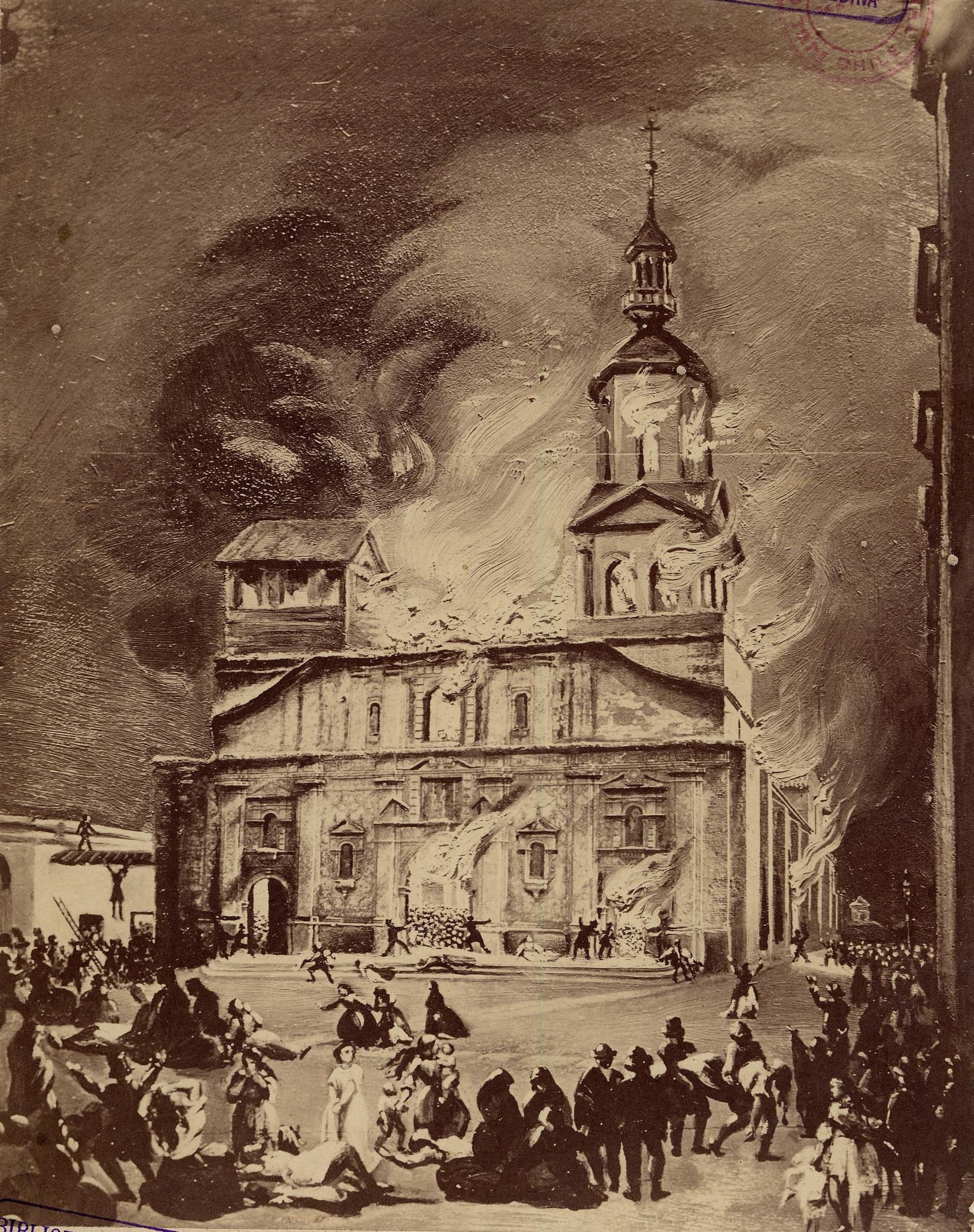
The burning of the church

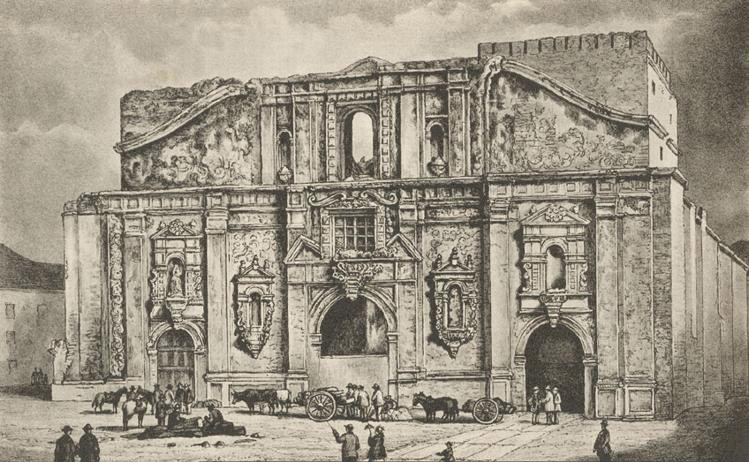
Ruins of the church after the fire

The big hoop skirts worn at the time made escape very difficult if not impossible, causing the people at the front to fall down and be trampled by the ones behind. Very soon the main entrance was blocked by a human wall of bodies, impeding both the exit of the people trapped inside, and entry of rescuers. The main tower of the church was built of wood, while the rest of the church was solid masonry, and finally collapsed inwards around 10 PM.

=== Aftermath ===
Between 2,000 and 3,000 people perished in the fire, in a city that, at the time, had about 100,000 inhabitants. Entire families were wiped out. The cleanup of the bodies took about ten days, and since most of the bodies were burned beyond recognition, they were placed in a mass grave at the Cementerio General de Santiago.

A Santiago newspaper printed the names of over 2,000 known victims, as well as a list of the objects saved by the priests and their value, which led to public outcry against the priests who had saved valuable objects but not people. Already under fire for designing a celebration mass with thousands of candles and oil lamps surrounded by flammable cloths and decorations, Ugarte and his colleagues drew more criticism when they later explained the deaths of so many women and girls as the Virgin Mary needing to take them, without delay, to her bosom.

The remaining walls of the church were torn down, and a garden was planted in the place, with a statue placed at the site where the main altar used to be. A few years later, a second statue replaced the first. The garden and the statues still exist. The second statue is now part of the Ex Congreso Nacional gardens. The original statue is located at the main entrance of the Cementerio General de Santiago.

The church bells were sold for scrap and recovered. One of the bells was melted down to cast two new bells for the new Jesuit church in Santiago. Four made their way to Mumbles, Wales, where they were used to call people to worship until they were returned to Santiago in 2010. Two of the returned bells now hang next to the statue in the Ex Congreso Nacional gardens, one in the courtyard of the Cuartel General de Bomberos, and one at the 14th Fire Company firehouse in Providencia. One bell stayed in Santiago, where it was hung in the Hermita de Santa Lucía on the Santa Lucía Hill in 1872–73, the dent from where it fell remaining as a memorial. The tragedy, and the fact that one of the contributing factors was the lack of an organized fire-brigade, motivated José Luis Claro y Cruz to organize the first Volunteer Firemen's Corps in Santiago, on December 20 of the same year. Fire brigades in Chile, even today, are still made up only of unpaid volunteers. New fire regulations also resulted, and the tragedy contributed to the partial secularization of Chilean government over the next two decades.

Workers excavating for a new line of the Santiago Metro uncovered an unexpected length of the eastern foundation of the church in November 2013. Some Santiaguinos are trying to have the foundation preserved as a memorial.

== See also ==
- List of Jesuit sites
- List of historic fires
- History of firefighting
