= Central Post Office Building (Santiago) =

Coordinates: 33°26′13.45″S 70°39′3.92″W

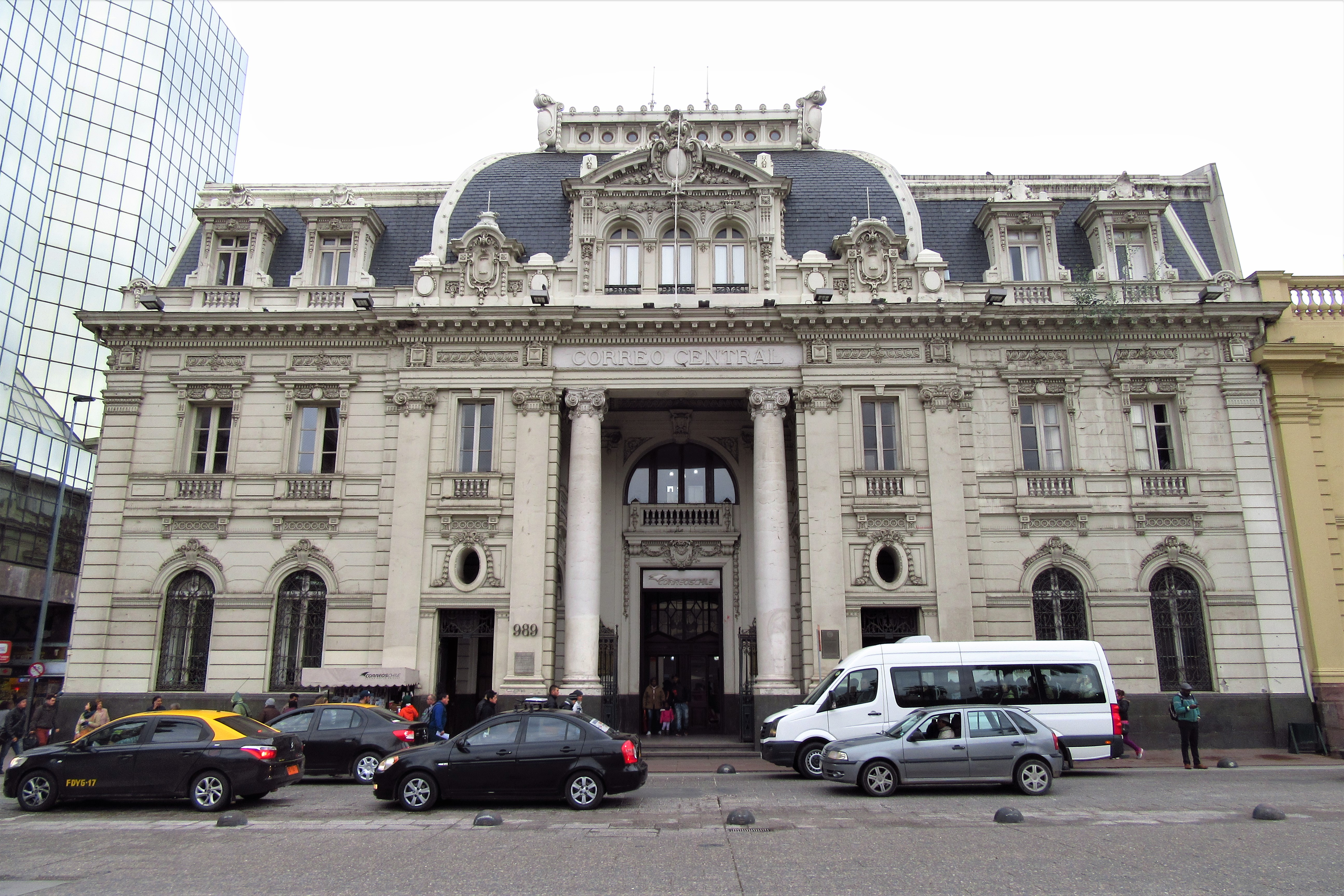
- Interactive map of the Central Post Office Building area

General information
- Location: Santiago, Chile
- Inaugurated: 1908

Design and construction
- Architect: Ricardo Brown

The Central Post Office Building (Spanish: Correo Central de Santiago) is a historic post office building on the northern edge of the Plaza de Armas, in Santiago, Chile. It is adjacent to the Palacio de la Real Audiencia de Santiago and is located on what was the land lot originally owned by Pedro de Valdivia and where he built his house. The site also was occupied by a building that served as Presidential Palace until 1846. Construction of the current building began in 1881 and was designed by Ricardo Brown. Its current appearance dates to 1908.

It was designated a National Monument of Chile in 1976.
