= Archbishop's Palace of Santiago de Chile =

National monument of Chile

Coordinates: 33.4382°S 70.6514°W

Palacio arzobispal de Santiago
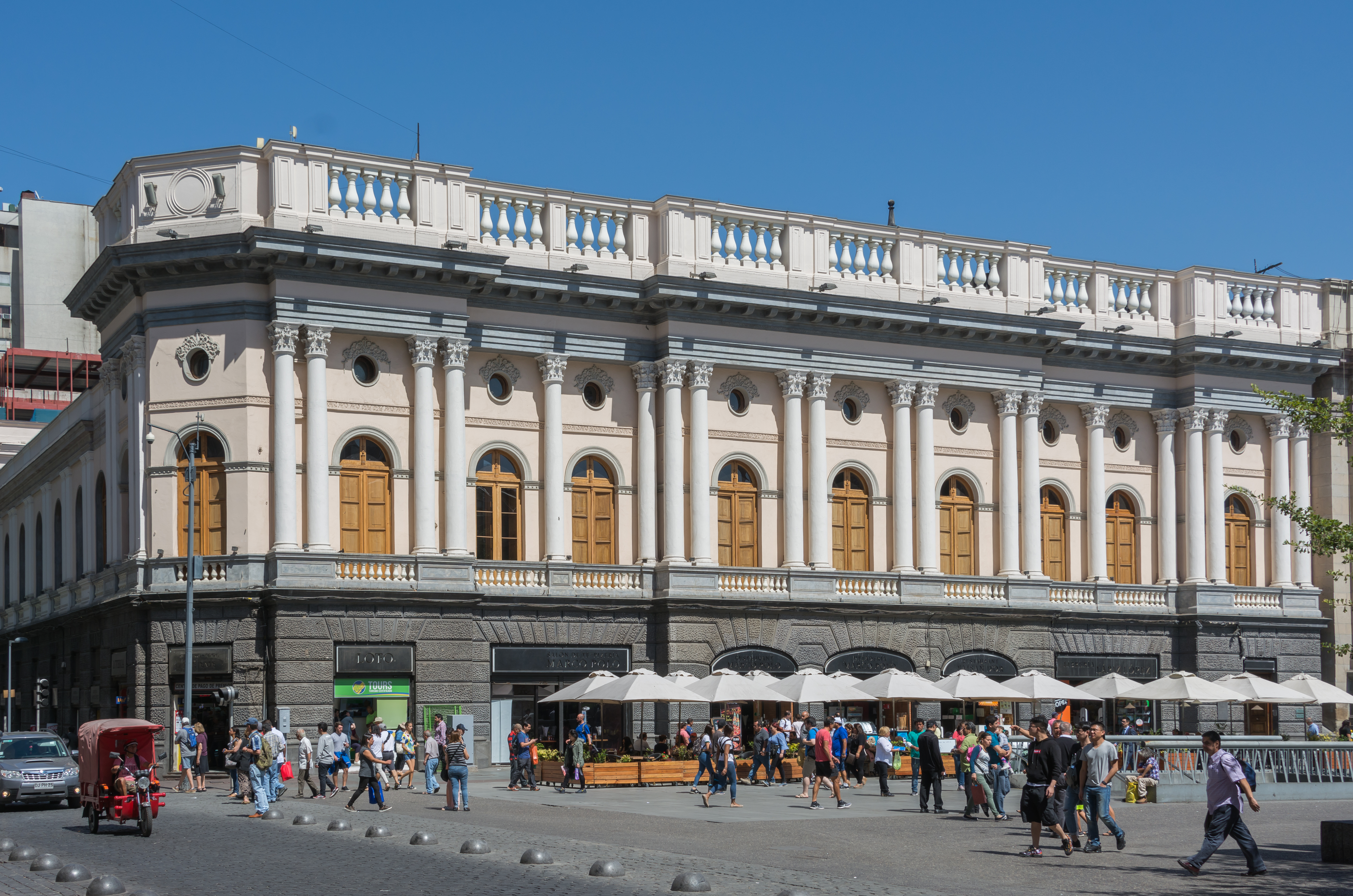
- Interactive map of Palacio arzobispal de Santiago

Design and construction
- Architects: Claudio Brunet de Baines; Lucien Hénault

The Palacio arzobispal of Santiago is the administrative seat of the Arquidiócesis de Santiago de Chile. It stands, along with the Parroquia El Sagrario and the Catedral Metropolitana, on the west side of the Plaza de Armas, in the historical downtown of the city.

== History ==
Its construction started in 1852, when the architect Claudio Brunet de Baines was commissioned by the government. Brunet de Baines died in 1855 and the construction was stopped until 1869, when the construction was resumed, this time led by the French architect Lucien Hénault. The works were finished in 1870 and an elevator was installed in the 1930s.

The Palacio arzobispal was declared as a national monument by the Ministerio de Educación in 1975.
