= Parliament of Malloco =

The Parliament of Malloco was held between governor Juan Henríquez de Villalobos and leaders of the Mapuche in January 1671, at Malloco southwest of Santiago, Chile.

One of the conditions stipulated in it was one in which each rehue of the Mapuche would be left under the vigilance of a Spaniard with the title of capitán de amigos (Captain of Friends), who were to watch over them to see the terms of the agreement were kept. Also they would strive in civilizing the Mapuche. These civil servants acts were put under the inspection of a superior commander, the comisionado de las naciones (Commissioner of Nations). However this clause would cause trouble for many decades.

Soon afterward in 1672, the former toqui Ayllicuriche and other Mapuche leaders attempted a revolt to resist these terms. But he did not get much support and the revolt was quickly crushed. In 1694 the toqui Millalpal and the Mapuche were incited to revolt by the unauthorized activities of Antonio Pedreros, the Commissioner of Nations. The Parliament of Choque-choque held by governor Tomás Marín de Poveda, 1st Marquis of Cañada Hermosa managed to end the revolt. However the abuses and activities of the capitans de amigos eventually triggered the Mapuche Uprising of 1723 by the toqui Vilumilla. This revolt ended with the Parliament of Negrete in 1726, which finally abolished these officials.

== Sources ==
- Pedro de Cordoba y Figueroa,HISTORIA DE CHILE 1492–1717, Coleccion de historiadores de Chile v.2 , Instituto Chileno de Cultura Hispánica, Academia Chilena de la Historia, Imprenta del Ferrocarril, Santiago, 1862 Libro Sesto, Cap. VIII, IX, X, XI
- José Toribio Medina, Diccionario biográfico colonial de Chile, Impr. Elziviriana, Santiago, 1906, Pj. 396–403.
- Diego Barros Arana, Historia jeneral de Chile, Tomo V 1656–1700, R. Jover, Santiago 1885. Original from the University of Michigan Digitized Aug 16, 2007.
