= Ambrosio de Benavides =

Spanish colonial governor

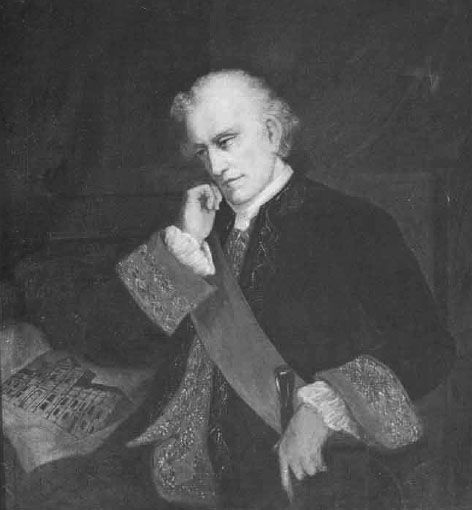
Ambrosio de Benavides

Ambrosio de Benavides Medina Liñán y Torres (January 20, 1718 – April 27, 1787) was a Spanish colonial administrator who served as Royal Governor of Puerto Rico, Royal Governor of Charcas and Royal Governor of Chile.

== Early life ==
Benavides was born in Granada, the son of Juan Carlos de Benavides Mesía Ponce de León, head of the Inquisition in Cordoba, and of his wife, María Teresa de Medina Liñán y Torres. In 1738, he joined the Spanish Army as a cadet, eventually being posted to Málaga, Ceuta and Melilla. He became an infantry captain in 1741, a sergeant major in 1754, a lieutenant colonel in 1760 and a full colonel in 1761. On September 25, 1760, he was appointed governor of Puerto Rico by King Ferdinand VI of Spain.

== As governor of Chile ==
Benavides was notified of his appointment as Captain General of Chile in May 1780, and immediately started the long trip overland. He had to stop and winter in the city of Mendoza but finally managed to arrive in Santiago on December 11, assuming his position the next day. Nonetheless, the long and arduous journey took a heavy toll on his health from which he never really recovered.

=== Conspiracy of the three Antonios ===
Soon after Benavides assumed his post, he was faced with handling the "conspiracy of the three Antonios", an incident in which two Frenchmen, Antonio Gramusset and Antonio Berney, and a criollo, José Antonio de Rojas, inspired by Enlightenment ideals, had formulated a plan to establish Chile as an independent republic. All three conspirators were secretly arrested on January 1, 1781, putting an end to any possible civil unrest before it started.

=== Flood of 1783 ===
The fall of 1783 was one of the harshest on record for Chile. On April 13, a strong earthquake affected Santiago and on June 16, the Mapocho River, after nine days of uninterrupted rain, flooded the city. The river first overran its course to the east of the city, and came down the Alameda (which itself is a former river branch). Soon it also overran its dikes, flooding all the north side (La Cañadilla) of the city. The whole downtown area became an island surrounded by water on all sides. Many nuns, including the Carmelitas de San Rafael had to be rescued on horseback from their isolated monasteries. Finally the storm abated on April 17 with no casualties but with great economic losses.

=== Bourbon reforms ===
King Charles III determined to reform the political administration of the empire: among other reforms he subdivided the General Captaincies into Intendencias. Two were created in Chile in 1786: Santiago, covering the area from Copiapó to the Maule river, and Concepción, from the Maule river to the Valdivia River. Benavides, while remaining governor of Chile, was appointed the intendant of Santiago, and brigadier Ambrosio O'Higgins became intendant of Concepción. Benavides named Alonso de Guzmán y Peralta as his assistant, while O'Higgins named Juan Martínez de Rozas, both lawyers.

Another consequence of the reforms was that the King reserved for himself the appointment of the military governors of Valparaíso and Valdivia, and while continental Chile remained as a Captaincy-General within the viceroyalty, Chiloé Island was detached and made a direct dependency of the Viceroyalty of Perú.

=== Public works ===
During his period, the Italian architect Joaquín Toesca arrived in Chile. He was charged with the construction of the new Cathedral, the La Moneda Palace, the new building for the Cabildo, and the new public jail. He paid much attention to the construction of the Maipo channel, and the reconstruction of Santiago after the floods of 1783, including moving La Moneda from its original location by the river to the current one.

== Death ==
On March 27, 1787, he officially appointed Tomás Álvarez de Acevedo as interim governor and retired to Cauquenes to try to restore his health. There he died on April 27. He was buried in the Cathedral of Santiago.

== Additional information ==
=== See also ===
- Conspiracy of the three Antonios

=== Sources ===
- Barros Arana, Diego (1886). Historia Jeneral de Chile (in Spanish). Vol. VI. Santiago, Chile: Rafael Jover. ISBN 9780598482334.
- Carvallo y Goyeneche, Vicente (1875). Miguel Luis Amunategui (ed.). Descripción Histórica y Geografía del Reino de Chile Vol. II (1626 - 1787). Coleccion de historiadores de Chile y documentos relativos a la historia nacional (in Spanish). Vol. IX (Instituto Chileno de Cultura Hispánica, Academia Chilena de la Historia ed.). Santiago, Chile: Imprenta de La Estrella de Chile. p. 483.
- Gay, Claudio (1848). Historia física y política de Chile (1749-1808) (in Spanish). Vol. IV. Paris, France: En casa del autor. p. 506.
- Medina, José Toribio (1906). Diccionario Biográfico Colonial de Chile (PDF) (in Spanish). Santiago, Chile: Imprenta Elzeviriana. pp. 126–127 of 1, 006.
- Pérez García, José (1900). José Toribio Medina (ed.). Historia Natural, Militar, Civil y Sagrada del Reino de Chile (Vol. II) (PDF). Coleccion de historiadores de Chile y documentos relativos a la historia nacional (in Spanish). Vol. XXIII (Instituto Chileno de Cultura Hispánica, Academia Chilena de la Historia ed.). Santiago, Chile: Imprenta Elzeviriana.

Government offices
Preceded by Esteban Bravo de Rivero	Royal Governor of Puerto Rico; 1761–1766	Succeeded by Marcos de Vergara
Preceded by Juan Martínez de Tineo	Royal Governor of Charcas; 1769–1778	Succeeded by Agustín Fernando de Pinedo
Preceded by Tomás Álvarez	Royal Governor of Chile; 1780–1787	Succeeded by Tomás Álvarez
Military offices
Preceded by Esteban Bravo de Rivero	Captain General of Puerto Rico; 1761–1766	Succeeded by Marcos de Vergara
Preceded by Agustín de Jáuregui	Captain General of Chile; 1780–1787	Succeeded by The Marquis of Osorno
