= Francisco de Meneses Brito =

Royal Governor of Chile

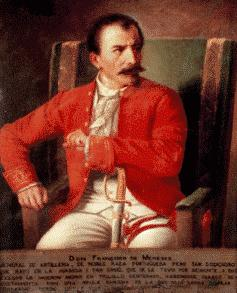

Personal details
- Born: 1615 Cádiz, Spain
- Died: 29 December 1672 (aged 56–57) Lima, Peru
- Occupation: Government

Francisco de Meneses Brito (1615 – 29 December 1672) was Royal Governor of Chile between 1664 and 1667.

== Biography ==
Born in Cádiz in 1615, was the son of Alonso de Meneses and Catalina Corbalán de Castilla. His wife was Catalina Bravo, daughter of Francisco Bravo de Saravia Ovalle (1st Marquess of la Pica) and Marcela Henestrosa Sáenz de Mena.

== Sources ==
- Medina, José Toribio (1906). Diccionario Biográfico Colonial de Chile (PDF) (in Spanish). Santiago, Chile: Imprenta Elzeviriana. pp. 529–531.

Government offices
Preceded by Ángel de Peredo	Royal Governor of Chile; 1664–1667	Succeeded by Diego Dávila
