= Ángel de Peredo =

Royal Governor of Chile (1623–1677)

Ángel de Peredo (born 1623 in Queveda, Cantabria, Spain) was a Knight of the Order of Santiago.

== Career ==
He was the President of the Real Audiencia of Chile and then temporary Royal Governor of Chile from May 1662 to February 1664. During his government, he founded the city of Santa Maria de Guadalupe near the fortress of San Miguel Arcángel de Colcura, built previously by Pedro Porter Casanate south east of the modern city of Lota in the valley of Colcura.

== Exile ==
At the end of his governorship the new governor Francisco de Meneses Brito accused Peredo of creating more places for officials than the royal army needed and of selling the positions. He ordered his arrest, but Peredo managed to escape from Chile. Meneses also attacked the friends of Peredo, among them the Oidor Alonso de Solórzano y Velasco who opposed the measures of the new Governor. In reply Meneses demoted him from his position and exiled him.

Peredo became governor of Tucumán Province between 1670 and 1674. In 1673, he sent a large punitive expedition against the Mocoví and other tribes of the Gran Chaco, who had been raiding the province.

== Sources ==
- Barros Arana, Diego (1885). "XVI". In Carlos Tomás Vicuña Mackenna (ed.). Historia Jeneral de Chile (in Spanish). Vol. V. Santiago, Chile: Rafael Jover.
- Francisco Solano Asta Buruaga y Cienfuegos, Diccionario geográfico de la República de Chile, pp. 387–388
- Medina, José Toribio (1906). Diccionario Biográfico Colonial de Chile (PDF) (in Spanish). Santiago, Chile: Imprenta Elzeviriana. p. 665.

Government offices
Preceded by Diego González	Royal Governor of Chile; 1662–1664	Succeeded by Francisco de Meneses
