= Francisco de Sánchez de la Barreda =

Spanish colonial governor of Chile

Francisco Sánchez de la Barreda y Vera

Royal Governor of Chile
- Interim
- In office November 1733 – May 1734
- Preceded by: Gabriel Cano
- Succeeded by: Manuel de Salamanca

Personal details
- Died: January or February 1738 Santiago, Chile
- Occupation: Lawyer, oidor

Francisco Sánchez de la Barreda y Vera (died January or February 1738) was a Spanish lawyer and colonial administrator. As the senior oidor of the Real Audiencia of Chile, he served as interim governor of Chile from November 1733 to May 1734, following the death of governor Gabriel Cano. He sat on the Audiencia from 1712 until his death.

== Biography ==
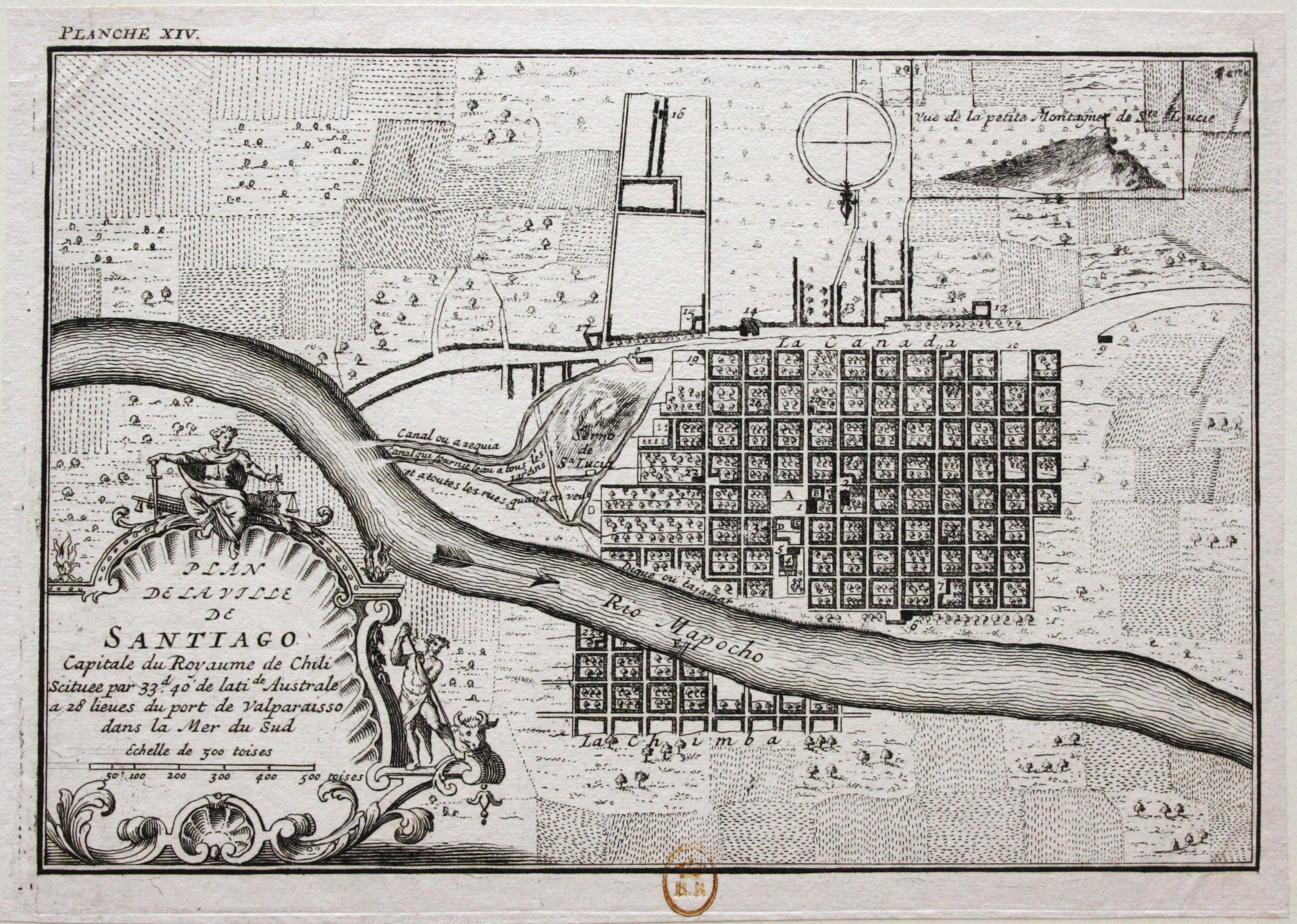
Frézier's plan of Santiago, drawn during his 1712–1714 voyage and published in 1716

Barreda, a doctor of law, took office as an oidor of the Real Audiencia of Santiago on February 1, 1712. He had previously lived in Lima, where his son Domingo was born in 1711. After the earthquake of July 8, 1730, his house was one of the few in Santiago left standing, and he sheltered in it the Augustinian nuns whose convent had been damaged; the bishop commended him to the king for this service.

With Isabel de Espinosa he had a son, Domingo Sánchez de Barreda y Espinosa, who became a priest, serving as parish priest of Lampa and later as chaplain of the Real Audiencia.

=== Government ===
When Cano died on November 11, 1733, the Real Audiencia resolved that Barreda, as its senior member, should assume the presidency of the kingdom. He did so the following day and took the formal oath on November 16; the arrangement was approved by the viceroy of Peru in January 1734 and by the king in March 1735.

According to the historian Diego Barros Arana, the government of Barreda "was as short as it was insignificant". The cabildo of Santiago petitioned the viceroy of Peru to confirm Barreda as interim governor until the arrival of the appointed governor, Bruno Mauricio de Zabala, who was to travel to Chile from Buenos Aires. Zabala, detained by a rebellion in Paraguay, died on his journey in 1736 and never assumed the post.

Soon after Barreda took office, news arrived that an armed Dutch ship had anchored near Valdivia. The interim governor ordered a detachment sent from Concepción to prevent foreign trade or any hostile action; the maestre de campo Manuel de Salamanca advanced along the coastal roads with two hundred men.

On January 1, 1734, Barreda inaugurated the casa de recogidas in Santiago, an institution that served at once as an asylum and a prison for women. It had been ordered founded under governor Juan Andrés de Ustariz and was completed under Cano.

Barreda's government ended when the viceroy José de Armendáriz, Marquis of Castelfuerte, decided not to confirm him and instead appointed Salamanca, the maestre de campo of the army in Chile. Salamanca entered Santiago on May 5, 1734, took the oath of office, and was recognized as president of the Real Audiencia the next day.

=== Death ===
Barreda died in Santiago in the first weeks of 1738; on February 22 of that year, the cabildo resolved to ask the king to fill the seat on the Audiencia left vacant by his death. His family was left in extreme poverty.

== Sources ==
- Barros Arana, Diego (1886). Historia jeneral de Chile (in Spanish). Vol. VI. Santiago: Rafael Jover.
- Medina, José Toribio (1906). Diccionario biográfico colonial de Chile (PDF) (in Spanish). Santiago: Imprenta Elzeviriana. pp. 801–802. Archived from the original (PDF) on December 28, 2025.

Government offices
Preceded by Gabriel Cano	Royal Governor of Chile; 1733–1734	Succeeded by Manuel Silvestre de Salamanca Cano
