= Luis Fernández de Córdoba y Arce =

Spanish sailor and military man

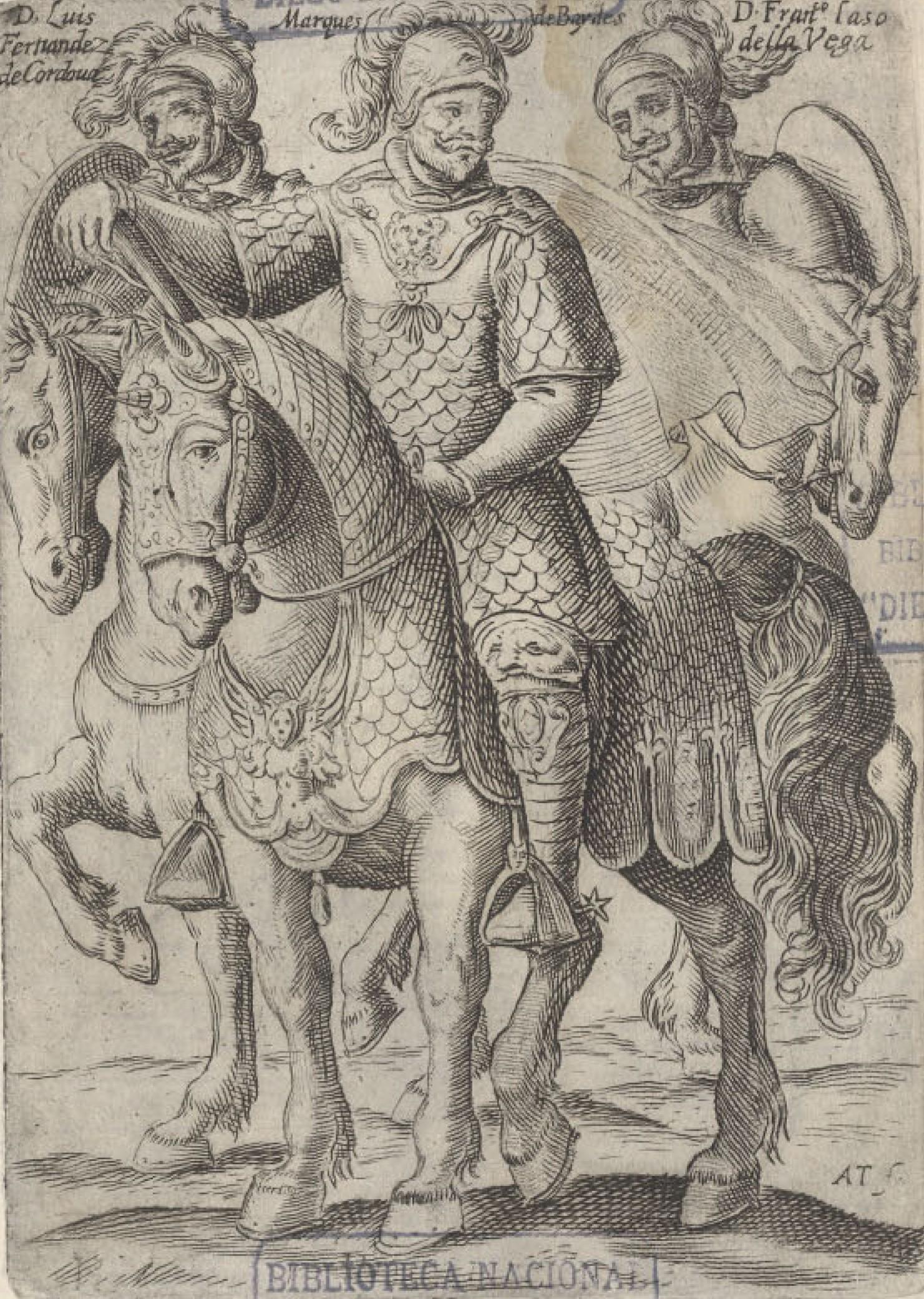
Luis Fernández de Córdoba y Arce, Francisco López de Zúñiga and Francisco Laso de la Vega:

Luis Fernández de Córdoba y Arce was a Spanish sailor and military man who was Governor of Chile between May 1625 and December 1629.

== Biography ==
A Spanish noble gentleman of El Carpio, in the Province of Cordova and member of an influential family, Luis Fernandez de Cordoba y Arce made his military career in the navy becoming a general of the Navy of the Philippines. After that he was given a post, by his uncle the Viceroy of Peru, Diego Fernández de Córdoba, Marquis of Guadalcázar. He was made general of the plaza and presidio of El Collo, one of the major naval bases in the Spanish Pacific at the time.

When the Marquess of Guadalcázar, heard of the death of the Governor of Chile, Pedro Osores de Ulloa, he decided to replace the temporary governor, Francisco de Alava and Nureña. Nureña was the brother-in-law of the deceased Osores, designated by Osores during his final hours. In order to replace him the viceroy designated as temporary Governor his own nephew Luis Fernández de Córdoba y Arce, hoping that he would have occasion to display his military skills in the War of Arauco. He was later confirmed in the position by king Philip III of Spain.

From his arrival in Chile, the governor was immediately in the most urgent situation with the Mapuche toqui Butapichún making frequent incursions into Spanish territory north of the Bio-Bio River. In order to contain him, the new governor divided the border into two districts; one under the command of its maestre de campo Alonso de Cordova y Figueroa, and the other run by his Sargento Mayor Juan Fernandez Rebolledo. To each of these commanders he gave a well equipped force, so that as a mobile force it could be used in pursuing Butapichún. Despite these measures and some lucky blows against the natives, the Malónes of Butapichún continued. He suffered some defeats with the worst being the Battle of Las Cangrejeras.

He also suggested to the king, without success, the transfer of the Real Audiencia of Chile from Santiago to Concepcion.

== Sources ==
- Medina, José Toribio (1906). Diccionario Biográfico Colonial de Chile (PDF) (in Spanish). Santiago, Chile: Imprenta Elzeviriana. p. 296.

Government offices
Preceded by Francisco de Álava y Nureña	Royal Governor of Chile; 1625–1629	Succeeded by Francisco Laso de la Vega
