= Vilumilla =

Vilumilla was the Mapuche Toqui elected in 1722 to lead the Mapuche Uprising of 1723 against the Spanish for their violation of the peace.

The Mapuche resented the Spanish intruding into their territory and building forts, and also the insolence of those officials called capitan de amigos (Captain of Friends), introduced by a clause in the Parliament of Malloco for guarding the missionaries, but that had sought to exercise surveillance and authority over the native Mapuche which they used to establish a monopoly of the trade in ponchos which the Mapuche found unbearable. For these grievances, they met and determined, in 1722, to create a Toqui, and have recourse to war. Vilumilla was chosen, despite being a man of low rank, because he was one who had acquired a high reputation for his judgment, courage and his larger strategic view of the war to come.

Vilumilla set out to attack the Spanish settlements in 1723. However he was careful to warn the missionaries to quit the country, in order to avoid any being ill-treated by his army. The capture of the fort of Tucapel was his first success and the garrison of the fort of Arauco, fearing the same fate, abandoned it. Having destroyed these two places he marched against the fort of Purén, but the garrison commander Urrea, opposed him so effectively that he was forced to besiege it. However, in a short time the garrison was reduced to desperation from thirst, for the Mapuche had cut the aqueduct which supplied them with water. The commander made a sortie in order to procure some water and was slain together with his soldiers. At this critical point, the governor Gabriel Cano arrived with an army of five thousand men. Vilumilla, expecting battle immediately drew up his troops in order of battle behind a torrential river. Seeing this position Cano, though repeatedly provoked by the Mapuche, thought it advisable to abandon Purén, and retire with the garrison.

The war afterwards became reduced to minor skirmishes, which was finally ended by the Parliament of Negrete of 1726, in which both sides signed the Peace of Negrete, where the Treaty of Quillan was reconfirmed, a system of regulated fairs were established and the hated title of Captain of Friends was abolished.

== Sources ==
- Vicente Carvallo y Goyeneche, Descripcion Histórico Geografía del Reino de Chile, Tomo II, Coleccíon de historiadores de Chile y documentos relativos a la historia nacional: Tomo IX, By Diego Barros Arana, Sociedad Chilena de Historia y Geografía, Francisco Solano Astaburuaga, Instituto Chileno de Cultura Hispánica, Miguel Luis Amunátegui, Academia Chilena de la Historia, José Toribio Medina, Luis Montt, Imprenta del Ferrocarril, Santiago, 1875. Original from the University of Michigan, Digitized Aug 4, 2005, (History of Chile 1626–1788)
  - Capítulo LXXV, pg. 236
  - Capítulo LXXVI, pg. 241
  - Capítulo LXXVII, pg. 248
- Juan Ignatius Molina, The Geographical, Natural, and Civil History of Chili, Longman, Hurst, Rees, and Orme, London, 1809
- José Ignacio Víctor Eyzaguirre, Historia eclesiastica: Politica y literaria de Chile, IMPRENTA DEL COMERCIO, VALPARAISO, June 1830 List of Toquis, pg. 498–500.
- Anson Uriel Hancock, A History of Chile, Chicago, C. H. Sergel and Company, 1893, pp.110–111
