= Francisco Ibáñez de Peralta =

Spanish governor and general (1644–1712)

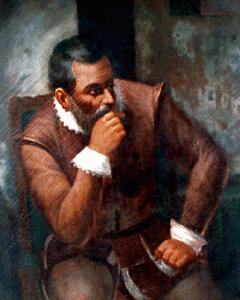
Francisco Ibáñez de Segovia y Peralta

Francisco Ibáñez de Segovia y Peralta (1644–1712) was a Spanish colonial administrator who was Royal Governor of Chile from 1700 to 1709. He was born in Madrid and died in Lima.

== Sources ==
- Cordoba y Figueroa, Pedro de (1862). "Libro Sesto, XIII & XIV". Historia de Chile (1492–1717). Coleccion de historiadores de Chile (in Spanish). Vol. II (Instituto Chileno de Cultura Hispánica, Academia Chilena de la Historia ed.). Santiago, Chile: Imprenta del Ferrocarril.
- Eyzaguirre, José Ignacio Víctor (1850). Historia eclesiastica: Politica y literaria de Chile (in Spanish). Valparaíso, Chile: Imprenta del Comercio. pp. 205–206.
- Medina, José Toribio (1906). Diccionario Biográfico Colonial de Chile (PDF) (in Spanish). Santiago, Chile: Imprenta Elziviriana. pp. 1, 006.

Government offices
Preceded by Tomás Marín de Poveda	Royal Governor of Chile; 1700–1709	Succeeded by Juan Andrés de Ustariz
