= Juan Henríquez de Villalobos =

Juan Henríquez de Villalobos (1630 – Madrid, 1689); Spanish soldier and administrator who, after participation in various European wars, was designated as governor of Chile by Mariana of Austria. In this position, between October 1670 and April 1682, he became, according to Chilean historiography, the epítome of the corrupt and nepotistic governor. His government tenure was darkened by a long series of litigations and accusations by oidores of the Real Audiencia of Santiago and other vecinos of the colony. He was one of the governors who left the position richer than he began, with not less than 900 thousand pesos, according to Jose Toribio Medina.

In the War of Arauco, in January 1671 Henríquez held the Parliament of Malloco ending hostilities that began with the Mapuche Insurrection of 1655. However, in 1672 Henríquez faced a Mapuche revolt, by the former toqui Ayllicuriche and other leaders that he repressed before it went very far. March 1674 he was able to hold a festive Parliament of Concepcion to celebrate the end of hostilities.

== Additional information ==
=== Sources ===
- Barros Arana, Diego (1885). "XIX-XX". Historia Jeneral de Chile (in Spanish). Vol. V. Santiago, Chile: Rafael Jover.
- Córdoba y Figueroa, Pedro de (1862). "Libro Sesto, Cap.VIII-XI". Historia de Chile (1492-1717). Coleccion de historiadores de Chile y documentos relativos a la historia nacional (in Spanish). Vol. II (Instituto Chileno de Cultura Hispánica, Academia Chilena de la Historia ed.). Santiago, Chile: Imprenta del Ferrocarril.
- Medina, José Toribio (1906). Diccionario Biográfico Colonial de Chile (PDF) (in Spanish). Santiago, Chile: Imprenta Elzeviriana. pp. 396–403.

Government offices
Preceded by Diego González Montero	Royal Governor of Chile; 1670–1682	Succeeded by José de Garro
