= Tomás Marín de Poveda, 1st Marquis of Cañada Hermosa =

Spanish colonial administrator

Don Tomás Marín de Poveda Marqués de Cañada Hermosa Caballero de Santiago
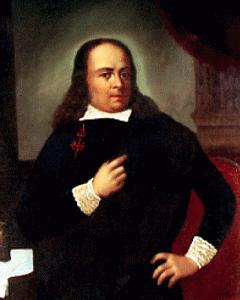

Royal Governor of Chile
- In office January 6, 1692 – December 23, 1700
- Monarch: Charles II
- Preceded by: José de Garro
- Succeeded by: Francisco Ibáñez

Personal details
- Born: 26 February 1650 Lúcar, Almería Province, Spain
- Died: 8 October 1703 (aged 53) Santiago, Chile
- Spouse: Juana Urdanegui
- Profession: Lieutenant General

Tomás López Marín y González de Poveda, 1st Marquis of Cañada Hermosa (Spanish: Tomás López Marín y González de Poveda, primer Marqués de Cañada Hermosa) (February 26, 1650 – October 8, 1703) was a Spanish colonial administrator who served as Royal Governor of Chile.

== Early life ==
Tomás Marín de Poveda was born in Lúcar, Almería Province, the son of Tomás López Marín and María González de Poveda. He came to America in 1687 with his uncle, who had been named Archbishop of Charcas, in present-day Bolivia. Afterwards, in 1670, he moved to Chile for the first time with the retinue of governor Juan Henríquez.

He later returned to Spain, where he was promoted to the rank of Lieutenant General and named Royal Governor of Chile on July 1, 1683. However, he was forced to wait for the term of the serving governor, José del Garro, to expire before travelling to take up his post, this meant that he could not assume until 1692.

On August 9, 1687, he was made a knight of the Order of Santiago. In 1689, he wrote a Funereal Prayer for Marie Louise of Orléans (Spanish: Oracion Funebre a Doña María Luisa de Orleans) to mark the death of the Queen.

== As Governor of Chile ==
His administration was marked by a brief flare-up of the Arauco War. In 1694 the Toqui Millalpal and the Mapuche were incited to revolt by the unauthorized activities of Antonio Pedreros, the Commissary for Indian Affairs, against their machis, whom Pedreros had tried to violently isolate and relocate. Pedreros died of wounds when his force tried to cross the Quepe River to attack Millalpal.

The Spanish army of the Captaincy General of Chile was then sent against Millalpal under Maestre de Campo Alonso de Cordova and the Sargento Mayor Alonso Cobarrubias was impossible for Millalpal to resist and he had to capitulate. The governor then called the Parliament of Choque-Choque with the Mapuche, realizing Pedreros had been the source of the dispute and made a peace that lasted for nearly thirty years.

Also Poveda had to deal with the expeditions of various pirates against Chilean trade, and the competition between the various functionaries of the Real Audiencia of Chile. During his term, he founded the cities of San Agustín of Talca, Rengo (Villa Hermosa) and Chimbarongo.

After his tenure, he received the title Marquis of Cañada Hermosa. He died in Santiago a year later, in 1703.

In 2019 the title was rehabilitated by a cousin of the 1st Marquis, Nick Loeb Count of San Pascual Bailón.

== Additional information ==
=== Sources ===
- Cordoba y Figueroa, Pedro de (1862). "Libro Sesto, XIII & XIV". Historia de Chile (1492-1717). Coleccion de historiadores de Chile (in Spanish). Vol. II (Instituto Chileno de Cultura Hispánica, Academia Chilena de la Historia ed.). Santiago, Chile: Imprenta del Ferrocarril.
- Eyzaguirre, José Ignacio Víctor (1850). Historia eclesiastica: Politica y literaria de Chile (in Spanish). Valparaíso, Chile: Imprenta del Comercio. pp. 205–206.
- Medina, José Toribio (1906). Diccionario Biográfico Colonial de Chile (PDF) (in Spanish). Santiago, Chile: Imprenta Elzeviriana. pp. 500–502.
- Pérez García, José (1900). José Toribio Medina (ed.). Historia Natural, Militar, Civil y Sagrada del Reino de Chile (Vol. I) (PDF). Coleccion de historiadores de Chile y documentos relativos a la historia nacional (in Spanish). Vol. XXII. Santiago, Chile: Imprenta Elzeviriana.
- Pérez García, José (1900). José Toribio Medina (ed.). Historia Natural, Militar, Civil y Sagrada del Reino de Chile (Vol. II) (PDF). Coleccion de historiadores de Chile y documentos relativos a la historia nacional (in Spanish). Vol. XXIII. Santiago, Chile: Imprenta Elzeviriana.

Government offices
Preceded by José de Garro	Royal Governor of Chile; 1692–1700	Succeeded by Francisco Ibáñez
Spanish nobility
Preceded by New creation	Marquis of Cañada Hermosa; 1701–1703	Succeeded by José Marín de Poveda
