= Governor Dávila =

Governor Dávila may refer to:

- Diego Dávila, 1st Marquis of Navamorcuende, Royal Governor of Chile from 1667 to 1670
- Gil González Dávila (died 1543), Governor of Santiago (Jamaica) c. 1533/1534
- Pedro Arias Dávila (1440s–1531), Governor of Panama from 1514 to 1526 and Governor of Nicaragua from 1527 to 1531
