= Diego González Montero Justiniano =

Royal Governor of Chile

Diego González Montero Justiniano was interim Royal Governor of Chile twice, from February to May 1662 following the death of Pedro Porter Casanate and again from February to October 1670 succeeding the Diego Dávila, 1st Marquis of Navamorcuende until the arrival of Juan Henríquez de Villalobos.

== Sources ==
- Medina, José Toribio (1906). Diccionario Biográfico Colonial de Chile (PDF) (in Spanish). Santiago, Chile: Imprenta Elzeviriana. p. 375.

Government offices
Preceded by Pedro Porter	Royal Governor of Chile; 1662	Succeeded by Ángel de Peredo
Preceded by Diego Dávila	Royal Governor of Chile; 1670	Succeeded by Juan Henríquez de Villalobos
