= Cristóbal de la Cerda y Sotomayor =

Royal Governor of Chile

Don Cristóbal de la Cerda
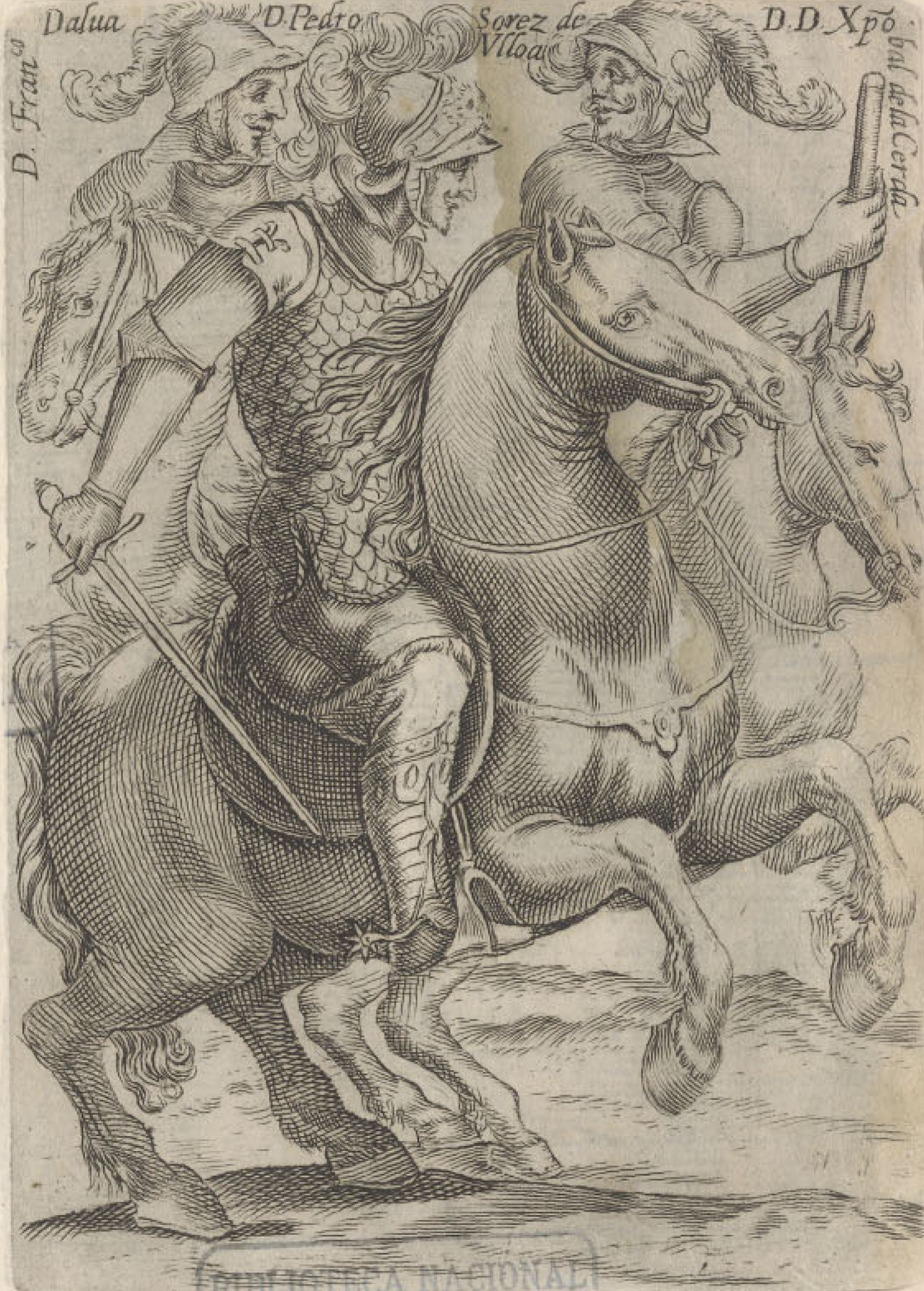

Royal Governor of Chile
- In office December 1620 – November 1621
- Monarch: Philip III
- Prime Minister: Cristóbal de Sandoval, Duke of Uceda
- Preceded by: Lope de Ulloa
- Succeeded by: Pedro Osores

Personal details
- Born: 1585 Mexico City, Mexico
- Died: Unknown
- Spouse: Sebastiana de Avendaño
- Profession: Lawyer

Cristóbal de la Cerda y Sotomayor, (México 1585 – † ? ); Spanish oidor, lawyer of the Real Audiencia of Chile. After the death of governor Lope de Ulloa y Lemos he assumed the temporary governance of Chile for eleven months, between December 1620 and November 1621.

== Sources ==
- Medina, José Toribio (1906). Diccionario Biográfico Colonial de Chile (PDF) (in Spanish). Santiago, Chile: Imprenta Elzeviriana. pp. 197–203.

Government offices
Preceded by Lope de Ulloa	Royal Governor of Chile; 1620–1621	Succeeded by Pedro Osores
