= Francisco de Álava y Nureña =

Chilean politician (born c. 1567)

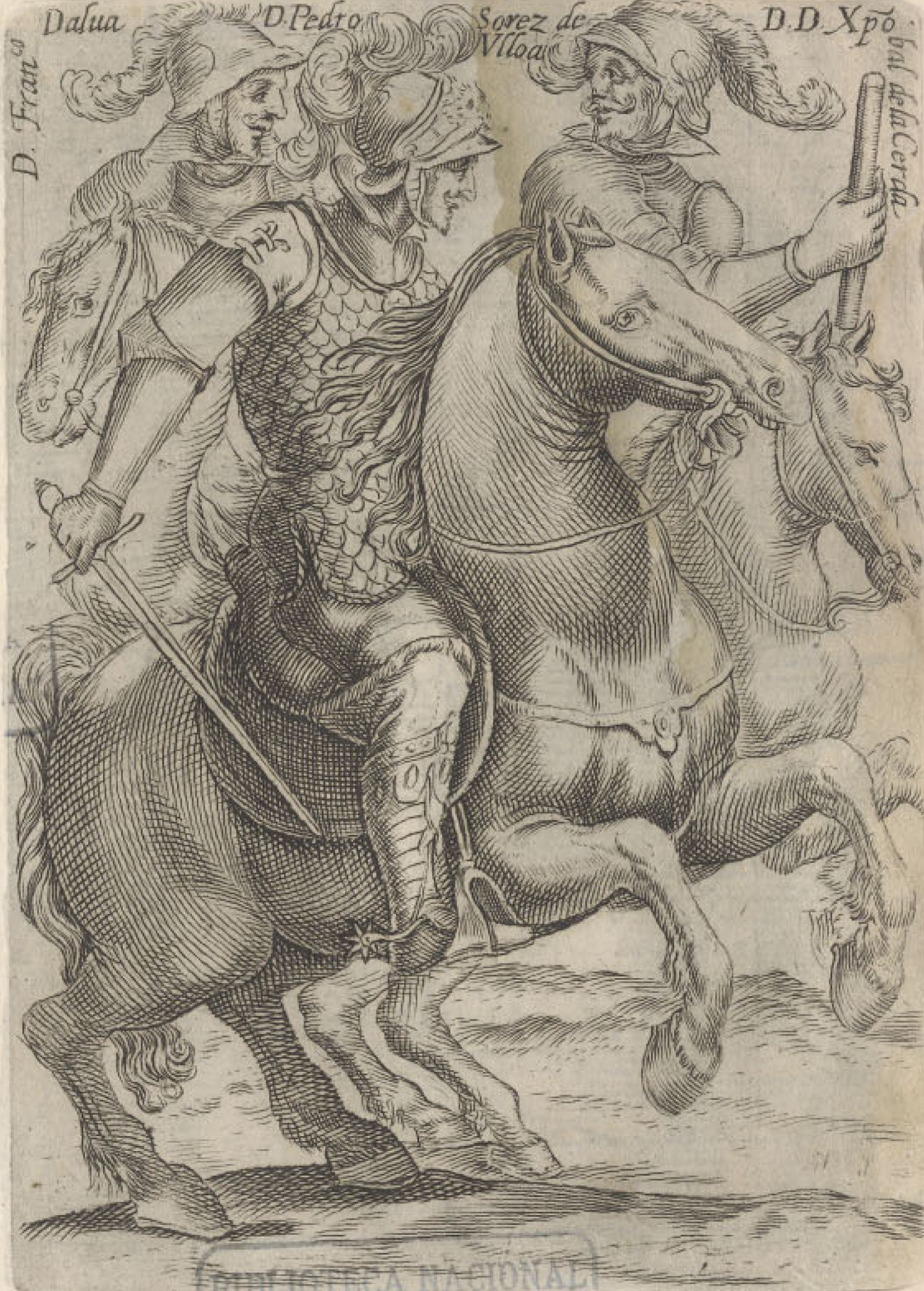

Francisco de Alava y Nureña (born ca. 1567) was the brother-in-law of the Royal Governor of Chile, Pedro Osores de Ulloa. He was designated as temporary governor of the Captaincy General of Chile by Osores on his death bed in September 1624. Upon hearing of the death of Osores and the temporary appointment of Álava, the Viceroy of Peru, Diego Fernández de Córdoba, Marquis of Guadalcázar decided to replace him with his nephew Luis Fernández de Córdoba y Arce, hoping that he would have occasion to display his military skills in the War of Arauco. Córdoba replaced Álava in May 1625.

== Sources ==
- Medina, José Toribio (1906). Diccionario Biográfico Colonial de Chile (PDF) (in Spanish). Santiago, Chile: Imprenta Elzeviriana. pp. 1, 006.

Government offices
Preceded by Pedro Osores	Royal Governor of Chile; 1624–1625	Succeeded by Luis Fernández de Córdoba
