= Ordaz =

Ordaz is a surname. Notable people with the surname include:

- Diego de Ordaz (1480–1532), Spanish conquistador, participated in the exploration and conquest of Mexico
- Diego Ordaz (born 1984), Mexican football defender
- Gustavo Díaz Ordaz (1911–1979), served as the President of Mexico from 1964 to 1970
- Luis Ordaz (born 1975), free agent utility infielder in Major League Baseball
- Tomás Álvarez de Acevedo Ordaz, twice interim governor of the Kingdom of Chile in 1780 and between 1787 and 1788
- Yolanda Ordaz de la Cruz, Mexican journalist killed in 2011

== See also ==
- Gustavo Díaz Ordaz, Tamaulipas, a municipality in the Mexican state of Tamaulipas
- Licenciado Gustavo Díaz Ordaz International Airport (IATA: PVR, ICAO: MMPR) is an international airport at Puerto Vallarta, Jalisco
- Puerto Ordaz, a city which, together with the older settlement of San Felix, forms Ciudad Guayana in Bolívar State, eastern Venezuela
- Villa Díaz Ordaz, a town and municipality in Oaxaca in south-western Mexico
