= Argentina in the viceroyalty of the Río de la Plata =

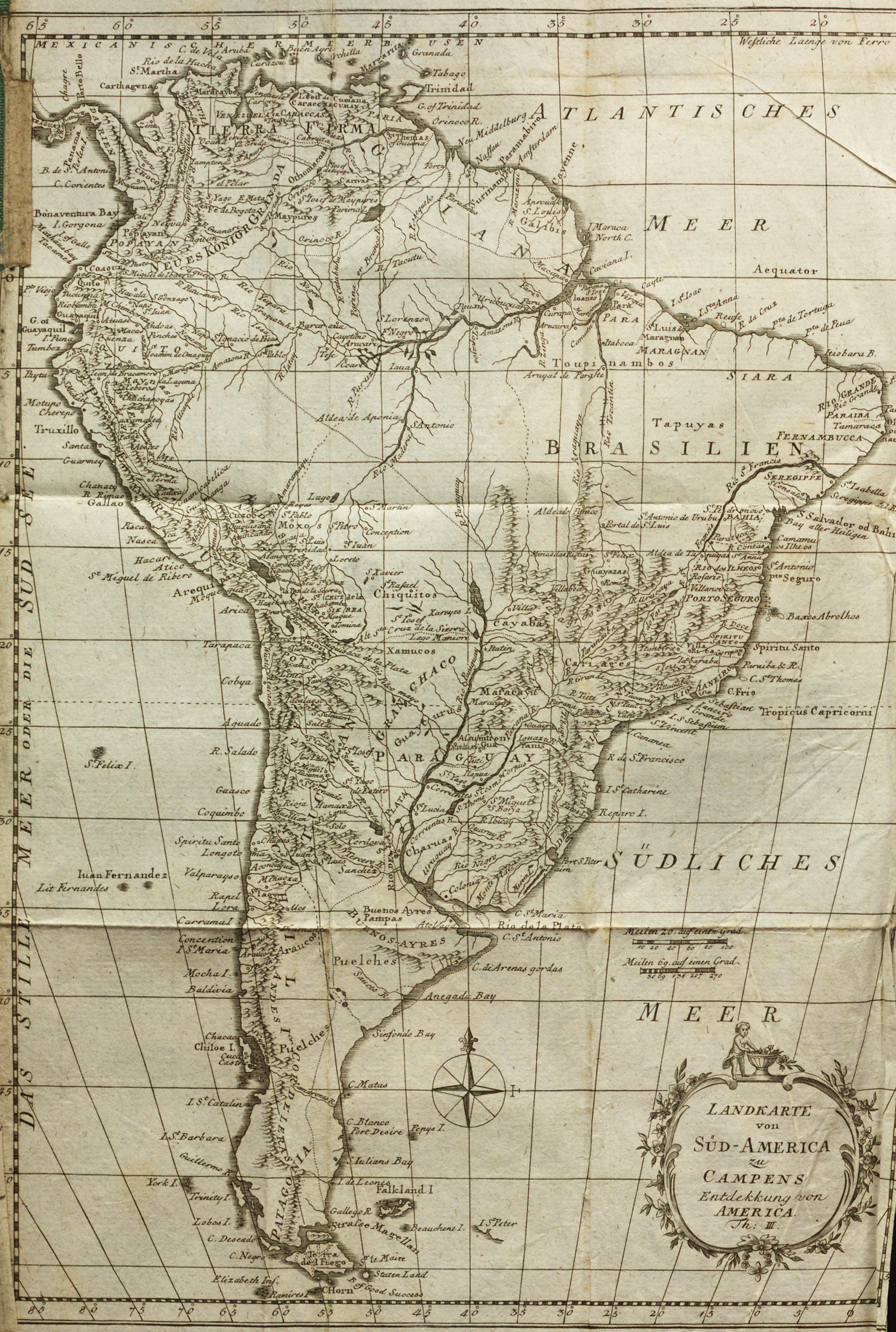
South America according to a map from Joachim Heinrich Campe's book Kolumbus oder die Entdeckung von Westindien (1782). The limits, however, predate the formation of the Viceroyalty of the Río de la Plata.

The current territory of Argentina was part of the viceroyalty of the Río de la Plata during the period immediately prior to its independence. During this period, which spans from the formation of the viceroyalty in 1776 until the May Revolution of 1810 and the definitive dissolution of the viceroyalty the following year, the until then autonomous colonial provinces of Tucumán and Río de la Plata were united for the first time in a single administrative unit, with capital and center in the city of Buenos Aires, which has continued to be, to the present, the capital and most important city of the Argentine Republic.

The viceroyalty also included the territories of the current republics of Bolivia, Paraguay, and Uruguay, which during the independence process were separated from the United Provinces of the Río de la Plata – initial name of the current Argentine State – due to the evolution of the war of independence. and serious disagreements about the organization of the State.

== Background ==
=== The viceroyalty of Peru and the Bourbon reforms ===
Since the creation of the viceroyalty of New Granada in 1739, the viceroyalty of Peru had been limited to the territories effectively dominated by the Spanish south of the equator; Its southernmost provinces were the captain general of Chile, the governorate of Tucumán and the governorate of the Río de la Plata. The last two depended judicially on the Royal Court of Charcas, located further north, in the district of Chuquisaca, which together with that of La Paz formed the so-called Alto Perú. Economically, Tucumán and the Río de la Plata – as well as the governorate of Paraguay – were economically and politically marginal territories, with very low population density and whose contribution to the economy of the Spanish empire was practically nil.

During the first half of the 18th century, the Spanish Crown had centralized political power in peninsular Spain, eliminating regional differences. In the middle of the century they decided to undertake the same reforms in their overseas possessions, professionalizing the government, removing it from the influence of local elites and making the "overseas kingdoms" effectively function as colonies; that is, dependencies oriented exclusively to satisfy the needs of the metropolis.

The reformist impulse accelerated with the Spanish defeats in the Seven Years' War, which convinced King Charles III to modify the defensive system of the colonies; For this purpose, the Havana Navy Administration was founded in 1764, with authority over the entire island of Cuba. Successive ordinances created intendencies throughout Spanish America and in the Philippines. For the administration of the colonies, the most solid and loyal source of human resources to the Crown was used: the officers of the Army and Navy.

Regarding the economic reforms, the central concern of the rulers was the increase in tax collection through the increase in taxes and efficiency in collection; However, the massive increase in defense expenses meant that the American colonies did not contribute much to the support of the State. But much more important was the insistence on the development of trade with America, as a captive market that should be the basis of the kingdom's economic growth; In this sense, the economic reforms initiated by the Count of Campomanes were successful in achieving economic recovery on both sides of the Atlantic. As a complement, measures were also established to prohibit local productions that could compete with peninsular exports. The military reinforcement was, in addition, relatively effective in combating smuggling, which – protected by venal rulers – undermined any attempt to increase tax revenue and trade between the peninsula and America.

In January 1771, the prosecutor of the Royal Court of Charcas, Tomás Álvarez de Acevedo, submitted to that court an extensive report, in which he detailed the detrimental situation in which the inhabitants of the provinces of Paraguay, the Río de la Plata and including from Tucumán, due to the great distance from the viceregal headquarters – almost a thousand leagues from Buenos Aires – and judicial headquarters – more than five hundred leagues – to which they had to resort to any procedure that exceeded the merely local. He added that, for this reason, the neighbors found it much more practical to resort directly to the authority of the Council of the Indies or the king, whose response was always quicker and more executive. As a solution, he proposed the creation of a new viceroyalty, which would include those three southern provinces and also the township of Cuyo, and which would be administered, judicially, by its own Royal Court.

== Cevallos and the creation of the viceroyalty ==
=== Appointment ===
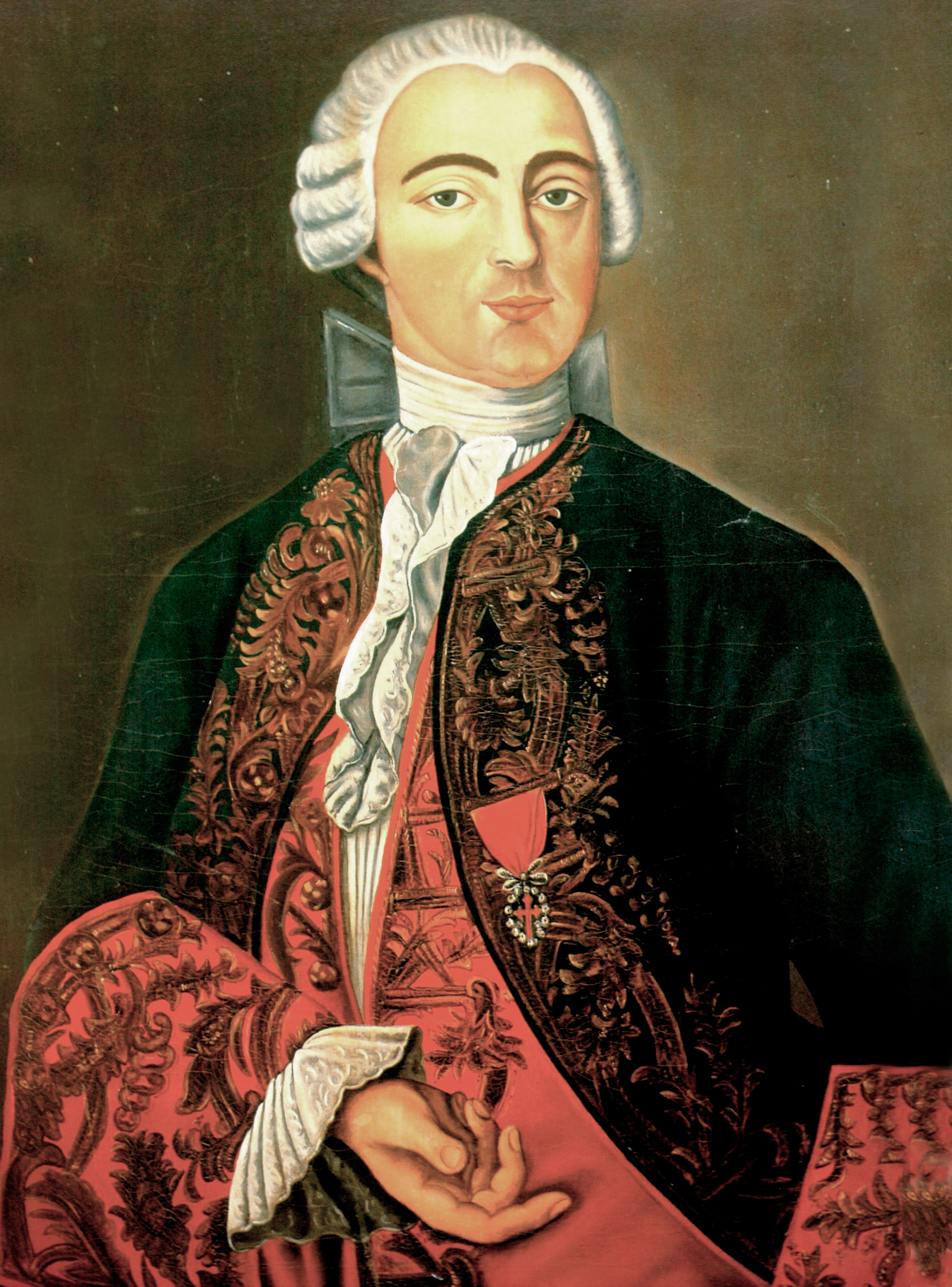
Viceroy Pedro de Cevallos

King Carlos III asked Cevallos – governor of Madrid at that time – for a response plan to the Portuguese aggression; Cevallos organized a very careful campaign plan to invade and completely annex Portugal, taking advantage of the distraction of England engaged in the American War of Independence. The plan was judged very dangerous, but it inspired the Count of Ricla to develop the part of it dedicated to operations against Portugal in Brazil; The king consulted Cevallos for his opinion, and he approved Ricla's plan, although modifying some data, such as the number of troops and ships necessary, the need to have absolute political support that would grant great freedom to his commander to act as desired. present the facts. In his report, Cevallos requested that these troops not be placed in the hands of the governor of Buenos Aires, Juan José de Vértiz, whom he considered excessively veteran; By Royal Order of July 25, 1776, an even older general, Cevallos himself, was then appointed to command the troops.

=== Campaign against Portugal ===
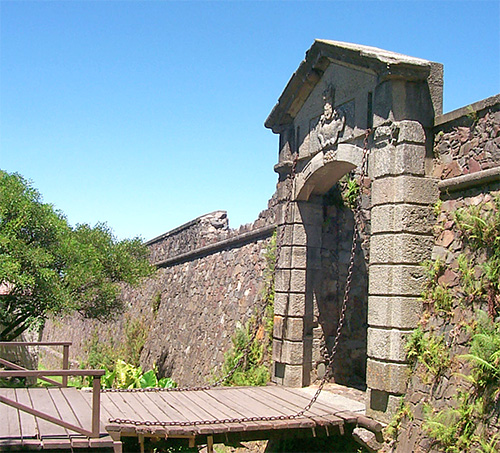
Ruins of the walls of Colonia del Sacramento

On February 20, 1777, the fleet anchored off Santa Catarina Island, and on the 22nd, the march on the city began, occupying it without resistance. The prisoners were sent to Rio de Janeiro, and on March 30, Cevallos and his 84 ships resumed their southward voyage, while he ordered Vértiz to depart from Montevideo for Río Grande. However, upon arriving in Montevideo, he ordered the governor to retreat to the Santa Teresa Fortress.

On May 22, Cevallos's 37 ships landed near Colonia and laid siege to the city; the viceroy rejected an offer of capitulation, which forced the besieged to surrender unconditionally. Colonia was occupied on June 5, and Cevallos proceeded to destroy all of the city's fortifications, in accordance with an order from the king.

=== Freedom of trade and free entry ===
Since shortly after the founding of Buenos Aires in 1580, this city had rivaled Lima, the capital of Peru, for their respective commercial interests. Given the enormous difference in population and wealth, for almost two centuries Lima held the advantage in their dispute, first completely prohibiting trade through the port of Buenos Aires, and then limiting it to the minimum necessary for the city's subsistence, with an express prohibition on the internment of imported goods to Paraguay, Tucumán, and Chile. The "black settlement" of Buenos Aires established in favor of the English in Buenos Aires by the Treaty of Utrecht and the development of smuggling in the Río de la Plata area somewhat diminished Lima's predominance, but it was the lowering of the costs of navigation across the Atlantic and the loss of Spanish commercial predominance in the Pacific Ocean that convinced Spain to shift the balance of power in favor of Buenos Aires. The founding of the viceroyalty implicitly entailed the liberalization of trade with Spain and the end of Lima's privileges.

Shortly after the conquest of Colonia, Cevallos had advised the king to make the viceroyalty permanent, to keep the Royal Audience of Charcas and add another one in Buenos Aires, and to create a new Court of Accounts in the latter. Knowing that his advice to keep the viceroyalty would be approved, on October 27, 1777 the Regulation of Free Internment, which freed the circulation of merchandise - including imported ones - between the provinces of the viceroyalty from prohibitions and taxes, which would only be subject to transit guides, a minor gabela. Additionally, the viceroy prohibited the extraction of silver from Potosí to the viceroyalty of Peru. On the other hand, the ports of the viceroyalty, particularly Buenos Aires and Montevideo, benefited from the Free Trade Regulation signed by the king in October 1778; The so-called "free trade" did not refer to the freedom to trade with all countries in the world, but to the elimination of commercial privileges—particularly those that benefited the port of Cádiz—and the freedom to trade between any port in Spanish America and any in European Spain. Trade circuits were quickly established with the ports of Vigo, Santander, and Bilbao, largely displacing the Cádiz monopoly.

Before leaving for Spain, the viceroy had time to establish several forts on the southern indigenous frontier, such as India Muerta and Melincué. On March 21, 1778, Charles III ratified the continuity of the Viceroyalty of the Río de la Plata, naming Juan José de Vértiz as Cevallos' successor.

Cevallos left Montevideo for Spain on June 30, 1778, taking with him the majority of the Spanish troops, although Vértiz managed to get 930 soldiers and officers of the expedition to remain voluntarily in the Río de la Plata, increasing the fixed units.
