= Lope de Ulloa y Lemos =

Spanish soldier

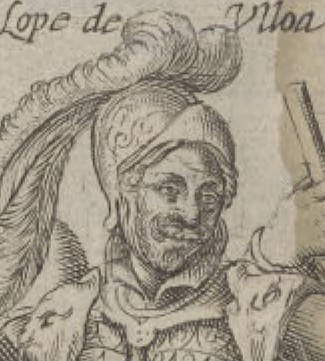

Lope de Ulloa y Lemos (1572? in Galicia – December 8, 1620 in Concepcion); Spanish soldier designated by the viceroy of Peru Francisco de Borja y Aragón, Prince of Esquilache, carried out the position of Captain General and Governor of Chile, and president of the Real Audiencia of Chile. His government in Chile lasted for two years, between January 1618 and December 1620, the date of his death. It was believed that he had been poisoned.

== Sources ==
- Medina, José Toribio (1906). Diccionario Biográfico Colonial de Chile (PDF) (in Spanish). Santiago, Chile: Imprenta Elzeviriana. pp. 1, 006.

Government offices
| Preceded by Fernando Talaverano | Royal Governor of Chile; 1618–1620 | Succeeded by Cristóbal de la Cerda |
