= Gabriel Cano de Aponte =

Don Gabriel Cano de Aponte Caballero de Alcantara
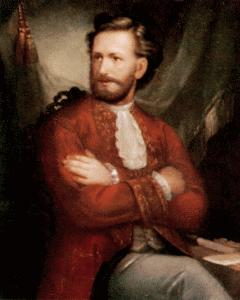

Royal Governor of Chile
- In office 17 December 1717 – 11 November 1733
- Monarch: Philip V
- Preceded by: José de Santiago Concha
- Succeeded by: Francisco Sánchez

Personal details
- Born: 1665 Mora, Kingdom of Spain
- Died: 11 November 1733 (aged 67–68) Santiago, Captaincy General of Chile, Spanish Empire
- Spouse(s): María Camps; María Francisca Velaz de Medrano
- Profession: Lieutenant General

Gabriel Cano de Aponte (or Gabriel Cano y Aponte) was a Spanish soldier who served as Royal Governor of Chile from 1717 to 1733. His administration was the longest of all Colonial Governors and the second longest in the history of Chile after the administration of General Augusto Pinochet, who surpassed him by some eight months.

== Life ==
Gabriel Cano was born in the town of Mora, near Toledo, the son of Juan Cano Ruiz and of Josefa de Aponte Carvajal. Cano joined the Spanish army and fought in Flanders for 33 years, rising through the ranks from Alférez to Brigadier and finally Marshal. He married María Campos, but she died in 1713 without descendants.

Due to his outstanding valor and performance during the War of the Spanish Succession he was promoted to Lieutenant General on 28 October 1715, three days later being appointed Royal Governor of Chile.

=== Mariá Francisca Vélaz de Medrano ===
On 5 January 1716 he married again, this time with María Francisca Velaz de Medrano Navarra y Puelles, in the city of Pamplona. María Francisca Vélaz de Medrano was 24 years old, while he was already in his fifties. She was the daughter of María de Larrea and José Vélaz de Medrano y Navarra, 4th Viscount of Azpa, Lord of Mendillori and the town of Autol. The marital agreements were formalized on January 5, 1716, with the bride's father contributing a dowry of 3,000 ducats, charged as an encumbrance on his entail, plus 4,000 pesos in jewelry. They had two sons: José Antonio de Aponte y Medrano and Juan Gabriel de Aponte y Medrano. They travelled together to Chile to assume his position, arriving to Santiago on 17 December 1717. His wife Mariá Francisca Vélaz de Medrano was reported to be a skillful keyboard performer.

=== As governor of Chile ===
In a flare up of the Arauco War he fought the Mapuche toqui Vilumilla in the Mapuche Uprising of 1723. It was ended with the Peace of Negrete in 1726.

In 1725, Governor Cano attempted to repress contraband, without complete success, due to the wit and skills of the French and Dutch merchants and the complicity of some of the Kingdom's influential citizens.

=== Death ===
As a soldier, Cano was an innovative horseman, and historians have documented Cano's "inclination for unbridled fun and equestrian exercises". On 26 July 1733, while he was participating in a game on horseback, Cano suffered an equestrian accident when he fell with his horse and was crushed by it. The sequence of events that caused his death three months later are unclear, but what is clear is that Cano was badly injured and never recovered, dying on 11 November the same year.

It has been stated that a spinal lesion caused by the accident kept him bedridden for a period of three months, clear in reason and with intense pain, before his death. However, there is no evidence that conveys any typical sign associated to spinal injury following the accident. Therefore, it is possible that Cano suffered a complex pelvic ring fracture. The fact that he was prostrated, lucid, but suffered intense pain best sustains the hypothesis of a pelvic fracture. After the initial period, one of the most common causes of death resulting from a pelvic fracture is deep venous thrombosis with secondary pulmonary thrombo-embolism. This must have been the sequence of events that most probably caused Cano de Aponte's death.

== Additional information ==
=== See also ===
- Vilumilla
- Arauco War
- Mapuche people
- List of unusual deaths in the early modern period

=== Sources ===
- Bravo G, Sebastián; Moles P, Paula; Quiroga M, Daniela; Pancorvo P, Renzo; Espinoza G, Ricardo (September 2008). "A propósito de la muerte de Cano de Aponte y los accidentes ecuestres". Revista Médica de Chile (in Spanish). Santiago, Chile: LILACS. pp. 1213–1218.
- Carvallo y Goyeneche, Vicente (1875). Miguel Luis Amunategui (ed.). Descripción Histórica y Geografía del Reino de Chile Vol. II (1626 - 1787). Coleccion de historiadores de Chile y documentos relativos a la historia nacional (in Spanish). Vol. IX (Instituto Chileno de Cultura Hispánica, Academia Chilena de la Historia ed.). Santiago, Chile: Imprenta de La Estrella de Chile. p. 483.
- Castedo, Leopoldo (1954). Resumen de la Historia de Chile de Francisco Antonio Encina (in Spanish). Vol. 2. Santiago, Chile: Empresa Editora Zig-Zag.
- Encina, Francisco Antonio (1940–1952). Historia de Chile: desde la prehistoria hasta 1891 (in Spanish). Vol. I–XX. Santiago, Chile: Editorial Nascimento.
- Medina, José Toribio (1906). Diccionario Biográfico Colonial de Chile (PDF) (in Spanish). Santiago, Chile: Imprenta Elzeviriana. pp. 165–166.
- "Gabriel Cano y Aponte" (in Spanish). Santiago, Chile: Diario La Tercera. Archived from the original on April 4, 2008.

Government offices
Preceded by José de Santiago Concha	Royal Governor of Chile; 1717–1733	Succeeded by Francisco Sánchez
