= Maury A. Bromsen =

American bibliophile and dealer of antiquarian books, maps, and manuscripts

Maury Austin Bromsen (1919–2005) was an American bibliophile and dealer of antiquarian books, maps, and manuscripts relating to the Spanish colonization of the Americas. He earned an undergraduate degree from the City College of New York, and a master's degree in Latin American history from U.C. Berkeley.

== Life and career ==
Bromsen began selling books as early as 1941, while teaching at City College in New York, and spent two years at the University of Chile, in 1941 and in 1947, as both student and teacher.

For several years Bromsen was a member of the Department of Cultural Affairs for the Pan American Union. During this time, he founded the quarterly Revista Interamericana de Bibliografía / Inter-American Review of Bibliography and acted as Executive Secretary of the Medina Centennial Exhibition held in Washington D.C. in November 1952.

Upon his demise Bromsen left the John Carter Brown Library more than four million dollars and approximately 10,000 books and several thousand manuscripts.
