= Mapuche uprising of 1723 =

Rebellion against the Spanish Empire in colonial Chile

- Part of Arauco War
Date	March 9, 1723 – February 13, 1726
Location	Araucanía
Result	Parliament of Negrete: Mapuche-Spanish trade regulated through 3-4 fairs per year; Spanish merchants monopoly broken

Belligerents
Mapuche rebels	Spanish Empire

Commanders and leaders
Vilumilla	Gabriel Cano de Aponte; Manuel de Salamanca

The Mapuche uprising of 1723 was a rebellion of the Mapuche (an Indigenous people of western South America) against the Spanish Empire and its colonial administration in present-day Chile. It began with the killing of Pascual Delgado by Mapuches and continued until Mapuche factions begun to sue for peace in 1725. The Spanish reinforced the fort of Purén, and most of the Spanish managed to find refuge in the various forts without being intercepted or harassed by Mapuches. On August Mapuche toki Vilumilla pushed north occupying Isla del Laja, that is the lands between Bío Bío and Laja rivers. The Spanish led by Manuel de Salamanca attacked a Mapuche encampment of warriors August 24, a day of heavy rain. The Mapuche initially fought with tenacity but came to believe they were being surrounded so they fled the scene.

Eventually, peace was established by treaty again on February 13, 1726 in the Parliament of Negrete.

== Bibliography ==
- Barros Arana, Diego. Historia general de Chile (in Spanish). Vol. Tomo cuarto (Digital edition based on the second edition of 2000 ed.). Alicante: Biblioteca Virtual Miguel de Cervantes.
- Pinochet Ugarte, Augusto; Villaroel Carmona, Rafael; Lepe Orellana, Jaime; Fuente-Alba Poblete, J. Miguel; Fuenzalida Helms, Eduardo (1997). Historia militar de Chile (in Spanish) (3rd ed.). Biblioteca Militar.
