= Juan Andrés de Ustariz =

Royal Governor of Chile (1656–1718)

Don Juan Andrés de Ustariz Caballero de Santiago

Royal Governor of Chile
- In office February 27, 1709 – December 23, 1716
- Monarch: Philip V
- Preceded by: Francisco Ibáñez
- Succeeded by: José de Santiago Concha

Personal details
- Born: 31 March 1656 Narbarte, Navarre, Spain
- Died: 19 May 1718 (aged 62) Santiago, Chile
- Spouse: Francisca de Ollo
- Profession: Lieutenant General

Juan Andrés de Ustariz de Vertizberea (March 31, 1656, Narbarte, Navarre – May 19, 1718) was a Royal Governor of Chile during the early 18th century.

In his 1715 trial of residence Ustariz was accused of having supported Alejandro Garzón's insubordination towards the Governor of Chiloé José Marín de Velasco in a round that derived in the 1712 Huilliche rebellion in Chiloé Archipelago. Further Ustariz would have protected Garzón after the latter fled from Calbuco. This done, Marín was reconstituted as Royal Governor of Chiloé in 1715.

== Sources ==
- Cordoba y Figueroa, Pedro de (1862). "Libro Sesto, XIII & XIV". Historia de Chile (1492–1717) (eBook). Coleccion de historiadores de Chile (in Spanish). Vol. II (Instituto Chileno de Cultura Hispánica, Academia Chilena de la Historia ed.). Santiago, Chile: Imprenta del Ferrocarril.
- Eyzaguirre, José Ignacio Víctor (1850). Historia eclesiastica: Politica y literaria de Chile (eBook) (in Spanish). Valparaíso, Chile: Imprenta del Comercio. pp. 205–206.
- Medina, José Toribio (1906). Diccionario Biográfico Colonial de Chile (PDF) (in Spanish). Santiago, Chile: Imprenta Elzeviriana. pp. 1, 006.

Government offices
Preceded by Francisco Ibáñez	Royal Governor of Chile; 1709–1716	Succeeded by José de Santiago Concha
