= Pedro Porter Casanate =

Spanish Navy officer and explorer (1611–1662)

Don Pedro Porter Caballero de Santiago

Royal Governor of Chile
- In office 1656–1662
- Monarch: Philip IV
- Preceded by: Francisco Antonio de Acuña
- Succeeded by: Diego González Montero

Personal details
- Born: 30 April 1611 Zaragoza, Spain
- Died: 27 February 1662 (aged 50) Concepción, Chile
- Profession: Admiral

Pedro Porter y Casanate (30 April 1611 – 27 February 1662) was a Spanish Navy officer, explorer and colonial administrator who served as the Royal Governor of Chile from 1656 to 1662.

== Early life ==
Porter was born in Zaragoza, the second son of Juan Porter and Esperanza Casanate. In 1627, he joined the Spanish Navy, and under Admiral Fadrique de Toledo participated in the expedition against La Rochelle. The year after, he joined the fleet of Admiral Francisco de Vallecilla, charged with protecting the silver galleons from pirate attacks. In 1629, he travelled to the new world for the first time and participated in the Battle of St. Kitts. He proceeded to take part in several conflicts in his time and in numerous naval expeditions in the Indies, as a consequence of which he was promoted to alférez in 1631, and sea captain in 1634. The same year, he published his first book on naval themes, the Correction to mistakes of the Spanish navigation (Spanish: Reparo a errores de la navegación española).

Later he would become an admiral of the South Seas fleet. He was knight of the Order of Santiago.

== Explorations ==
In 1635, he applied for and got from the Viceroy of New Spain marquis de Cerralvo a license to explore California, a territory that although located within the borders of the Spanish Empire was unknown whether it was an island or peninsula. Nonetheless, problems and suspicions about his intentions led to the confiscation of his ships. In 1636, he tried again, this time with the license and economic sponsorship of Viceroy marquis de Cadereyta.

In 1643 king Philip IV relieved him from his position in the Navy, ordering him to explore California. That same year he left from Cádiz for Cartagena de Indias, from where he left for Veracruz, and crossing the continent he arrived on the west coast of Mexico; where he would remain until 1649, exploring and colonizing the area of the Gulf of California.

Considered as an expert in naval matters, his treatises were appreciated at the time. Among them were: Diccionario náutico, Hidrografía general, Arte de navegar.

== Governor of Chile ==
In 1656 he was designated as governor of the Captaincy General of Chile, in whose functions he took part in the Arauco War against the Mapuche rebels. During his government he founded the fortress of San Miguel Arcángel de Colcura, built southeast of the modern city of Lota on the site of the old Fort Colcura in the valley of Colcura. He would remain in this position until his death in 1662 in Concepción due to edema.

== Additional information ==
=== Sources ===
- Mathes, W. Michel. Datos biográficos sobre el Almirante de las Californias Pedro Porter y Casanate (PDF) (in Spanish). Mexico: Universidad Nacional de Mexico. Archived from the original (PDF) on 2011-07-16.
- Medina, José Toribio (1906). Diccionario Biográfico Colonial de Chile (PDF) (in Spanish). Santiago, Chile: Imprenta Elzeviriana. pp. 697–698.

Government offices
Preceded by Francisco Antonio de Acuña	Royal Governor of Chile; 1656–1662	Succeeded by Diego González Montero
