= Manuel Silvestre de Salamanca Cano =

Governor of the Kingdom of Chile

Manuel Silvestre de Salamanca Cano was governor of the Captaincy General of Chile between May 1734 and November 1737.

He was the nephew of the earlier governor Gabriel Cano de Aponte and was the maestre de campo of its government. He was married in Concepcion to Isabel de Zabala.

Government offices
Preceded by Francisco de Sánchez de la Barreda	Royal Governor of Chile; 1734–1737	Succeeded by José Manso de Velasco
