= Pedro Osores de Ulloa =

Royal Governor of Chile (1554–1624)

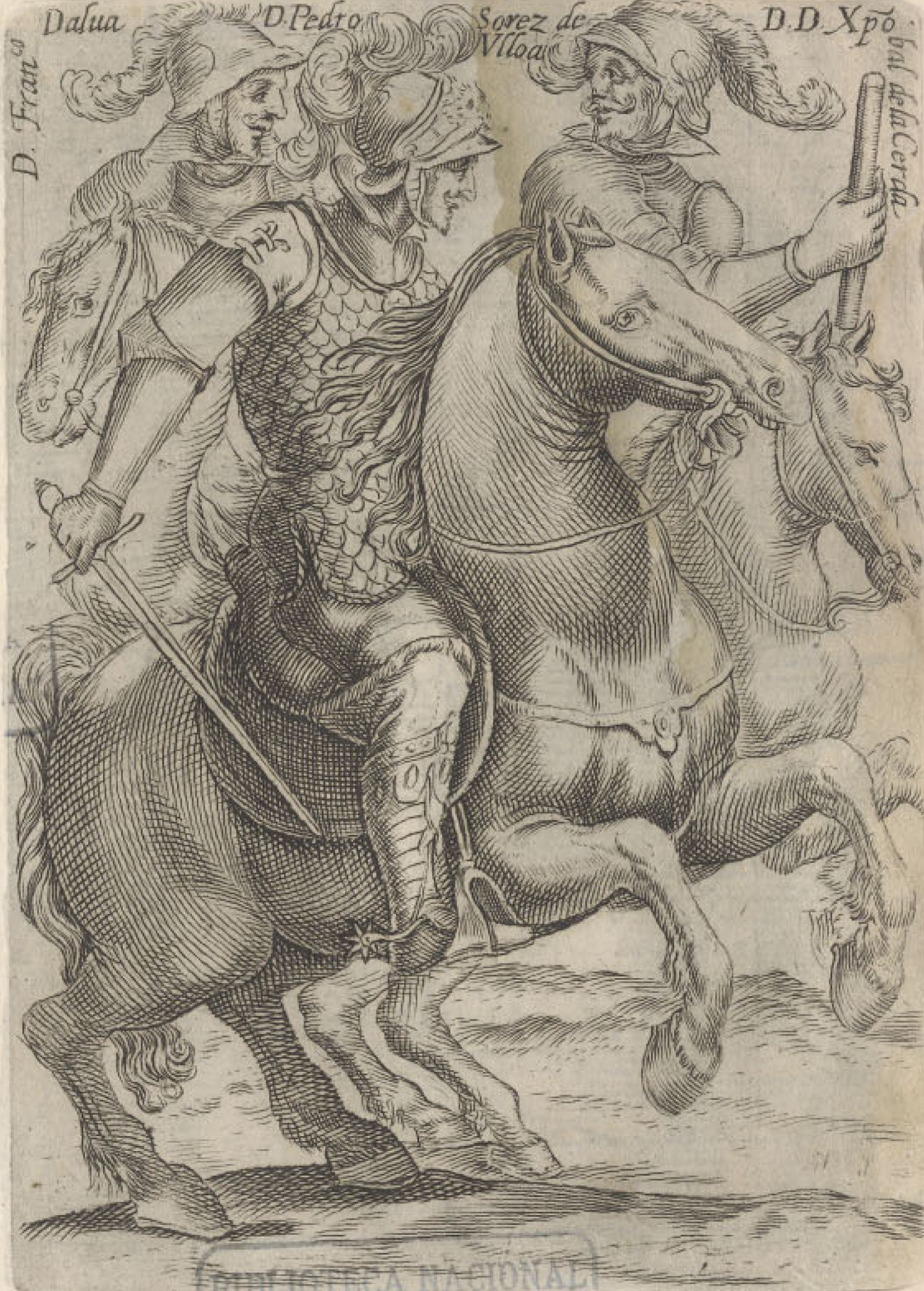
A drawing of Francisco de Alava, Pedro Osores de Ulloa and Cristóbal de la Cerda:Spanish governors of Chile(1621-1624)

Pedro Osores de Ulloa (Saa, Vigo, 1554 – Concepcion, Chile, September 18, 1624) was Royal Governor of Chile from November 1621 to September 1624. He replaced Cristóbal de la Cerda y Sotomayor. On his death bed Osores appointed his brother-in-law Francisco de Álava y Nureña as temporary governor in September 1624. Was a knight of the Order of Alcántara

== Sources ==
- Medina, José Toribio (1906). Diccionario Biográfico Colonial de Chile (PDF) (in Spanish). Santiago, Chile: Imprenta Elzeviriana. p. 627.

Government offices
| Preceded by Cristóbal de la Cerda | Royal Governor of Chile; 1621–1624 | Succeeded by Francisco de Álava |
