= Diego Dávila, 1st Marquis of Navamorcuende =

Diego Dávila Coello y Pacheco, 1st Marquis of Navamorcuende, 17th Lord of Cardiel, El Bodón, Montalvo, El Hito and of Villar de Cañas (Spanish: Diego Dávila Coello y Pacheco, primer Marqués de Navamorcuende, 17avo Señor de Cardiel, El Bodón, Montalvo, El Hito y Villar de Cañas) (c. 1621 – c. 1680) was a Spanish soldier and colonial administrator who served as Royal Governor of Chile from March 19, 1667, to February 18, 1670.

== Sources ==
- Medina, José Toribio (1906). Diccionario Biográfico Colonial de Chile (PDF) (in Spanish). Santiago, Chile: Imprenta Elzeviriana. pp. 235–236.

Government offices
| Preceded by Francisco de Meneses | Royal Governor of Chile; 1667–1670 | Succeeded by Diego González |
Spanish nobility
| Preceded by New creation | Marquis of Navamorcuende; 1674 | Succeeded by María Magdalena Dávila Coello y Pacheco |
