= Antonio Gramusset =

Antonio Gramusset (1740–1784) was a French adventurer living in Chile, and one of the co-conspirators in the Conspiracy of the Tres Antonios.

He was born in Premelieu, and arrived to Chile around 1764. Once there, he first tried to become a priest, and later he joined a military regiment composed of foreigners, as a cadet. Soon after he abandoned that career too, in order to try to become rich by renting a parcel of land and dedicating himself to agriculture. He also dabbled as an inventor, and developed an impracticable scheme to supply water to Santiago.

In 1780, he joined Antonio Berney and José Antonio de Rojas in a plan to establish Chile as an independent republic. They were soon discovered, denounced and arrested on January 1, 1781. He and Berney, because being foreigners, were sent as prisoners first to Lima and then to Spain to be tried. The ship that was carrying them, the San Pedro de Alcantara, went down in front of the coasts of Portugal during a storm. Gramusset survived the sinking but died three months later due to the exposure suffered.
