= José de Santiago Concha, 1st Marquess of Casa Concha =

Royal Governor of Chile (1667–1741)

The Most Illustrious The Marquess of Casa Concha
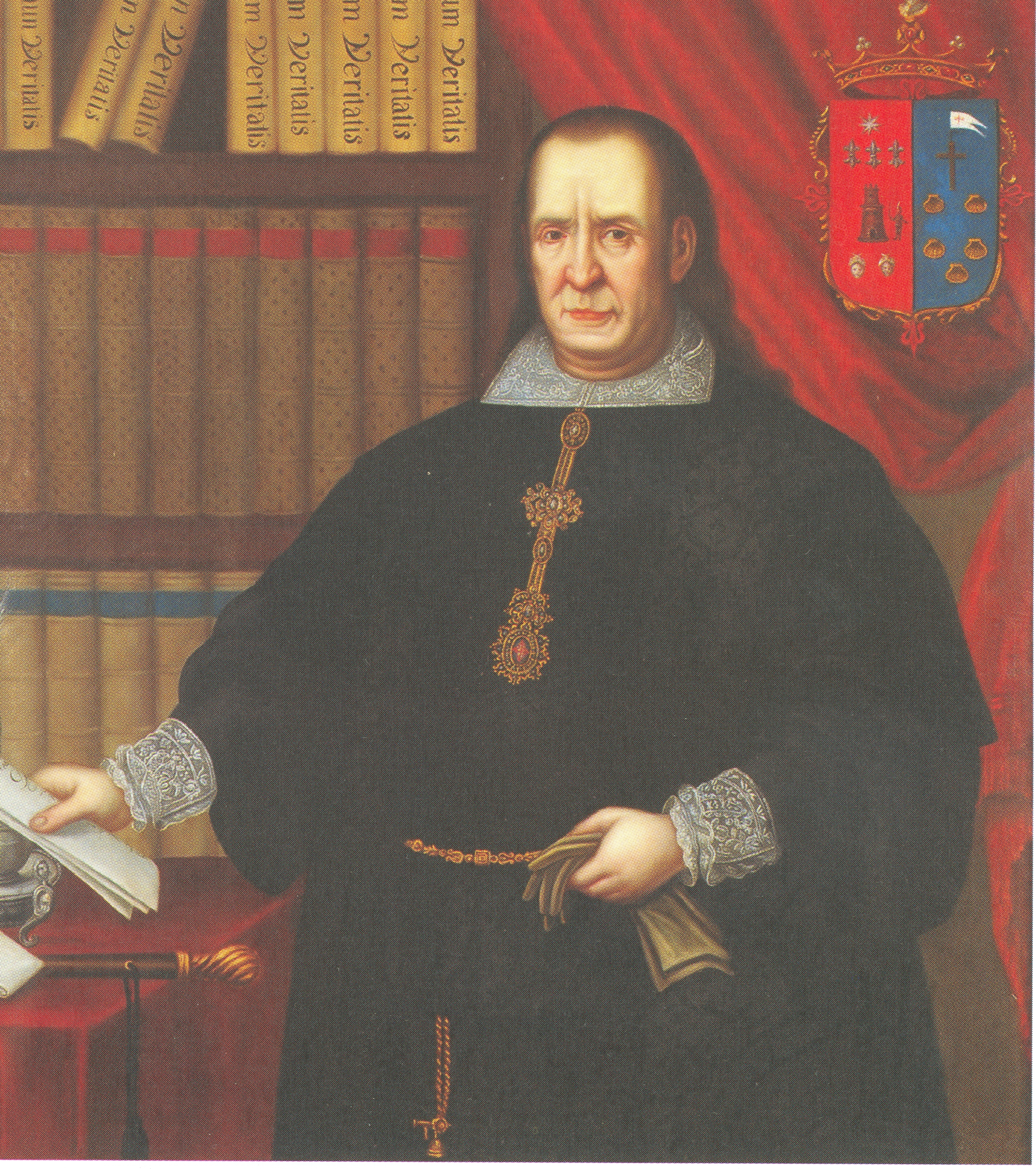

Royal Governor of Chile
- In office December 1716 – 17 December 1717
- Monarch: Philip V
- Preceded by: Juan Andrés de Ustariz
- Succeeded by: Gabriel Cano de Aponte

Personal details
- Born: October 30, 1667 Lima, Viceroyalty of Peru
- Died: March 11, 1741 (aged 73–74) Lima, Viceroyalty of Peru
- Spouse: Ángela María Roldán Dávila

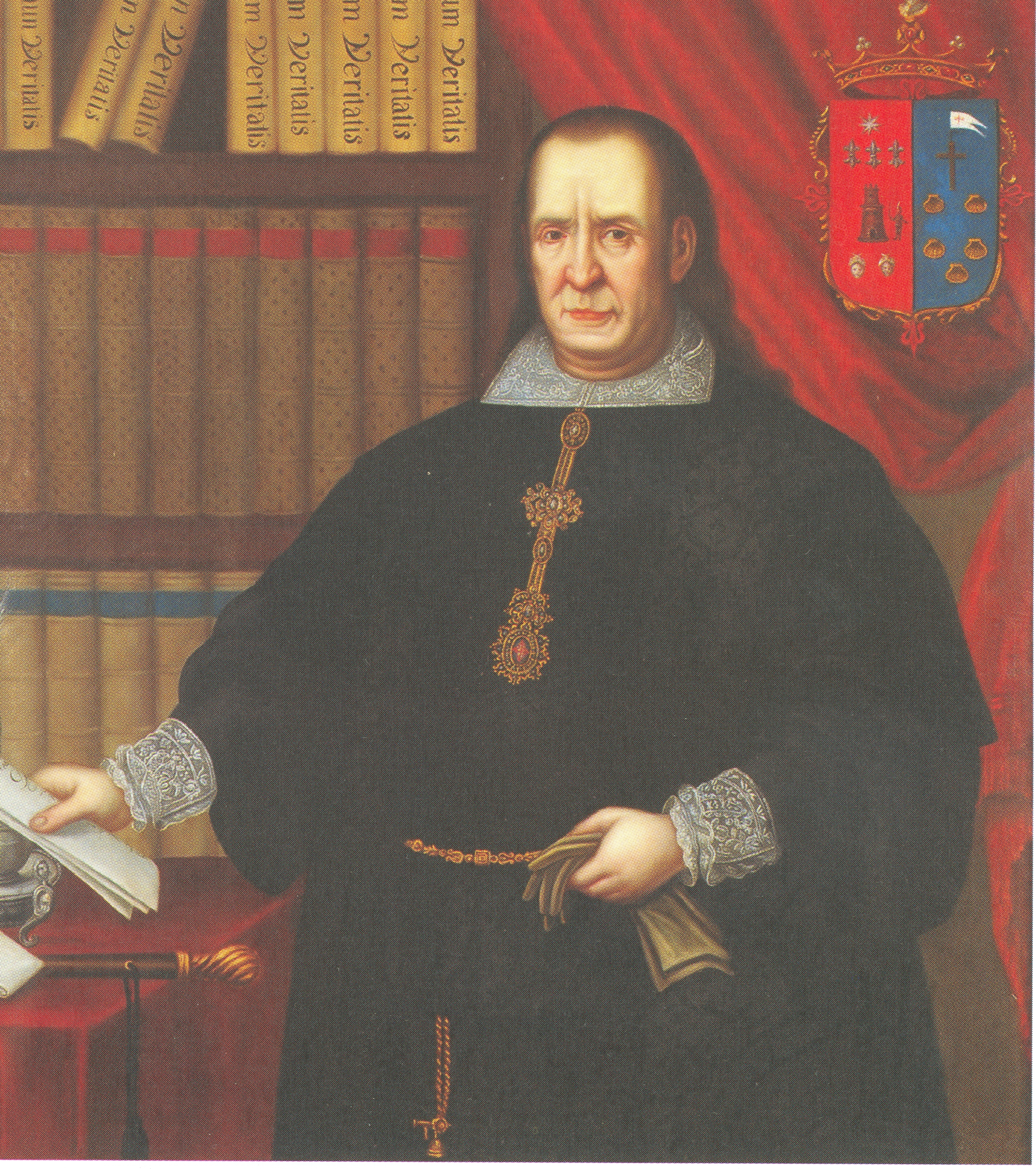
José de Santiago Concha

José de Santiago Concha y Salvatierra, 1st Marquess of Casa Concha (Lima, Peru, October 30, 1667 – Lima, Peru, March 11, 1741) was a Spanish politician and Royal Governor of Chile.

He studied at the National University of San Marcos, and then at the University of Salamanca for a Bachelor of Canon Law. He received the title of Knight of the Order of Calatrava due to his noble lineage. He later served as a magistrate in Lima, later serving in a somewhat similar capacity as an oidor in the Real Audiencia of Chile from 1709 to 1710. He then returned to Lima to perform his old duties, until the King named him interim governor of Chile.

== Rule in Chile ==
Santiago Concha arrived in Chile in Valparaíso on March 5, 1717, and officially took power on the 20th of the same month. He took up a long-standing royal order to found settlements, with the goal of grouping inhabitants in determined areas. Thus, in November he went to the Aconcagua River valley and personally founded the city of Quillota.

In December 1717, he left his temporary post and returned to Lima, where he died a few years later. Philip V granted him the title of Marquis of Casa Concha in 1718 in honor of his service to the crown.

Government offices
Preceded by Juan Andrés de Ustariz	Royal Governor of Chile; 1716–1717	Succeeded by Gabriel Cano
