= Tomás Álvarez de Acevedo =

Spanish politician (1735–1788)

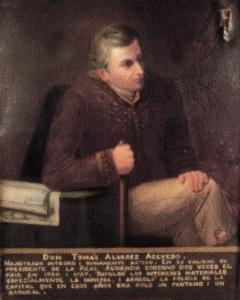
Tomás Antonio Álvarez de Acevedo Ordaz

Tomás Antonio Álvarez de Acevedo Ordaz was a Spanish colonial administrator who was President of the Real Audiencia of Santiago between 1776 and 1788.

He also served twice as interim Royal Governor of Chile, first in 1780 and again between 1787 and 1788.

== Additional information ==
=== Sources ===
- Barros Arana, Diego (1886). Historia Jeneral de Chile (in Spanish). Vol. VI. Santiago, Chile: Rafael Jover. ISBN 978-0-598-48233-4.
- Carvallo y Goyeneche, Vicente (1875). Miguel Luis Amunategui (ed.). Descripción Histórica y Geografía del Reino de Chile Vol. II (1626–1787). Coleccion de historiadores de Chile y documentos relativos a la historia nacional (in Spanish). Vol. IX (Instituto Chileno de Cultura Hispánica, Academia Chilena de la Historia ed.). Santiago, Chile: Imprenta de La Estrella de Chile. p. 483.
- Gay, Claudio (1848). Historia física y política de Chile (1749–1808) (in Spanish). Vol. IV. Paris, France: En casa del autor. p. 506.
- Medina, José Toribio (1906). Diccionario Biográfico Colonial de Chile (PDF) (in Spanish). Santiago, Chile: Imprenta Elzeviriana. pp. 126–127.
- Pérez García, José (1900). José Toribio Medina (ed.). Historia Natural, Militar, Civil y Sagrada del Reino de Chile (Vol. II) (PDF). Coleccion de historiadores de Chile y documentos relativos a la historia nacional (in Spanish). Vol. XXIII (Instituto Chileno de Cultura Hispánica, Academia Chilena de la Historia ed.). Santiago, Chile: Imprenta Elzeviriana.

Government offices
Preceded by Agustín de Jáuregui	Royal Governor of Chile; 1780	Succeeded by Ambrosio de Benavides
Preceded by Ambrosio de Benavides	Royal Governor of Chile; 1787–1788	Succeeded by The Marquess of Osorno
