= José de Garro =

Royal Governor of Chile, 1623–1702

Marcos José de Garro Senei de Artola, nicknamed "El Santo" ("The Saint"), (1623–1702) was a Spanish military man who served in many positions in the colonial administration of the Spanish Empire. He served as governor of Tucumán from 1675–1678, governor of Buenos Aires from 1678–1682 and governor of Chile from 1682-1692. In Spain, he was military commander of the garrison at Gibraltar and Captain General of the Basque Country, a charge which he held until his death in 1702. In the colonies, his nickname was "El Santo" ("The Saint") for his religious piety. He is most well known for his successful attack on the competing Portuguese settlement at Colonia del Sacramento, constituting the first Spanish capture of the town.

== Beginning of his military career ==
Garro was born in Mondragón, Guipúzcoa. As a youth, Garro enlisted in the Spanish Army and participated in campaigns in Catalonia and Portugal, until he reached the rank of colonel (maestre de campo, the rank immediately below Captain General) of a tercio. His career in Spain then suffered a setback: according to historian Diego Barros Arana, "Due to a violent altercation with a General who had rank of Grandee in Spain, Garro was subjected to the vengeance of a powerful enemy. Preferring instead to live away from the Court, he requested a post in the Indies and obtained the governorship of the province of Tucumán."

== In Argentina ==
For four years, from 1675 to 1678, Garro served as governor of the isolated province of Tucumán, dependent to the Real Audiencia de Charcas and part of the Viceroyalty of Peru. During his tenure, he organized three punitive expeditions to Chaco, with no major consequences except the foundation of Fort El Pongo to the east of Jujuy to protect that city. After this, Garro was promoted to become the governor of Buenos Aires, a province of the Viceroyalty of the Río de la Plata.

=== Expulsion of the Portuguese from Uruguay ===
In 1680, Garro undertook the expulsion of the Portuguese from Colonia del Sacramento, founded in 1679-1680 in present-day Uruguay by Manuel de Lobo, governor of Rio de Janeiro. In that campaign, Garro surprised the Portuguese garrison with a militia including 3,000 Guaranían Indians from the Jesuit Reductions. The city was captured after a battle in which 100 of the Portuguese colonial army of 1000 were killed, with the Spanish army taking enemy troops and residents prisoner and seizing Lobo himself, who was later remitted to the custody of Chile. The seizure of Colonia del Sacramento, as it was undertaken without his permission, was disavowed by the king of Spain, and the settlement was returned to Portugal the next year, in 1681, following a provisional treaty made in the expectation of further negotiations including the setting up of a boundary commission, eventually concluding with the Treaty of Utrecht in 1713.

== Governor of Chile ==

Garro was Royal Governor of Chile in 1682-1692. As Royal Governor of Chile, Garro could not embark on the major campaigns against the Mapuches that he desired, after such a plan was disapproved of by the King of Spain. After earlier Spanish failures, Garro had proposed to the viceroy of Peru, the Duke of La Plata, and the King of Spain that the Mapuche chiefs and elders be invited to a conference where they were to be imprisoned so that Araucanía could be pacified relatively bloodlessly. However, in 1686, King Charles II of Spain rejected the plan as deceitful. He was also unable to dedicate as much time to the frequent legal disputes that arose with the magistrates of the Real Audiencia of Chile, nor to the promotion of the monastic life to which he was especially devoted. Nevertheless, Garro was known for his moral leadership, for which he was known as "El Santo" ("The Saint"), particularly in the exile of two audencia judges, Sancho Garcia Salazar and Juan de la Cueva y Lugo, for sinful conduct. Instead, Garro's service was consumed with defeating the expeditions of privateers, which occurred more frequently each month.

=== Privateers ===
Garro decreed the depopulation of the Isla Mocha, with the goal of denying resources to pirates who had ravaged the Pacific coast. Notable privateers operating in the area at this time included Englishmen Edward Davis and Charles Swan in 1684, Englishman William Knight in 1686, and Jean Strong in 1690. With the depopulation of the Isla Mocha, the man in charge of the project, Jerónimo de Quiroga, recorded that the local indigenous people: "went in baskets of bulrush a distance of 12 leagues all without losing a thing." At the same time, Garro decreed the construction of the Castillo (Castle) San José de Valparaíso, the first fortification of that port town. He also organized novenas and acts of devotion praying that the danger be averted.

== Return to Spain ==
Garro's actions in America were well received at the Court, and he was given the command of Gibraltar. While there, in 1691, he was fined 4,000 maravedíes for failing throughout his period of office there to order the reforestation of the nearby hills. Later, the position of Captain General (military governor) of the Basque Country.

Garro died in San Sebastián, Guipúzcoa in 1702.

Government offices
Preceded by	Royal Governor of Tucumán; 1675–1678	Succeeded by
Preceded by Andrés de Robles	Royal Governor of Buenos Aires; 1678–1682	Succeeded by José de Herrera
Preceded by Juan Henríquez de Villalobos	Royal Governor of Chile; 1682–1692	Succeeded by Tomás Marín de Poveda
