= Spanish ship San Pedro de Alcantara =

History

Spain
- Name: San Pedro de Alcantara
- Builder: Cuba
- Launched: 1770
- Fate: Sank on 2 February 1786

General characteristics
- Class & type: 64-gun ship of the line
- Sail plan: Full-rigged ship
- Armament: 64 guns of various weights of shot

San Pedro de Alcantara was a 64-gun Spanish man-of-war, which sank near Peniche, Portugal, loaded with so much treasure that her shipwreck shocked the financial markets of Spain. The cargo was eventually salvaged, and the scattered remains were investigated in 1988 and 1996.

== Career ==
San Pedro de Alcantara was built of mahogany in Cuba in 1770, by an English shipbuilder in Spanish service. She sailed to Peru in 1784, where she loaded about 600 tons of copper, 153 tons of silver and four tons of gold from Peruvian mines. She also carried a collection of ancient ceramics from the Chimu culture, as well as political prisoners from the Túpac Amaru Rebellion (including Túpac Amaru's 12-year-old son) and from the Conspiracy of the Tres Antonios in Chile. The silver was in the form of minted coins, mostly "pieces of eight". Unfortunately the ship was heavily overloaded and the cargo was about twice as much as usual for such a ship. The captain was even warned that the ship would risk losing her bottom in a storm. However, there were no exact rules for the loading of ships, so she sailed for Spain anyway.

During her voyage from Peru, San Pedro de Alcantara was constantly leaking, and the crew had a hard time manning the pumps. She was forced to put into the port of Talcahuano, in Chile, where major repairs were effected. After rounding Cape Horn, the ship had to be taken in again for repairs at Rio de Janeiro, where the leaks were again fixed. The ship continued her journey to Spain in early 1786.

San Pedro de Alcantara sank in a storm on February 2, 1786, at approximately 10.30 PM, off Peniche, on the Portuguese coast, with the loss of 128 people. There were 270 survivors. Salvage operations began almost immediately, carried out by around 40 underwater divers, who without the help of any breathing apparatus brought up almost 750 tons of cargo over the three years following the disaster.

== Bibliography ==
- Carvallo y Goyeneche, Vicente (1875). Miguel Luis Amunategui (ed.). Descripción Histórica y Geografía del Reino de Chile Vol. II (1626 - 1787). Coleccion de historiadores de Chile y documentos relativos a la historia nacional (in Spanish). Vol. IX (Instituto Chileno de Cultura Hispánica, Academia Chilena de la Historia ed.). Santiago, Chile: Imprenta de La Estrella de Chile. p. 427.
- Russo, Jorge. "A Arqueologia Nautica de Peniche". Nautical Archaeology Program, Texas A&M University (in Portuguese). GEPS.
- Winfield, Rif; Tredrea, John M; García-Torralba Pérez, Enrique & Blasco Felip, Manuel (2023). Spanish Warships in the Age of Sail 1700—1860: Design, Construction, Careers and Fates. Seaforth Publishing. ISBN 978-1-5267-9078-1.
