= Royal Governor of Chile =

Title for the ruler of the Captaincy General of Chile

The royal governor of Chile ruled over the Spanish colonial administrative district called the Captaincy General of Chile, and as a result the royal governor also held the title of a captain general. There were 66 such governors or captains during the Spanish conquest and the later periods of Spanish-centered colonialism. Since the first Spanish–Mapuche parliaments in the 17th century it became an almost mandatory tradition for each governor to arrange a parliament with the Mapuches.

== List of governors ==
Picture	Name	Entered office	Exited office	Notes	Appointed by
	Pedro de Valdivia	11 June 1540	December 1547		Charles V
	Francisco de Villagra	December 1547	20 July 1549		Charles V
	Pedro de Valdivia	20 July 1549	25 December 1553	Killed at the Battle of Tucapel.	Charles V
	Rodrigo de Quiroga	25 December 1553	February 1555		Charles V
	Francisco de Villagra	25 December 1553	February 1555	Triumvirate	Charles V
	Francisco de Aguirre	25 December 1553	February 1555		Charles V
	Cabildos of Chile	February 1555	23 May 1556	The cities of Chile governed themselves while the dispute over the governorship was settled by the Real Audiencia in Lima.	Charles V
		February 1555	23 May 1556	The cities of Chile governed themselves while the dispute over the governorship was settled by the Real Audiencia in Lima.	Philip II
	Francisco de Villagra	23 May 1556	April 1557		Philip II
	García Hurtado de Mendoza	April 1557	February 1561		Philip II
	Francisco de Villagra	February 1561	June 1563		Philip II
	Pedro de Villagra	June 1563	June 1565		Philip II
	Rodrigo de Quiroga	June 1565	August 1567		Philip II
	Real Audiencia of Chile	August 1567	August 1568		Philip II
	Melchor Bravo de Saravia	August 1568	January 1575		Philip II
	Rodrigo de Quiroga	January 1575	February 1580		Philip II
	Martín Ruiz de Gamboa	February 1580	July 1583		Philip II
	Alonso de Sotomayor	September 1583	July 1592		Philip II
	Pedro de Viscarra	July 1592	October 1592		Philip II
	Martín García Óñez de Loyola	October 1592	December 1598	Killed at the Disaster of Curalaba	Philip II
		October 1592	December 1598	Killed at the Disaster of Curalaba	Philip III
	Pedro de Viscarra de la Barrera	December 1598	May 1599		Philip III
	Francisco de Quiñónez	May 1599	July 1600		Philip III
	Alonso García de Ramón	July 1600	February 1601		Philip III
	Alonso de Ribera de Pareja	February 1601	March 1605		Philip III
	Alonso García de Ramón	March 1605	2 September 1610		Philip III
	Luis Merlo de la Fuente Ruiz de Beteta	2 September 1610	January 1611		Philip III
	Juan Jaraquemada	January 1611	27 March 1612		Philip III
	Alonso de Ribera de Pareja	27 March 1612	9 March 1617		Philip III
	Fernando Talaverano Gallegos	9 March 1617	14 January 1618		Philip III
	Lope de Ulloa y Lemos	14 January 1618	8 December 1620		Philip III
	Cristóbal de la Cerda y Sotomayor	8 December 1620	November 1621		Philip III
	Cristóbal de la Cerda y Sotomayor	8 December 1620	November 1621		Philip IV
	Pedro Osores de Ulloa	November 1621	September 1624		Philip IV
	Francisco de Álava y Nureña	September 1624	May 1625		Philip IV
	Luis Fernández de Córdoba y Arce	May 1625	December 1629		Philip IV
	Francisco Laso de la Vega	December 1629	May 1639		Philip IV
	Francisco López de Zúñiga; 2nd Marquis of Baides	May 1639	May 1646		Philip IV
	Martín de Mujica y Buitrón	May 1646	April 1649		Philip IV
	Alonso de Figueroa y Córdoba	April 1649	May 1650		Philip IV
	Francisco Antonio de Acuña Cabrera y Bayona	May 1650	January 1656		Philip IV
	Pedro Porter Casanate	January 1656	February 1662		Philip IV
	Diego González Montero Justiniano	February 1662	May 1662		Philip IV
	Ángel de Peredo	May 1662	January 1664		Philip IV
	Francisco de Meneses Brito	January 1664	1667		Philip IV
	Francisco de Meneses Brito	January 1664	1667		Charles II
	Diego Dávila Coello y Pacheco; 1st Marquis of Navamorcuende	1667	February 1670		Charles II
	Diego González Montero Justiniano	February 1670	October 1670		Charles II
	Juan Henríquez de Villalobos	October 1670	April 1682		Charles II
	Marcos José de Garro Senei de Artola	April 1682	January 1692		Charles II
	Tomás Marín de Poveda; 1st Marquis of Cañada Hermosa	January 1692	December 1700		Charles II
	Tomás Marín de Poveda; 1st Marquis of Cañada Hermosa	January 1692	December 1700		Philip V
	Francisco Ibáñez de Segovia y Peralta	December 1700	February 1709		Philip V
	Juan Andrés de Ustariz	February 1709	December 1716		Philip V
	José de Santiago Concha y Salvatierra	December 1716	17 December 1717		Philip V
		17 December 1717	11 November 1733		Philip V
	Gabriel Cano y Aponte	17 December 1717	11 November 1733		Luis I
		17 December 1717	11 November 1733		Philip V
	Francisco de Sánchez de la Barreda	11 November 1733	May 1734		Philip V
	Manuel Silvestre de Salamanca Cano	May 1734	November 1737		Philip V
	José Antonio Manso de Velasco; Count of Superunda	November 1737	June 1744		Philip V
	Francisco José de Ovando; 1st Marquis of Brindisi	June 1745	25 March 1746		Philip V
	Domingo Ortíz de Rosas; 1st Marquis of Poblaciones	25 March 1746	28 December 1755		Philip V
		25 March 1746	28 December 1755		Ferdinand VI
	Manuel de Amat y Junyent	28 December 1755	9 September 1761		Ferdinand VI
		28 December 1755	9 September 1761		Charles III
	Félix de Berroeta	September 1761	October 1762		Charles III
	Antonio de Guill y Gonzaga	October 1762	August 1768		Charles III
	Juan de Balmaseda	August 1768	March 1770		Charles III
	Francisco Javier de Morales	March 1770	March 1772		Charles III

== Governors and captains general of Chile ==
Picture	Name	Entered office	Exited office	Notes	Appointed by
	Agustín de Jáuregui y Aldecoa	March 1772	July 1780		Charles III
	Tomás Álvarez de Acevedo Ordaz	July 1780	12 December 1780	Interim	Charles III
	Ambrosio de Benavides	12 December 1780	27 April 1787		Charles III
	Tomás Álvarez de Acevedo Ordaz	27 April 1787	16 May 1788	Interim	Charles III

=== Appointed by Charles IV ===
- Ambrosio O'Higgins, Marquis of Osorno: (May 1788 – May 1796)
- José de Rezabal y Ugarte (Interim): (May 1796 – September 1796)
- Gabriel de Avilés, 2nd Marquis of Avilés: (18 September 1796 – 21 January 1799)
- Joaquín del Pino Sánchez de Rojas: (January 1799 – April 1801)
- José de Santiago Concha Jiménez Lobatón (Interim): (April 1801 – December 1801)
- Francisco Tadeo Diez de Medina Vidanges (Interim): (December 1801 – January 1802)
- Luis Muñoz de Guzmán: (January 1802 – February 1808)

=== Appointed by Ferdinand VII ===
- Juan Rodríguez Ballesteros (Interim): (February 1808 – April 1808)
- Francisco Antonio García Carrasco Díaz: (April 1808 – July 1810)

(Dissolved 1810-1814 Patria Vieja)

Period of the Reconquista Española: Governors and Captains General:

- Gabino Gaínza Fernández de Medrano: 19 July 1814 – 26 December 1814
- Mariano Osorio (Interim): (2 October 1814 – 26 December 1815)
- Francisco Marcó del Pont Ángel Díaz y Méndez: (26 December 1815 – 12 February 1817)

== Sources ==
- Barros Arana, Diego (1884–1902). Historia Jeneral de Chile (in Spanish). Vol. I–XVI. Santiago, Chile: Rafael Jover.
- Carvallo y Goyeneche, Vicente (1875). José Toribio Medina; Diego Barros Arana; Francisco Solano Asta Buruaga y Cienfuegos; Miguel Luis Amunátegui; Luis Montt (eds.). Descripcion Histórico-Geográfica del Reino de Chile. Coleccíon de historiadores de Chile y documentos relativos a la historia nacional Vol. 9 (in Spanish). Vol. II. Santiago, Chile: Imprenta del Ferrocarril.
- Medina, José Toribio (1906). Diccionario Biográfico Colonial de Chile (PDF) (in Spanish). Santiago, Chile: Imprenta Elziviriana. pp. 331–332.
