= Fort Colcura =

Coordinates: 37°06′22″S 73°09′39″W

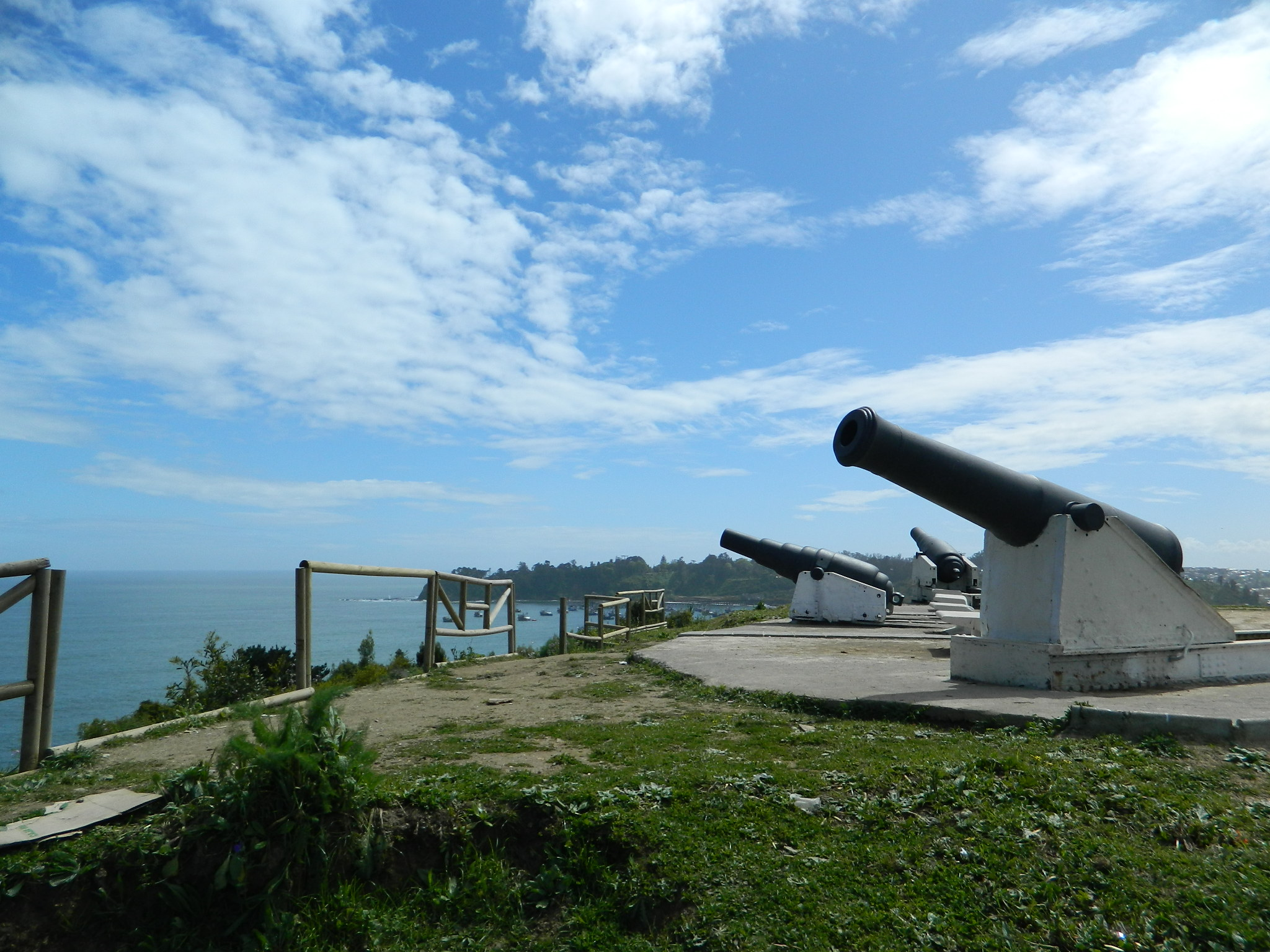
Fuerte Colcura

Fort Colcura was a small fort that was the first Spanish settlement that existed in the commune of Lota, Chile. It was on a small height on the edge of the Bay of Arauco, a little more than two kilometers to the southeast of the modern city of Lota. From its position it dominated the north slope of cerro Marihueñu and the valley of Colcura in whose extreme west is the mouth of the riachuelo Colcura that empties into the cove of Colcura.

This place was established as a small fort at the start of the conquest, and was several times destroyed by the Moluches and repaired. Following the Mapuche Uprising of 1598 it was rebuilt again in 1602 by governor Alonso de Ribera. After the Mapuche Insurrection of 1655, Pedro Porter Casanate built a new fortress of San Miguel Arcángel de Colcura on the same site in 1662.

== See also ==
- La Frontera (geographical region)

== Sources ==
- Francisco Solano Asta-Buruaga y Cienfuegos, Diccionario geográfico de la República de Chile, SEGUNDA EDICIÓN CORREGIDA Y AUMENTADA, NUEVA YORK, D. APPLETON Y COMPAÑÍA, 1899, Pg. 157 Colcura
