= Francisco Bravo de Saravia, 1st Marquess of la Pica =

Spanish nobleman (1628–1703)

Francisco Bravo de Saravia Ovalle

Personal details
- Born: 1628 Santiago, Chile, Viceroyalty of Peru
- Died: August 28, 1703 (aged 74–75) Santiago, Chile, Viceroyalty of Peru
- Occupation: Government
- Profession: Military

Francisco Bravo de Saravia y Ovalle, 1st Marquess of La Pica (1628–1703) was a Spanish nobleman and Lord of Almenar.

== Biography ==
Born in Santiago, was the son of Jerónimo Bravo de Saravia Ossorio de Cáceres and Agustina Lantadilla, descendant of Juan Bautista Pastene. His wife was Marcela Henestrosa daughter of a noble family of Chile.

Francisco Bravo de Saravia Ovalle, was descended of Melchor Bravo de Saravia, was created Marquess of la Pica in 1664.
