= Antonio Berney =

Independence advocate in colonial chile

Antonio Berney, (also known by his birth name Antoine Berney or sometimes Antoine-Alexandre Berney (Note: While commonly referred to as Antoine or Antonio in historical summaries of the Conspiracy of the Three Antonios, several biographical and archival sources (including Spanish-language historical records) identify him by this fuller French name or its Hispanicized version, Antonio-Alejandro Berney)), was a French educator and intellectual who became a central figure in the Conspiracy of the Three Antonios (Conspiración de los Tres Antonios), one of the earliest republican plots against Spanish colonial rule in Chile.

== Early life and career ==
Berney was born in France and moved to the Captaincy General of Chile around 1776. Settling in Santiago, he found employment as a professor of Latin and Mathematics at the Convictorio Carolino, a prestigious educational institution. Berney was deeply influenced by Enlightenment philosophy and the "biblical republicanism" that viewed the establishment of a republic as both a political and theological necessity.

== The Conspiracy of the Three Antonios ==
In 1780, Berney formulated a radical plan to liberate Chile from the Spanish monarchy and establish an independent republic. He recruited two primary co-conspirators who shared his first name:

- Antonio Gramusset: A French adventurer and failed inventor living in Chile.
- José Antonio de Rojas: A prominent Chilean criollo and captain in the cavalry who provided the group with social standing and connections.

The trio's vision was remarkably progressive for the era, preceding the French Revolution by nearly a decade. Their proposed constitution included the abolition of slavery and social hierarchies, the elimination of the death penalty, and agrarian reform. They also proposed the establishment of a government let by an elected senate.

== Discovery and death ==
The conspiracy was compromised in late 1780 when Gramusset lost a valise containing detailed plans of the plot. The documents were found and eventually reached the Spanish authorities. On January 1, 1781, Berney and his associates were secretly arrested in a nighttime raid during New Year's celebrations.

Because Berney and Gramusset were foreigners, they were treated with relative courtesy but were ultimately ordered to be sent to Spain for trial. After being held in Lima for a year, they were boarded onto the ship San Pedro de Alcántara. In 1784, the vessel sank during a storm off the coast of Peniche, Portugal. Berney drowned in the disaster, while Gramusset survived the initial wreck only to die of exposure months later.

== See also ==
- Conspiracy of the Three Antonios
- Chilean War of Independence
- List of Chilean coups d'état
- History of Chile
