= Conspiracy of the three Antonios =

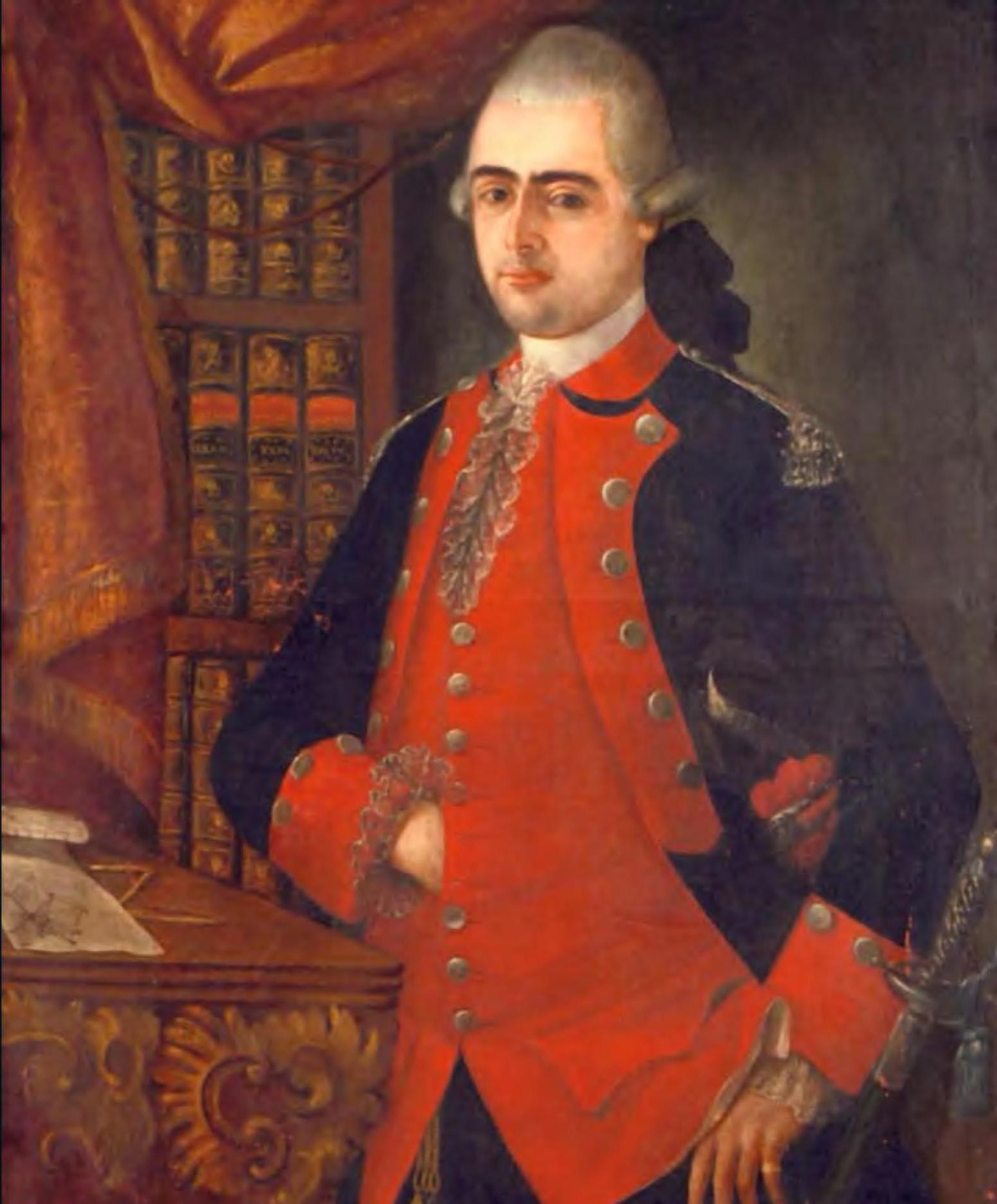
Jose Antonio de Rojas

The conspiracy of the three Antonios (1781) (Spanish: conspiración de los tres Antonios) was a minor failed conspiracy against the Spanish colonial authorities in the captaincy-general of Chile, that was led by two Frenchmen, Antoine Gramusset and Antoine-Alexandre Berney, and a criollo, José Antonio de Rojas. It was so named because all three conspirators shared the same first name.

== Events ==
In 1780, Antonio Berney was a Frenchman living in Santiago where he worked as a teacher of Latin and Mathematics. He was a constant reader of the Encyclopédie, and inspired by the Enlightenment ideals he formulated a plan to establish Chile as an independent republic. He converted Antonio Gramusset, another Frenchman living in Chile to his ideas, and he in turn enlisted the aid of one of Chile's most prominent citizens, José Antonio de Rojas.

The idea of the three revolutionaries was to set up a republican government based on an inclusive electoral process. Social classes were to be eliminated and slavery abolished, according to a plan that actually anticipated nineteenth-century socialism. An ambitious program of agrarian reform was included in their plans, along with a broad policy of free trade with the world at large. Nearly a decade before the French Revolution, the three Antonios conjured up one of the most democratic conspiracies in the Spanish Empire.

=== Discovery and trial ===
During a trip to a nearby town Gramusset lost his valise which contained detailed plans of their conspiracy. The valise was actually found and returned to the local policemen (Spanish: Serenos) who, because they could not read were unable to identify the owner, forwarded it to their headquarters in Santiago. Once the documents were in the hands of the authorities they quickly led to the discovery of the plotters who were secretly arrested at night during new year's on January 1, 1781.

Berney and Gramusset were rapidly shipped to Peru to be tried in the viceregal courts, while Rojas, because of his high social standing in Chile managed to avoid prison for a while. The Frenchmen were treated with utmost courtesy and after a year of imprisonment in Lima were shipped to Spain to be tried there. The San Pedro de Alcantara that was carrying them sank off the coast of Portugal during a storm, and Berney drowned while Gramusset managed to survive only to die three months later as a consequence of the exposure.

Meanwhile Rojas, after a short exile in Spain, returned to Chile. He was arrested again in 1809 under suspicions of plotting to bring down the government but this time without any proof. His arrest hastened the downfall of the Royal Governor Francisco Garcia Carrasco who ordered the arrest and was one of the detonants of the Chilean independence movement.

== See also ==
- History of Chile
- Chilean War of Independence
- List of Chilean coups d'état
