= Marquess of La Pica =

The title Marquess de la Pica is a Spanish title bestowed upon Francisco Bravo de Saravia on July 8, 1684 by King Charles II of Spain.

== List of holders ==
- Francisco Bravo de Saravia Ovalle, 1st Marquess of la Pica
- Marcela Bravo de Saravia Iturrizara, 2nd Marchioness of la Pica
- Miguel de Irarrázaval y Bravo de Saravia, 3rd Marquess of la Pica
- José Santiago de Irarrázaval y Portales, 4th Marquess of la Pica
- Fernando Irarrázaval Mackenna, 5th Marquess of la Pica
- Fernando Irarrázaval Fernández, 6th Marquess of la Pica
- Francisco Irarrázaval Fernández, 7th Marquess of la Pica
- Francisco Irarrázaval Mackenna, 8th Marquess of la Pica
- Fernando Mario Eduardo Irarrázaval Eyzaguirre, 9th Marquess of la Pica
