= Ayllicuriche =

17th-century Mapuche Toqui

Ayllicuriche or Huaillacuriche was a Mapuche Toqui, holding that command from 1672 to his death in 1673. In 1672, Ayllicuriche and other Mapuche leaders attempted a revolt to resist the terms of an earlier treaty that put Spanish officials in authority over the Mapuche. However he did not get much support and the revolt was quickly crushed.

== Sources ==
- Juan Ignatius Molina, The Geographical, Natural, and Civil History of Chili, Vol II., Longman, Hurst, Rees, and Orme, London, 1809
- José Ignacio Víctor Eyzaguirre, Historia eclesiastica: Politica y literaria de Chile, IMPRENTA DEL COMERCIO, VALPARAISO, June 1830 List of Toquis, pg. 162-163, 498-500.
