= Parliament of Negrete (1726) =

Peace discussion between Spanish authorities and the Mapuche in colonial Chile

The 1726 Parliament of Negrete was a diplomatic meeting between Mapuches and Spanish authorities held in Negrete (a town in present-day Chile). During the parliament a peace treaty was signed, bringing an end to a period of warfare that begun in with the Mapuche uprising of 1723.
