= Vicente Carvallo y Goyeneche =

Vicente Carvallo y Goyeneche (1742–1816) was a Chilean soldier, author and historian of Basque descent, born in Valdivia. Author of the Descripcion Histórico Geografía del Reino de Chile, covering the history and geography of the Captaincy General of Chile from the beginning of the Spanish conquest to 1789. The book remained unpublished for eighty years, until it was published between 1875 and 1876 by José Toribio Medina. The text is divided in two sections. In the first Carvallo narrates events beginning with the Conquest of Chile up to the year 1789. The second section consists of a description of all the provinces of the country and the customs of the Mapuche. It was published in three parts, the last in 1876.

== See also ==
- History of Chile

== Sources ==
- Vicente Carvallo y Goyeneche, Descripcion Histórico Geografía del Reino de Chile (Description Historical Geography of the Kingdom of Chile), PDF E Libros from Memoria Chilena (History of Chile 1542-1788)
  - Tomo I History 1542 - 1626, Tomo 8 de Colección de historiadores de Chile y de documentos relativos a la historia nacional. Santiago : Impr. del Ferrocarril, 1861. also copy at HathiTrust (US access only)
  - Tomo II History 1626 - 1787, Tomo 9 de Colección de historiadores de Chile y de documentos relativos a la historia nacional. Santiago : Impr. del Ferrocarril, 1861. also copy at HathiTrust (US access only)
  - Tomo III Geographical Description of Chile, al Tomo 10 de Colección de historiadores de Chile y de documentos relativos a la historia nacional. Santiago : Impr. del Ferrocarril, 1861
