= José Toribio Medina =

Chilean bibliographer, prolific writer, and historian (1852–1930)

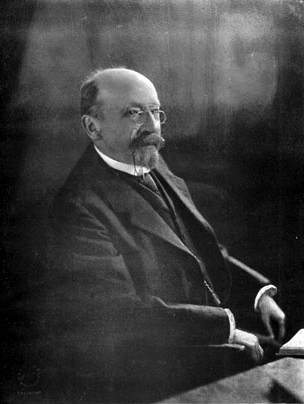
José Toribio Medina in 1918

José Toribio Medina Zavala (Spanish pronunciation: [xoˈse toˈɾiβjo meˈðina]; October 21, 1852 - December 11, 1930) was a Chilean bibliographer, prolific writer, and historian. He is renowned for his study of colonial literature in Chile, printing in Spanish America and large bibliographies such as the Biblioteca Hispano-Americana. (7 Vol., 1898-1907.)

== Biography ==
Jose Toribio Medina was born in Santiago, Chile. He was the eldest son of José del Pilar Medina y Valderrama and Mariana Zavala y Almeida, a woman of Basque descent. His father was a lawyer, and he discouraged Medina from bibliographic studies in favor of a more practical career. He was constantly traveling due to his position as a magistrate, and Medina spent his childhood moving between cities including Santiago, Talca, and Valparaiso. At the age of thirteen, he returned to Santiago to support his father who had lost the use of his legs. Later on, Medina joined the Instituto Nacional General José Miguel Carrera under the direction of the great historian Diego Barros Arana. Later he studied law at the University of Chile, graduating as a lawyer on March 26, 1873. His first publication, while a very young man, was a metrical translation of Henry Wadsworth Longfellow's Evangeline. At twenty-two he was appointed the secretary to the legation at Lima, Peru. After his return, he published a history of Chilean literature (1878), and a work upon the aboriginal tribes (1884). In 1879, he contributed to Chile's war effort against Peru and Bolivia with the invention of an improved manufacturing method of cartridges. He was appointed military judge of Tarapacá in 1880 as a result of his efforts.

In this latter year, he was appointed the secretary of legation in Spain, and availed himself of the opportunity of examining the treasures of the old Spanish libraries. These researches, repeated on subsequent visits to Spain, and also to France and England, enriched him with a mass of historical and bibliographical material. Among his publications may be mentioned the Biblioteca hispano-americana, a remarkable catalogue of unedited documents relating to the Spanish discovery and colonization of Chile, including a number of articles from Martín Fernández de Navarette. Volumes II and III of this collection focus on Ferdinand Magellan, from where the recorded history of Chile starts. Other works include the similar Biblioteca hispano-chilena which commenced in 1897; the standard and magnificent history of printing in the La Plata countries (1892); comprehensive works on the Inquisition in Chile, Peru and the Philippines; and the standard treatise on South American medals (1899). Medina worked extensively to acquire and publish bibliographic documents printed in Lima, Mexico, and Manila, including books, memoirs, and other historic documents. At this time, Medina's work was the most extensive existing effort toward documenting the literary history and bibliography of the Spanish colonies. He was designated "Humanist of the Americas" by members of the Pan American Union.

Prior to his death, Medina offered his personal library collection to the National Library of Chile (Biblioteca Nacional de Chile), which contained 30,000 rare books and 500 volumes of documents dated prior to the independence of Latin American nations. The collection is held in the Medina Room. Before donating his collection to the National Library, he was offered it for purchase many times. One offer was for half a million dollars, but he decided it was best to "leave it to his own people."

Medina was married to Mercedes Ibáñez de Medina, who assisted with much of his work. She is credited with making bibliographical cards, reading proof, and conducting other "intellectual drudgery" for his works.

== Exhaustive study of Magellan ==
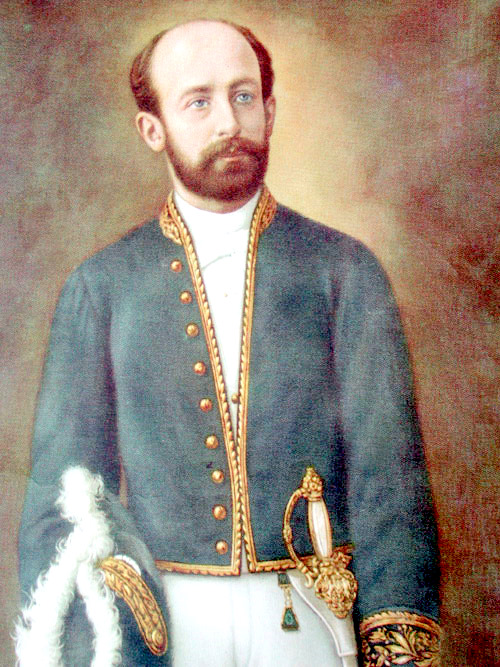
Portrait of José Toribio Medina by Francisco Tristán, 1886

In 1920, Medina published a comprehensive study of Ferdinand Magellan containing an impressive amount of biographical information, a detailed analysis of the beginning and development of the voyage of circumnavigation, and a remarkable amount of information on the crews of the Armada de Molucca. This contained a priceless list of documentary sources and an extensive bibliography. The work is titled, El Descubrimiento del Oceano Pacifico: Vasco Nuñez, Balboa, Hernando de Magallanes y Sus Compañeros. In the words of Tim Joyner, "Any serious study of Magellan and his enterprise must include this informative product of Medina's exhaustive archival research."

== Additional works ==
Medina was the author, editor, and translator of approximately 282 titles (books, pamphlets, and articles). This number exceeds 350 if additional works are included, such as re-editions, sections of books, posthumous studies, or pre-prints and re-prints of complete or partial works.

Some of his published books from 1882 to 1927 include:

- 1882: Los Aborigenes de Chile. Santiago de Chile: Imprenta Gutenberg.
- 1887: Historia del Tribunal del Santo Oficio de la inquisición de Lima (1569-1820). Santiago de Chile: Imprenta Gutenberg.
- 1904: La imprenta en La Habana (1707-1810). Santiago de Chile: Imprenta Elzeviriana.
- 1904: La imprenta en Lima (1584-1824). Santiago de Chile: Impreso y grabado en casa del autor.
- 1904: La imprenta en Cartagena de las Indias (1809-1820): Notas bibliográficas. Santiago de Chile: Imprenta Elzeviriana.
- 1904: La imprenta en Manila desde sus origenes hasta 1810. Santiago de Chile: Impreso y grabado en casa del autor.
- 1904: La imprenta en en [sic] Quito (1760-1818): Notas bibliográficas. Santiago de Chile: Imprenta Elzeviriana.
- 1906: Diccionario biográfico colonial de Chile. Santiago de Chile: Impr. Elzeviriana.
- 1908: El veneciano Sebastián Caboto: Al servicio de España y especialmente de su proyectado viaje á las Molucas por el Estrecho de Magallanes y al reconocimiento de la costa del continente hasta la gobernación de Pedrarias Dávila. Santiago de Chile: Impr. y encuadernación universitaria.
- 1908: Los restos indígenas de Pichilemu. Santiago de Chile: Imprenta Cervantes.
- 1910: La imprenta en Guatemala (1660-1821). Santiago de Chile: Impreso en casa del autor.
- 1913: El descubrimiento del Océano pacífico: Vasco Núñez de Balboa, Hernando de Magallanes y sus compañeros. Santiago de Chile: Imprenta universitaria.
- 1923: La literatura femenina en Chile: (notas bibliográficas y en parte críticas). Santiago de Chile: Imprenta universitaria.
- 1927: En defensa de siete voces chilenas registradas en el Diccionario de la Real Academia Española y cuya supresión se solicita por un autor nacional. Santiago de Chile: Editorial Nascimento.

== See also ==
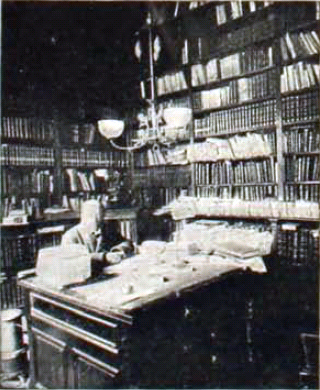
José Toribio Medina in 1909

- Maury A. Bromsen
- José Toribio Medina Award The executive board of the Seminar on the Acquisition of Latin American Library Materials (SALALM) established in 1981 the José Toribio Medina Award, to be made annually, if merited, in recognition of outstanding contributions by SALALM members to Latin American Studies. https://web.archive.org/web/20140329231941/http://salalm.org/about/scholarships-and-awards/jose-toribio-medina-award/
- La Biblioteca Americana José Toribio Medina In el Portal de Cultura de Chile. http://www.memoriachilena.cl/temas/index.asp?id_ut=labibliotecaamericanadejosetoribiomedina
- "Una Experiencia Bibliográfica: José Toribio Medina y Su Imprenta En La Puebla Colonial." Bibliographica 2, no. 1 (2019): 163–96.
