= Miria Contreras =

Chilean secretary and gallerist (1927–2002)

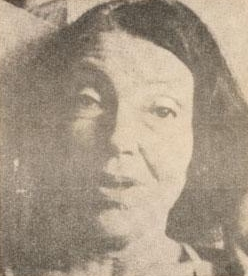
- Image of Contreras used on an anti-Allende propaganda pamphlet during the dictatorship
- Born: Miria Orea Contreras Bell; 28 April 1927; Taltal, Chile
- Died: 22 November 2002 (aged 75); Santiago, Chile
- Spouse: Andrés Enrique Ropert Gallet (div. 1970)
- Partner: Salvador Allende (died 1973)
- Children: 3

Miria "Payita" Orea Contreras Bell (28 April 1927 – 22 November 2002) was a Chilean secretary and gallerist, known for being the private secretary and mistress of Salvador Allende. Following the 1973 coup d'état, Contreras received political asylum in Cuba and worked as the director of the Museo de la Solidaridad Salvador Allende secretariat in exile.

== Early life and family ==
Contreras was born on 28 April 1927 (Note: Also cited 1928.) in Taltal to José Angel Contreras, a lawyer, and was educated at a German convent school in Bellavista, Santiago.

Contreras was married to Andrés Enrique Ropert Gallet (Note: Francized as Andre Henry Ropert-Gallet.) (1912–2013), an engineer, with whom she had three children. Contreras' sister, Lina Contreras Bell, was previously married to the painter Pablo Burchard Aguayo.

== Career ==
In 1958, Contreras and Ropert bought a house in Providencia, Santiago. The house was close to the Allende family home, the Casa de Guardia Vieja 392, and the two families became friends. From c. 1961 to 1964, the Contreras family lived in France whilst Ropert was studying nuclear physics in Paris. Upon their return to Chile, Contreras and Ropert ran structural mechanics workshop and became involved in Allende's 1964 presidential campaign. Despite her involvement in Allende's campaign, Contreras never joined any political party or group but was staunch leftist.

In 1968, Contreras took over the running of the Patio Gallery (Spanish: Galería El Patio) from her sister Lina. Contreras gradually became Allende's personal assistant and In 1970 became part of Allende's personal presidential election campaign team. Upon Allende winning the presidency, Contreras found and proposed that the State purchase the Casa presidencial de Tomás Moro as Allende's presidential residence. Contreras moved to Casa El Cañaveral, where Allende spent his weekends.

Contreras became a member of Allende's inner circle along with Víctor Pey and Beatriz Allende, with whom she shared an office with at the La Moneda Palace. During this period Contreras helped administer the Museo de la Solidaridad Salvador Allende.

=== 1973 coup d'état ===
On 11 September 1973, alerted to the outbreak of the coup, Contreras left the Casa El Cañaveral accompanied by her son Enrique Ropert Contreras, an economics student and member of the Socialist Party, for the presidential residence. However, upon arriving Contreras learnt that Allende had already left for the La Moneda. Ordering 10 members of the Group of Personal Friends (GAP), including the head of the GAP Domingo Blanco Tarrés, to accompany her in an adjoining car; Contreras traveled to the La Moneda with her son and ex-husband. Arriving at Morandé 80, the side entrance of La Moneda, Contreras quickly exited her car.

Soon after both Contreras' and the GAP's car were surrounded by coupist members of the Carabineros de Chile led by the Lieutenants José Martínez Maureira and Patricio de la Fuente. The occupants of the two cars, including Enrique, were arrested and taken to the Regional Government building. Unable to stop the arrests, Contreras entered the presidential garage where she contacted the Palace. Eduardo Paredes Barrientos, the Director General of the Chilean Investigative Police, asked Contreras to join the President and General José María Sepúlveda, the Director General of the Carabineros, in Allende's office. Meeting with Allende and Sepúlveda, Contreras requested that her son and the GAP members were released. Contreras left La Moneda with General Urrutia (Note: Also cited as General José María Sepúlveda.), the Carabineros second in command, who ordered the coupist Carabineros for Enquire's and the GAP members release. However, the coupist Carabineros refused.

When the Allende called for a truce in order for the women in La Moneda to be allowed to leave, Contreras refused as she wanted to died near Allende and her son. During the assault on the Palace, Contreras witnessed the suicide of Augusto Olivares. Later arrested alongside the other survivors of La Moneda, Contreras was recognised by Jaime Puccio, the dentist for both the Army and the Palace, who claimed that Contreras' was injured and ordered her to be put in an ambulance. At the hospital Contreras received help from Álvaro Reyes, who hid her at his girlfriend's house until she was able to contact clandestine networks. Contreras was later able to seek asylum at the former Cuban embassy, which was under the protection of Sweden and Ambassador Harald Edelstam. Contreras' son Enrique was tortured before being shot under the Bulnes Bridge on either the night of 19 September or the morning of 20 September.

== Exile ==
On 29 May 1974, Contreras was able to escape to Stockholm, Sweden and four months later was able to relocate to Havana, Cuba. In Havana, the Cuban authorities provided Contreras and her son, Max, with an apartment and she began working for Havanatur.

From 1975 onwards, Contreras worked as the director of the Museo de la Solidaridad Salvador Allende secretariat in exile, and was the driving force behind the museum project in exile.

On 22 November 2002 Contreras died in Santiago, aged 75.

== Legacy ==
In 2023, Contreras was portrayed by Francisca Gavilán in the miniseries Los mil días de Allende.
