= Ximena Armas =

Chilean painter, drawer and lithographer (born 1946)

- Ximena Armas in 2006
- Born: Marta Ximena Armas Fernández; 29 July 1946 (age 80); Santiago, Chile
- Education: University of Chile; Pontifical Catholic University of Chile, 1969; École nationale supérieure des arts décoratifs, 1974; Beaux-Arts de Paris, 1974
- Occupations: Painter; drawer; lithographer
- Spouse: Henri Richelet (m. 1975; died 2020)
- Website: ximena.armas.free.fr; x.armas.free.fr; ximena.armas.2.free.fr/

Marta Ximena Armas Fernández (born 29 July 1946) is a Chilean painter, drawer and lithographer active in France. Inspired by narrative figuration, her works depict a dreamlike world characterized by feathers, palm fronds, drapery, sandy coastlines, and stenciled silhouettes.

== Biography ==
Armas was born Marta Ximena Armas Fernández on 29 July 1946 in Santiago, Chile. She studied for a year at the Arts Faculty of the University of Chile. From 1965 to 1969, she studied painting, graphic design, and film at the Pontifical Catholic University of Chile under Mario Carreño, Eduardo Vilches, and Mario Toral.

Awarded a scholarship by the French government in 1970, she settled in Paris the following year. She studied mural painting under Georges Rohner and Jacques Despierre at the École nationale supérieure des arts décoratifs, and painting and lithography at the Beaux-Arts de Paris from 1971 to 1974. Armas was married to the French painter Henri Richelet.

Since 1969, she has participated in numerous group and solo exhibitions in Chile, France, Spain, and Mexico. Works by Armas are held at the Chilean National Museum of Fine Arts, Museo de la Solidaridad Salvador Allende, University of Talca, Museo de Arte Contemporáneo Julio Cortázar, and other museums.

== Style and expression ==
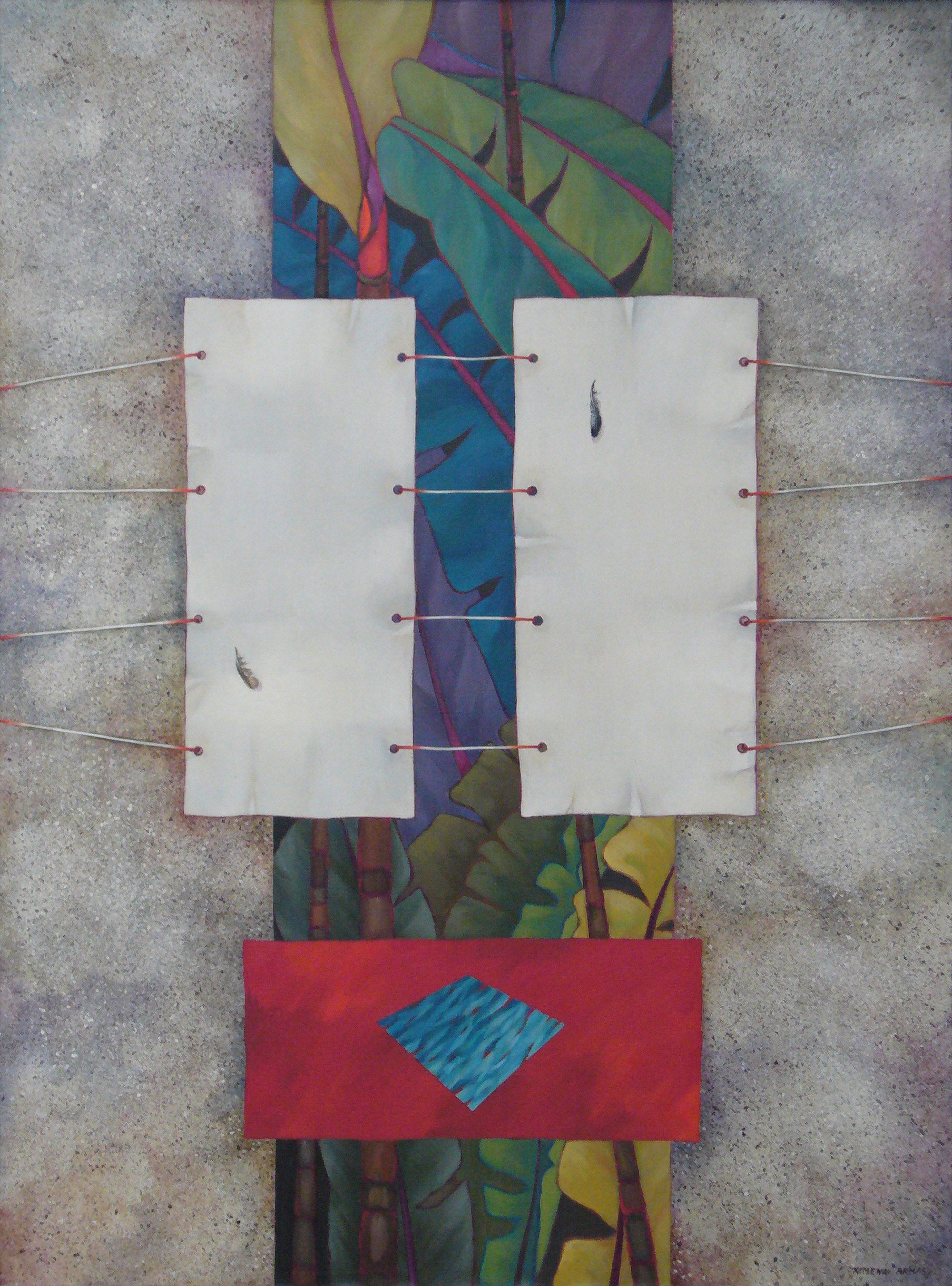
Secrets, by Ximena Armas (2007).

For Armas, birds are primary victims of the outrage perpetrated against nature. Their feathers are scattered across her drawings, pastels and acrylics, and one cannot help but seek out their traces from one work to the next. She employs a deliberately limited figurative vocabulary whose various elements are endlessly combined: sandy, deserted coastlines; pebbles; parasols; secluded canvas pavilions; palm fronds frozen in the wind; and feathers that will never again take their flight. Fabrics, scarves, and cords—white, striped, or streaked, and sometimes featuring sharply contrasting colors—are used as leitmotives. Figures, often faceless and gagged with ribbons, gaze at one another in vain.

She also organizes space around unusual architectural layouts and distinctive perspectives. In her timeless landscapes, the stately stillness of stone and desert responds in counterpoint to the mirroring waters and the rustling of palm fronds and wild grasses. This interplay between architecture and nature provides mysterious enigmas, as shown for instance by her painting Secrets, used here as an illustration. She seems to delight in staging a dreamlike universe that blends memory with dreams, secret emotions with fragments of recollection, and nostalgia with hope. Her work has at times been linked to post-surrealism or narrative figuration. However, as she herself puts it: "I do not belong to any movement."

== Works in museum collections ==
- Chilean National Museum of Fine Arts, Santiago, Chile:

Profonde solitude: acrylic painting on canvas (130 × 97 cm)

- Museo de la Solidaridad Salvador Allende, Santiago, Chile:

Ensueños: acrylic painting on canvas (130 × 97 cm)
Golpe: Indian ink drawing and collage (60 × 40 cm)

- National Museum Julio Cortázar, Managua, Nicaragua:

No toques: acrylic painting on canvas (100 × 81 cm)

- Santiago Museum of Contemporary Art, Chile:

Nuestro tiempo: acrylic painting on canvas (130 × 97 cm)

- Pinacotheca of the University of Talca, Chile:

Pasan huyendo pájaros: acrylic painting on canvas (196 × 114 cm)

- Pinacotheca of the University of Concepción, Chile:

Humanos en caja: oil painting on canvas (120 × 80 cm)

- Museo Ralli, Santiago, Chile:

Le Pont: acrylic painting on canvas (130 × 97 cm)

== Exhibitions ==
=== Solo exhibitions ===
- 1969: Galería Arturo Edwards, Santiago, Chile
- 1970: Galería C.C. Providencia, Santiago, Chile
- 1980: Galerie La Bolée, Anonnay, France
- 1982: "Latino-Américains à Paris", Grand Palais, Paris
- 1986: Galerie Lefor Openo, Saint-Cloud, France
- 1987:

Espace latino-américain, Paris
Galerie de la Main de fer, Perpignan, France

- 1990:

Galería La Fachada, Santiago, Chile
Galerie Ceibo, Paris

- 1994: Galería Arte Actual, Santiago, Chile
- 1996: Town Hall, Neufchâteau, France
- 1999: Galería Arte Actual, Santiago, Chile
- 2001: Museo Nacional de Bellas Artes, Santiago, Chile
- 2003: Musée Roybet-Fould, Courbevoie, France
- 2006:

Galería Modigliani, Viña del Mar, Chile
Galería Praxis, Santiago, Chile

- 2007–2008: Le Trait d'Union, Neufchâteau, France
- 2012: Centre culturel du ministère des Finances, Paris
- 2015: Galería Extensión, Universidad de Talca, Santiago, Chile
- 2017:

Espace7, Paris
Centre culturel du ministère des Finances, Paris

=== Main group exhibitions ===
- 1969: "Prix Crav de Peinture", Museo de Arte Contemporáneo, Santiago, Chile
- 1972: "La Peinture chilienne", UNESCO, Paris
- 1974: "Grafic 74", Museo de Arte Contemporáneo, Ibiza, Spain
- 1981:

"Art pour le Nicaragua", Musée d'Art Moderne, Paris
"Cent gravures contemporaines", Maison de la Culture, Aulnay-sous-Bois

- 1982: "Chili Vivant", Mexico
- 1983: "Chili-femmes", Espace latino-américain, Paris
- 1984: "Peintres latino-américains", Monaco
- 1986: "Les Figurations de 1960 à nos jours", Musée de Cagnes-sur-Mer, École des beaux-arts de Besançon, Musée de Carcassonne, Couvent des Cordeliers de Châteauroux, France
- 1989: Musée de l'Amérique latine, Monaco
- 1990: "Art chilien d'aujourd'hui", Espace Belleville and UNESCO, Paris
- 1991: "Festival international de la peinture", Château-musée de Cagnes-sur-Mer, France
- 1995:

"Femmes ibéro-américaines", Junta de Extramadura, Caceres, Spain
"Présence du Chili en France", Galería Plastica Nueva, Santiago, Chile

- 1996: "Artistes Chiliens en France", Museo de Arte Contemporáneo, Santiago, Chile
- 1997:

"Festival des arts 1997 – Dialogue Est-Ouest", Vayolles, Vienne, France
"Persistance du paysage dans la peinture chilienne", Museo de Arte Contemporáneo, Santiago, Chile

- 2003: "Hommage à S. Allende", Centre culturel Robert-Desnos, Ris-Orangis, France
- 2004: "George Sand, interprétations", Couvent des Cordeliers, Châteauroux, France
- 2007: "Santiago Paris Santiago", Galería La Ventana Cemicual, Santiago, Chile
- 2022-2023: "58th Carnegie International", Carnegie Museum of Art, Pittsburgh, U.S.A.

== See also ==
- Post-surrealism
