= The Blunder of a Horse =

- Genres: folk jazz, process, microtonal
- Years active: 2011–present

The Blunder of a Horse is an improvising ensemble of contemporary microtonal folk jazz based in Strasbourg, France, with compositions and settings heavily invested in sound art, psychedelia, electroacoustic and process music. Active since the year 2011, the ensemble has released three full-length albums since, and is led by Arian Bagheri Pour Fallah and Ashkan Zareie.

== Beginnings, The Irrationalist and Mystery Manta ==
After original establishment in 2011 by ethnographer-composer Arian Bagheri Pour Fallah, the ensemble debuted in the year 2013 with multi-instrumentalist Ashkan Zareie as the second director the record The Irrationalist, viewed by Rest Art as "dissociative in nature," comparable in its free improvisation roots to the works of Tim Hodgkinson's Konk Pack and aligned structurally along the atonal trajectory of the likes of "Stockhausen."

The Irrationalist was soon followed by a second album in the year 2014. In his review of the ensemble's 2014 follow-up, Mystery Manta, for Sputnikmusic, staff critic Tristan Jones described the album as "an impressive feat in sonically diverse improvisation, with odes to exploration and no safety lines." He noted that despite lack of a "conventional structure" as with "Faust-esque krautrock" and "expressionist" music, The Blunder Of A Horse followed "terrifying" narratives "heightened by the element of surprise, mixing sparse time signatures with drastic changes in sound," characteristics unique to film and incidental music. Mystery Manta was "recommended" by Avant Music News, and included in the best albums of 2014 by Noise/Admiration and Holy Grail from Hell respectively.

== Zoantrophi, Methodology and Mythology ==
In 2015, The Blunder Of A Horse released a third album, Zoantrophi. The Modern Folk Music of America "highly recommended" the record as "an exploration of world folk through a psychedelic lens" while We Need No Swords concluded "Zoantrophi channels that particular strain of psychedelia that Jhonn Balance and Sleazy Christopherson made their own, but twisting their mordant lyricism into the more abstract, sinewy forms familiar to anyone versed in the Emanem or Incus discographies."

Emphasis was put on both methodology and mythology of the ensemble in reviews of the album, whereby entheoges, "Appalachia" and several Austronesian, Celtic and Welsh sources were recognized and elaborated on. The greater part of these remain reputed when viewed with the largely humanities-centered liner notes in mind. The liner notes of the album, having in the past included excerpts from Blanchot and Bataille, quote a passage from A Thousand Plateaus, in Zoantrophi. Furthermore, the composition Richeleneblom was dedicated to French erotic artist and etcher Henri Richelet and painter Rickard Eneblom.

== Instrumentation ==
The Blunder Of A Horse is known for wide-ranging, maximal instrumentation comprising a range of aerophones and prepared string instruments.

== Origin ==
The origins of the ensemble remain disputed to date, with Exposé Online and The Modern Folk Music of America listing "United States" and Sputnikmusic, "the Republic of Palau," as place of origin. The ensemble's own web page however points to Strasbourg, France as the place of origin.
