= Henri Richelet =

French painter (1944–2020)

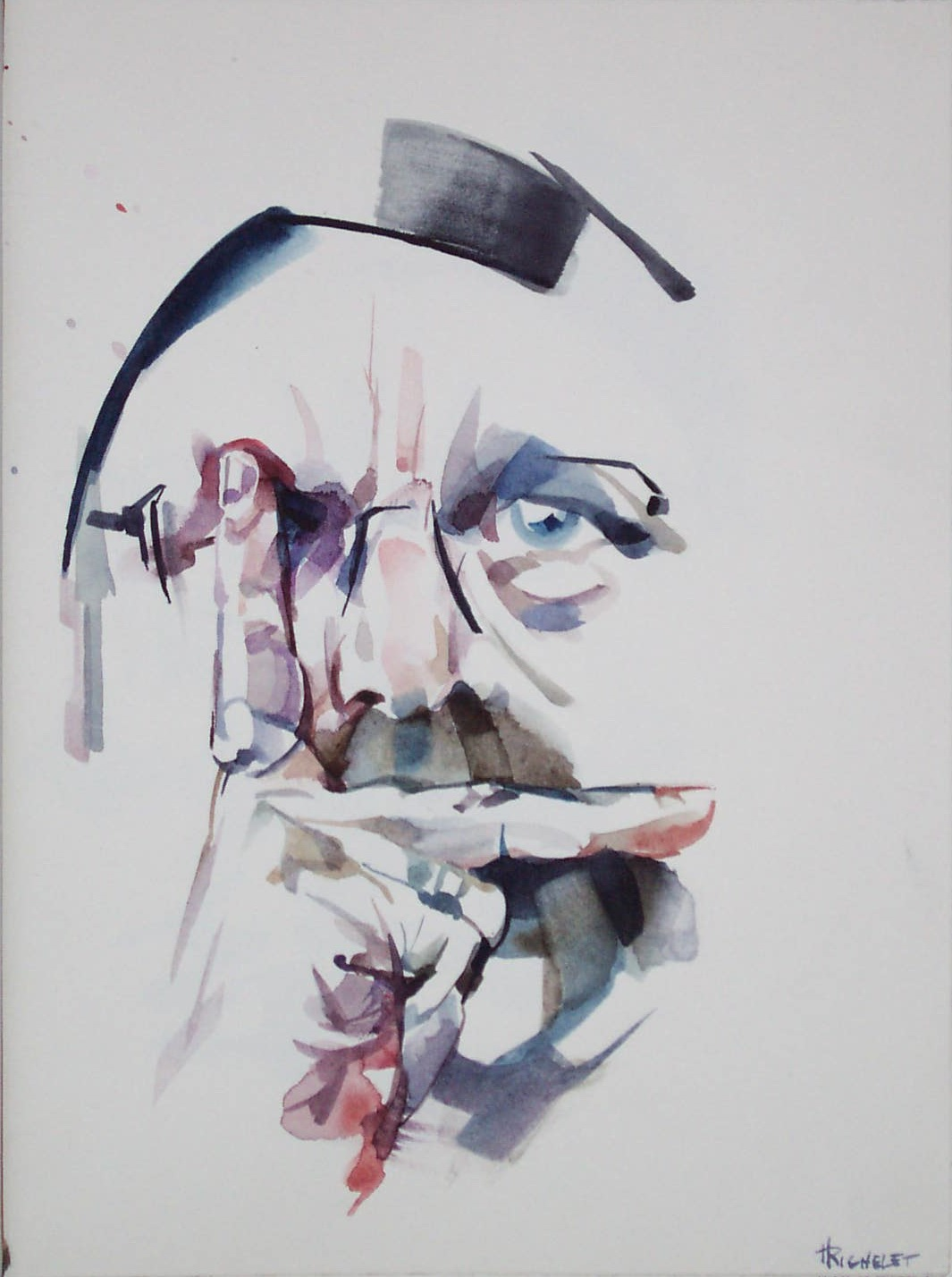
- Self-portrait by Henri Richelet.
- Born: 16 June 1944; Frebécourt (Vosges), France
- Died: 18 March 2020 (aged 75); Paris, France
- Education: École nationale supérieure des Beaux-Arts de Paris
- Occupation: Painter
- Spouse: Ximena Armas
- Awards: First Grand Prix of the Casa de Velázquez, Madrid, 1968 (etching category)
- Website: henri.richelet.free.fr

Henri Richelet (16 June 1944 – 18 March 2020) was a French painter.

== Early life and education ==
Born to primary school teachers in a small village close to Domrémy, the birthplace of Joan of Arc, Richelet spent his childhood and adolescence in the neighbouring small town of Neufchâteau (Vosges). After his baccalauréat, he first attended the École des Beaux-Art in Nancy, then the École nationale supérieure des Beaux-Arts (Beaux-Arts de Paris) in Paris.

== Career ==
In 1968, Richelet was awarded the First Grand Prix of the Casa de Velázquez, a French school in Madrid, in the etching category.

Besides his participation in group exhibitions since 1963, Richelet made numerous solo exhibitions between 1965 and 2007 in France, Quebec and Chile. He also regularly took part in several salons, including: Salon d'Automne, Salon de Mai, Salon Comparaisons, Salon Grands et jeunes d’aujourd’hui, Salon de Boulogne-Billancourt, Salon d'art contemporain de Montrouge, Salon Figuration critique.

== Oeuvre ==
Richelet's provocative humour made him choose gloomy colours. Following the tradition of Caravaggio, or of Georges de La Tour in his Saint Jérôme pénitent, he used dark backgrounds to make livid and pallid flesh of tense, hunched up bodies stand out. ″Vanitas vanitatum, omnia vanitas,″ he was fond of reminding us. This apophthegm haunts many works of Richelet, where his obsession with sex and death is expressed by a parallel between impotence and incapacity to create. One can be surprised, in some of his canvases, by the warm vermilion of a drape, a borrowing which would not have been renounced by the two old masters he so admired. Energetic lines in Richelet's paintings, drawings, and etchings oddly bring corpses, broken and mutilated in their physical beauty, on the verge of death.

=== Works in museum collections ===
- Museo Nacional Centro de Arte Reina Sofía, Madrid:
  - Coucou !: etching, resin (50 × 64 cm)
  - Duo en trois mouvements: etching, resin (50 × 32 cm)
- Museo Nacional de Bellas Artes, Santiago, Chile:
  - Ne pas toucher: Indian ink on paper (51 × 60 cm)
- Museo de la Solidaridad Salvador Allende, Santiago, Chile:
  - Derniers outrages: oil painting on canvas (100 × 81 cm)

=== Exhibitions ===
==== Solo exhibitions ====
- 1965: Casino de Contrexéville, Contrexéville, France
- 1968: Maison des Beaux-Arts, Paris
- 1971:
  - Galerie Beaudelaire, Quebec
  - Galerie Chantauteuil, Quebec
- 1974: Galerie L’Art du Monde, Paris
- 1976: Galerie L'Estuaire, Honfleur, France
- 1990: Galerie Ceibo, Paris
- 1996: Town Hall, Neufchâteau, France
- 1998: Galerie Thermale, Contrexéville, France
- 1999: Galería Modigliani, Viña del Mar, Chile
- 2001:
  - Musée Roybet–Fould, Courbevoie, France
  - Galerie Aux créations du possible, Paris
  - Museo Nacional de Bellas Artes (Chilean National Museum of Fine Arts), Santiago, Chile
- 2006: Galería Modigliani, Viña del Mar, Chile
- 2007: Le Trait d’Union, Neufchâteau, France

==== Main group exhibitions ====
- 1969 & 1970:
  - Casa de Velázquez, Madrid
  - Salle Comtesse de Caen, Institut de France, Paris.
- 1977–1978: La Boîte, ARC 2, Musée d'Art Moderne, Paris
- 1981: Cent gravures contemporaines, Aulnay-sous-Bois, France
- 1982 & 1987:
  - Casa de Velázquez, Madrid
  - Salle Comtesse de Caen, Institut de France, Paris
- 1991: Art contemporain international, Château de la Bonnetière, Haut-Poitou, France
- 1996: 3^{e} Festival de l’art actuel, Château d’O, Orne, France
- 1997: Dialogue Est-Ouest art festival, Vayolles, France
- 2000: Variations, Espace Belleville, Paris
- 2003: Hommage à S. Allende, Ris-Orangis, France
- 2004: George Sand, interprétations, Couvent des Cordeliers, Châteauroux, France

== Personal life ==
He had been living in Paris since the 1970s, after having spent a few years in Quebec. He was married to the Chilean painter Ximena Armas.

=== Death ===
During the COVID-19 pandemic, Richelet died from COVID-19 on 18 March 2020 in Paris, aged 75. He is one of the very first notable people who died in France at the outbreak of the pandemic.

== See also ==
- List of people from Quebec
- List of French painters
- List of printmakers

== Bibliography ==
- Xuriguera, Gérard [in French] (1985). Les Figurations de 1960 à nos jours (in French). Paris: éditions Mayer.
- Xuriguera, Gérard (1987). Le Dessin, le pastel, l'aquarelle dans l'art contemporain (in French). Paris: éditions Mayer. ISBN 2-85299-004-0.
- Anonymous (1993). Paris 13^{e} : l'Art sous toutes ses formes (in French). Paris: éditions Fus-Art.
- Anonymous (1996). CD-ROM Art Présent : Rencontre avec les artistes vivant et travaillant en France (in French). Paris: éditions J.F.J.
- Anonymous (1996). Grand annuaire des arts sur CD-ROM (in French). Paris: éditions France Art.
- Dumas, Julien (2016). Artfabetic : Dictionnaire biographique des artistes plasticiens de France (tome 1) (in French). Perpignan: Association Concordia Patrimoine et Culture. ISBN 978-2-7466-8324-2.
