= Lawrence A. Corcoran =

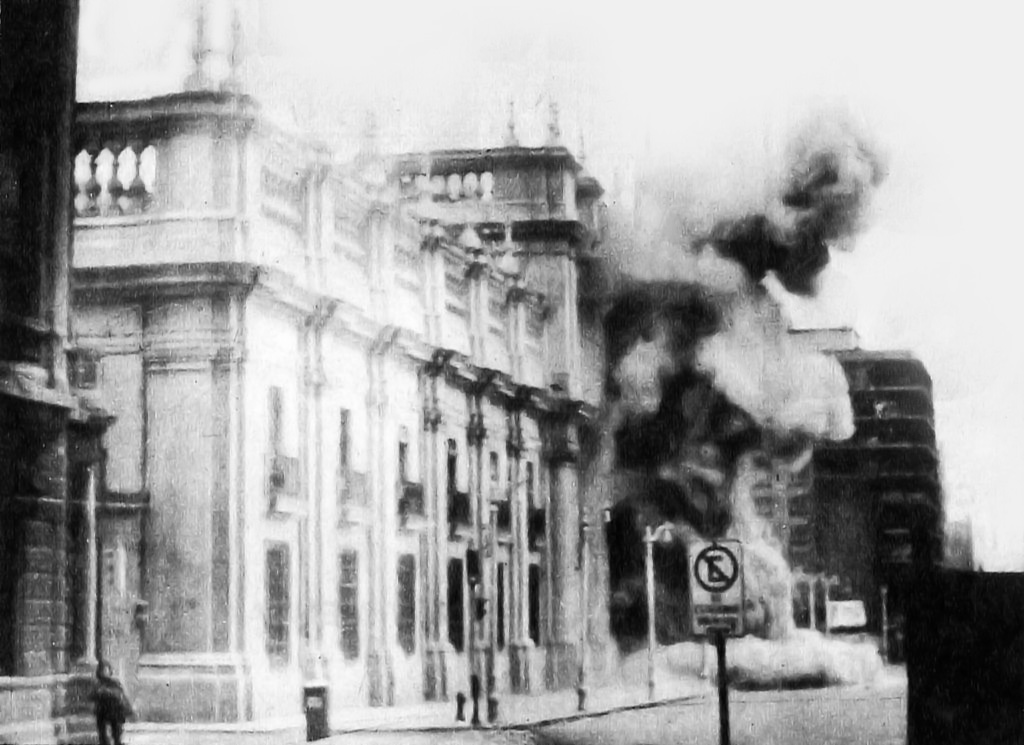
The Bombing of La Moneda on 11 September 1973 by the Junta's Armed Forces.

Colonel Lawrence Arthur Corcoran (1931 – July 15, 2014) was a Defense Intelligence Agency officer stationed in Santiago, Chile in the early 1970s.

Corcoran was born in 1931 in Cambridge, Massachusetts. He died on July 15, 2014, in Fredericksburg, Virginia.
