= Morandé 80 =

Chilean street address

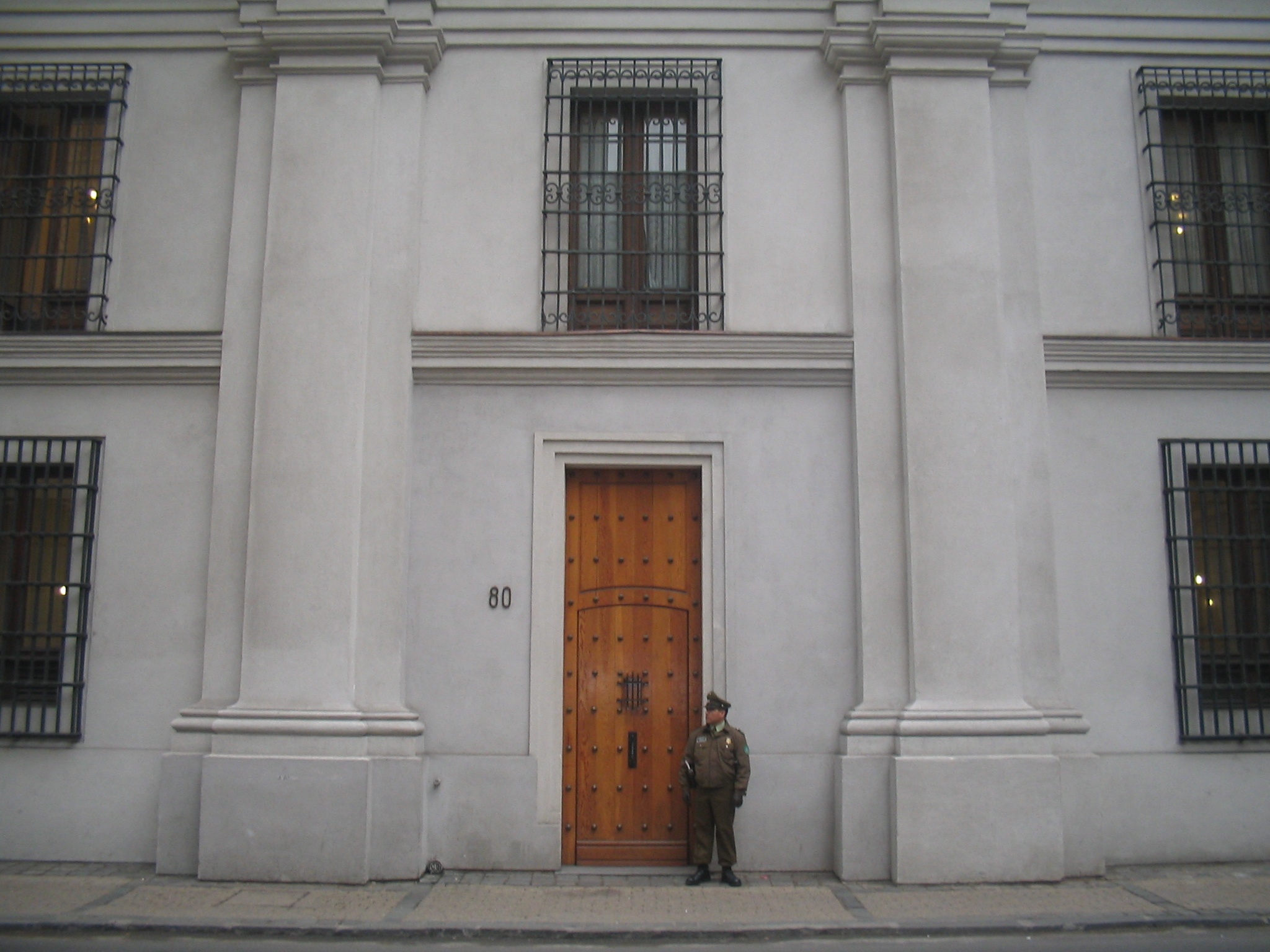
- View of the door being guarded by a carabinero.
- Interactive map of the Morandé 80 area

General information
- Location: Palacio de La Moneda, Santiago, Chile
- Coordinates: 33°26′34″S 70°39′12″W
- Completed: 1906

Morandé 80 is the street address for a door located on the east side of Palacio de La Moneda, the Chilean presidential palace. The door was built in 1906 so that the President of Chile could enter the palace as a common citizen without receiving formal honours from palace guards.

== History ==
Until 1958, the President actually lived in La Moneda, and frequently used the door to access the presidential residence. During the 1973 coup, President Salvador Allende's body was removed from the palace through Morandé 80, and the door was later sealed during renovations on La Moneda. After the return of democracy to Chile, Morandé 80 was used as a symbol by Allende's former supporters.

On September 11, 2003, thirty years after the military coup, President Ricardo Lagos had the door rebuilt. It is opened only on special occasions.
