= Château de la Bonnetière =

Castle in Vienne, France

Coordinates: 46°53′32″N 0°05′39″E

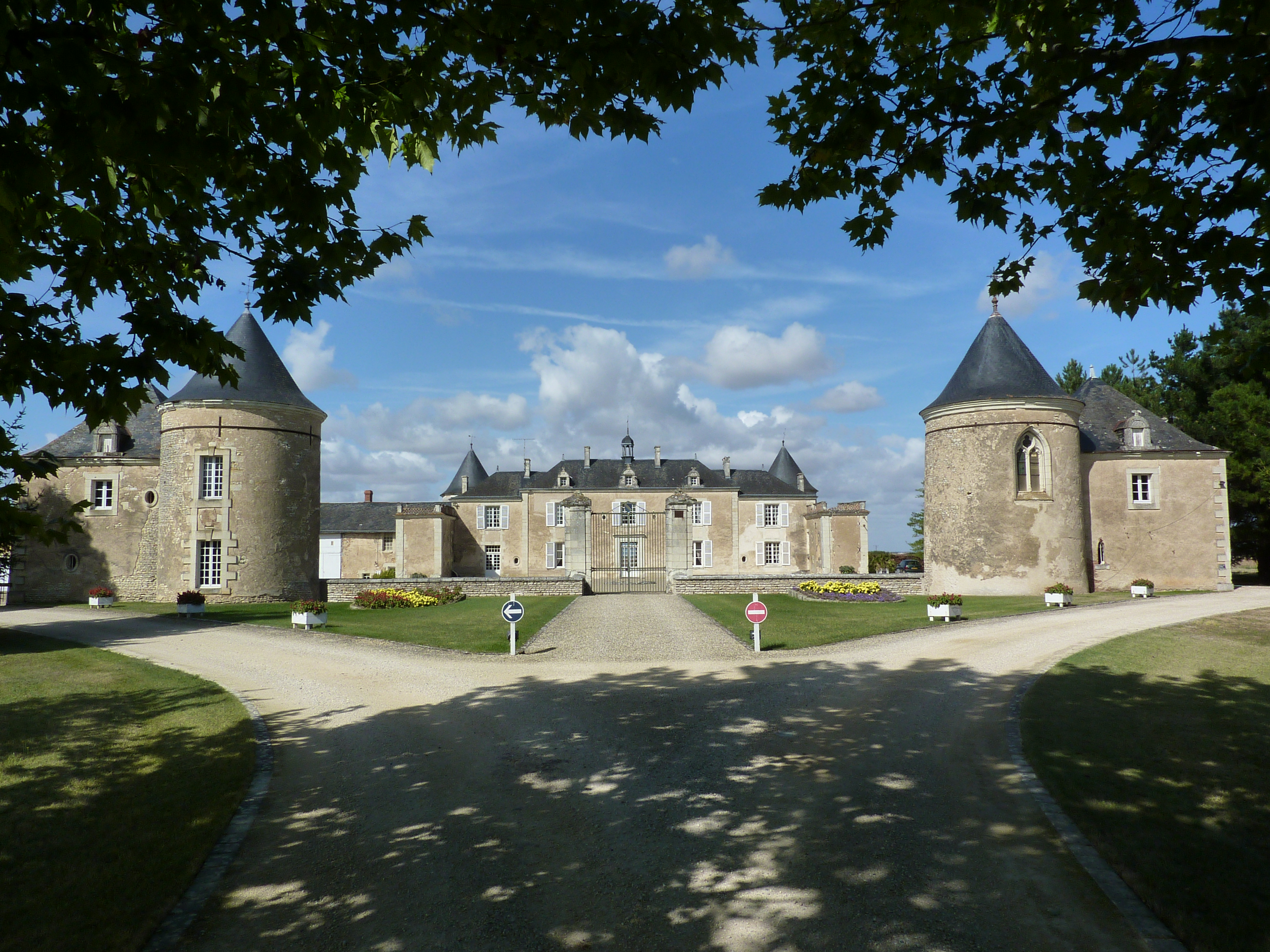

The Château de la Bonnetière is a former castle and now a château situated in the commune of La Chaussée in the Vienne department of France. Its dovecote dates from the 14th century and could accommodate around 1,300 pigeons.

== History ==
Its origin goes back to the 13th century. Formerly a fortress, the château formed part of the defence system of the sénéchaussée of Loudunais.

Originally, four towers were equipped with murder holes and connected by buildings forming a closed interior courtyard. The castle was attacked and partially burned by the English in June 1350 and three of the buildings disappeared.

In the 17th century, the Vaucelles family undertook a restoration. In the 18th century, the Marreau de Boisguérins built the two pavilions attached to the entry towers.

The octagonal dovecote situated in the courtyard dates from the 14th century and is one of the oldest in the sénéchaussée of Loudunais. It was listed as a monument historique on 29 September 1987.

The chapel houses an exhibition on the history of the château.

== See also ==
- List of castles in France
- List of châteaux in France
