= La Moneda Palace =

Coordinates: 33.443018°S 70.653870°W

La Moneda Palace Palacio de La Moneda
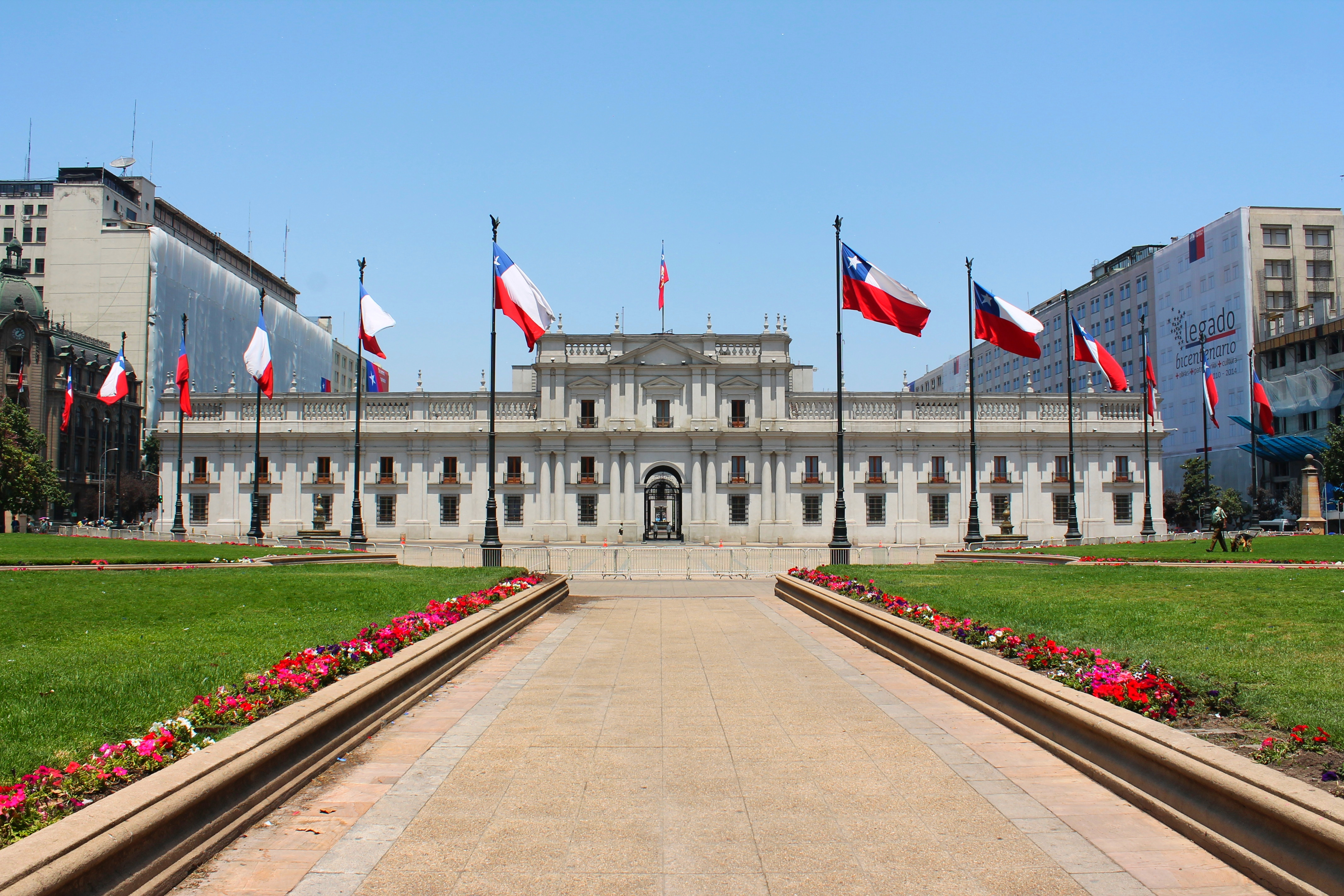
- View of La Moneda from the Plaza de la Constitución

General information
- Architectural style: Neoclassical
- Location: Santiago, Chile
- Construction started: 1784
- Completed: 1805
- Client: Government of Chile

Design and construction
- Architect: Joaquín Toesca

La Moneda Palace (Spanish: Palacio de La Moneda, pronounced [paˈlasjo ðe la moˈneða], lit: Palace of the Mint), or simply La Moneda, is the seat of the president of the Republic of Chile. It also houses the offices of three cabinet ministers: Interior, General Secretariat of the Presidency, and General Secretariat of the Government. Located in downtown Santiago, it occupies an entire block in the Civic District, bordered by Moneda street to the north, Morandé street to the east, Alameda del Libertador Bernardo O'Higgins to the south, and Teatinos street to the west.

== History ==
La Moneda was the colonial mint house of the city during colonial times, and was designed by the Italian architect Joaquín Toesca. Construction began in 1784 and it was opened in 1805. The production of coins in Chile took place at La Moneda from 1814 to 1929.

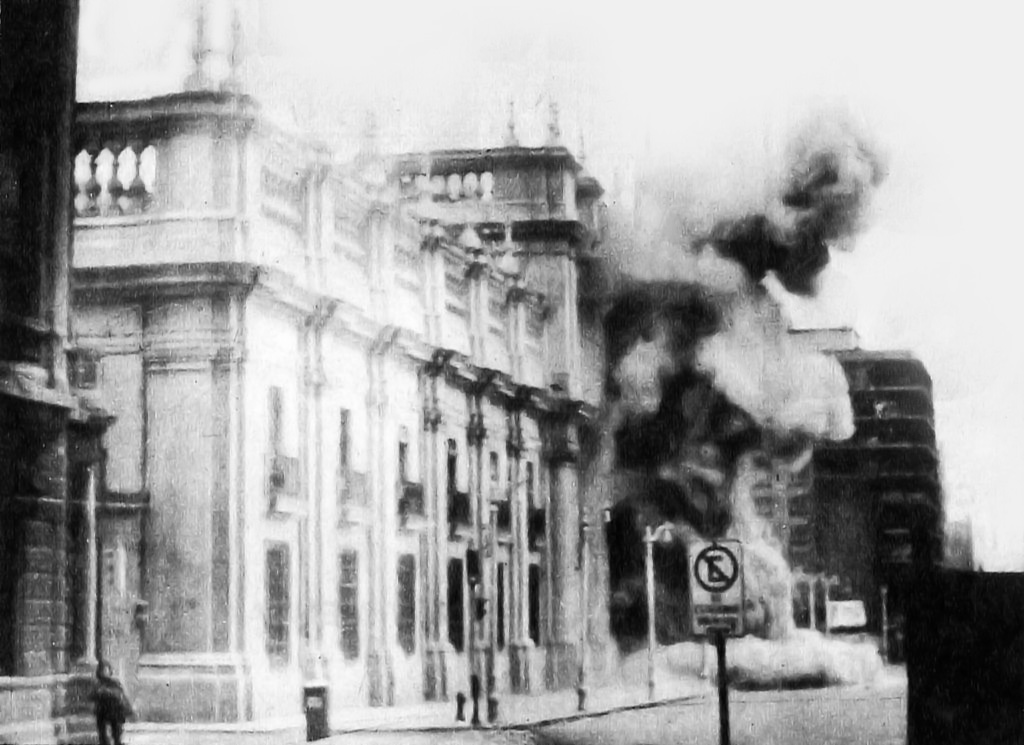
La Moneda pictured on September 11, 1973 after being bombed

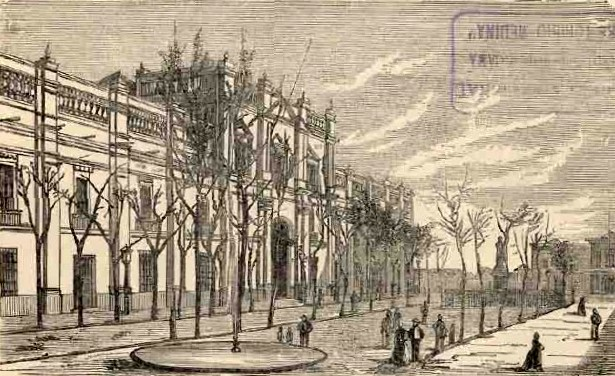
La Moneda Palace in 1872, as pictured by Recaredo Santos Tornero in Chile Ilustrado

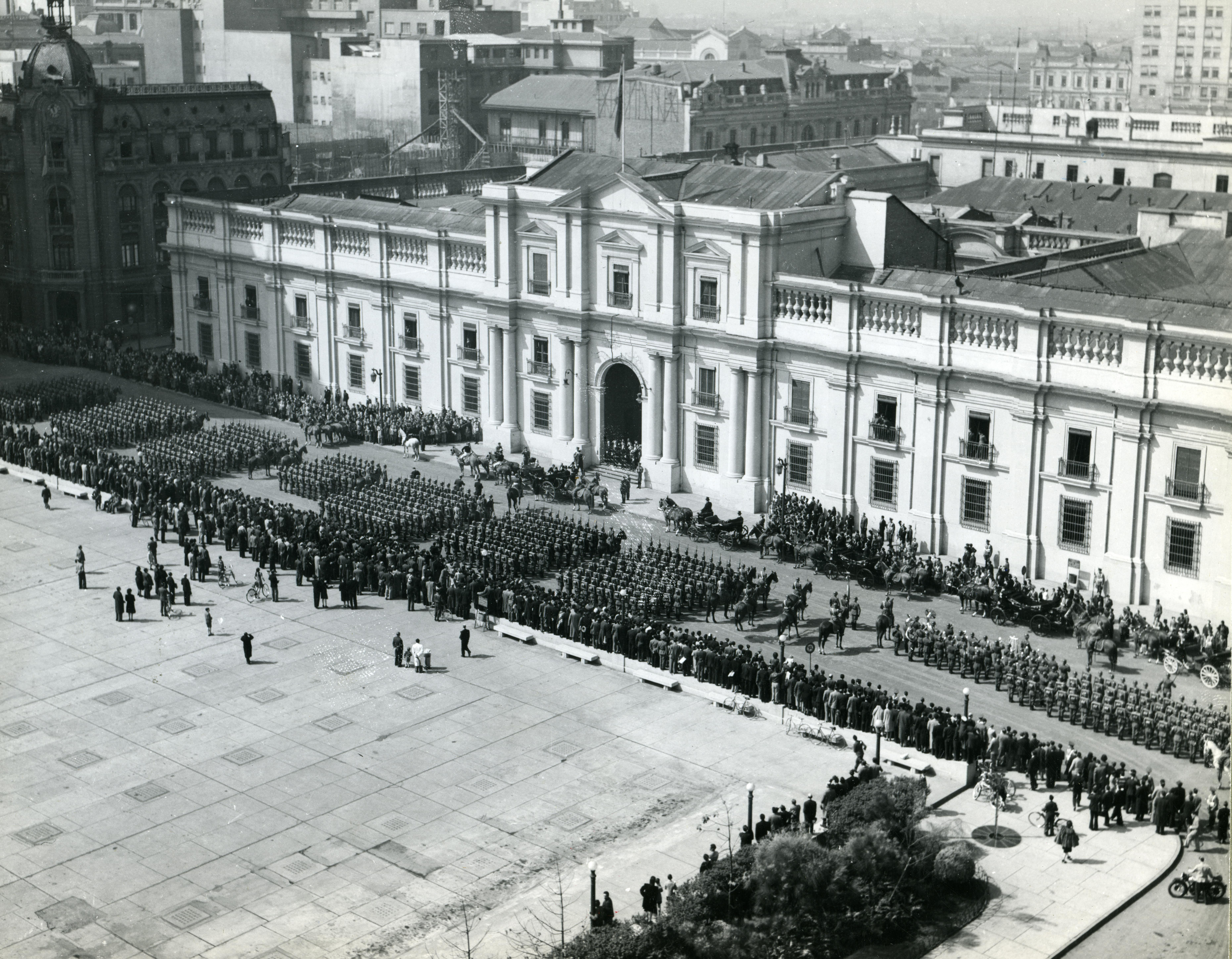
Military parade in front of the Palacio de La Moneda in 1944

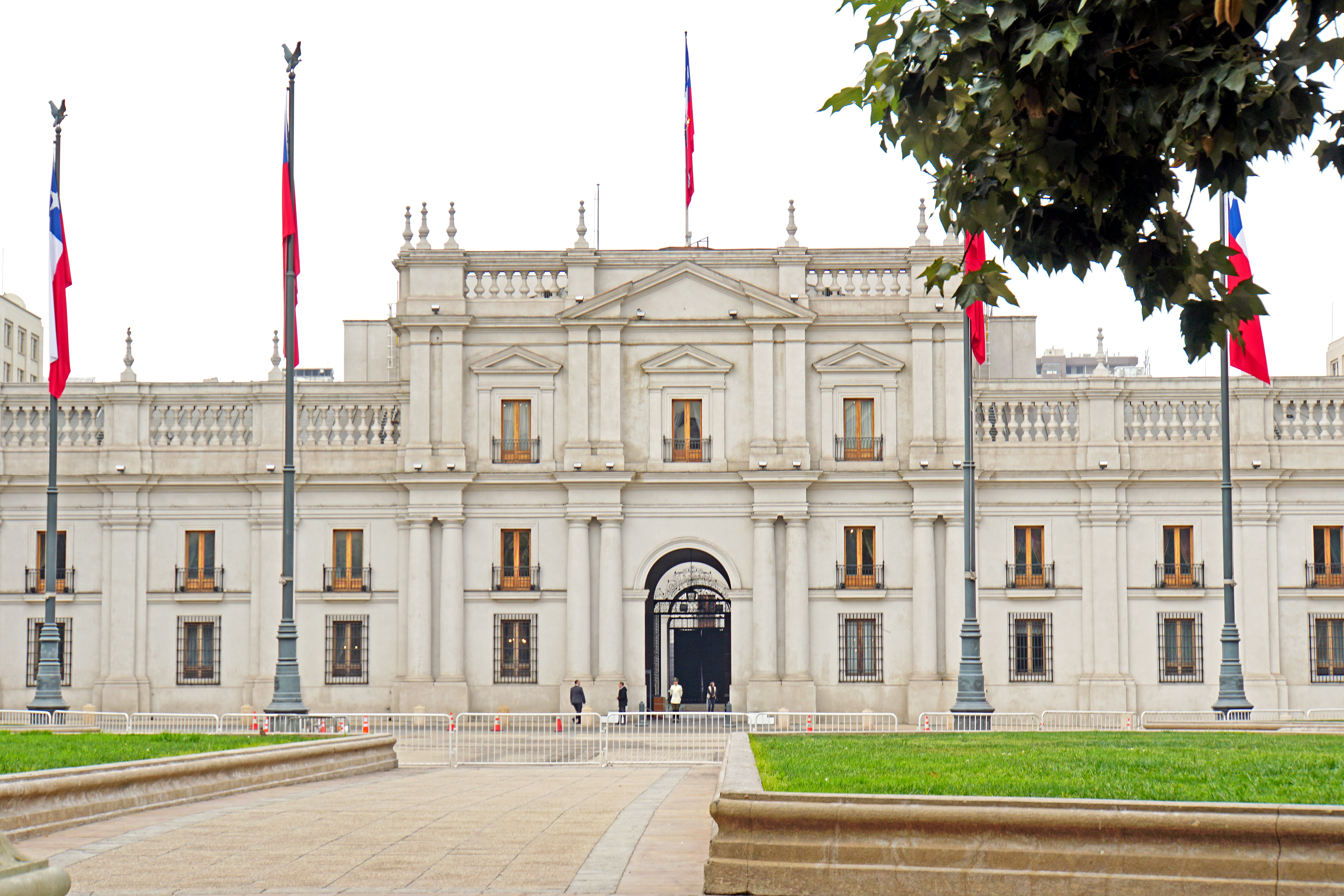
Main facade of the Palacio de La Moneda

In June 1845 during president Manuel Bulnes's administration, the palace became the seat of government and presidential residence. In 1930, a public square—named Plaza de la Constitución ("Constitution Square")—was built in front of the palace. After the presidency of Gabriel González Videla it ceased to serve as a presidential residence.

During the military coup d'état on September 11, 1973, the Chilean Air Force strafed the palace with unguided rockets and automatic cannon fire. The president Salvador Allende died by suicide in the palace on the same day. Restoration projects of the damage caused were completed in March 1981, although some bullet marks have been preserved and can still be seen today. During the 1973–1980 restorations, an underground office complex (the so-called "bunker") was built under the front square to provide a safe escape for the dictator Augusto Pinochet in case of an attack.

Under the presidency of Eduardo Frei Ruiz-Tagle, the palace was painted white. During President Ricardo Lagos's administration, the palace's inner courtyards were opened to the public during certain hours of the day. Lagos also re-opened Morandé 80—a gate used by Chilean presidents to enter the palace since the early 20th century. It was eliminated during the restoration of the palace as not being in the original plans, but was restored because of the heavy symbolism attached to it as being the gate through which Chilean presidents entered La Moneda skipping the main's gate guard protocol or, in other words, as ordinary citizens of the country. It was also the gate through which the body of President Allende was taken out after the 1973 coup.

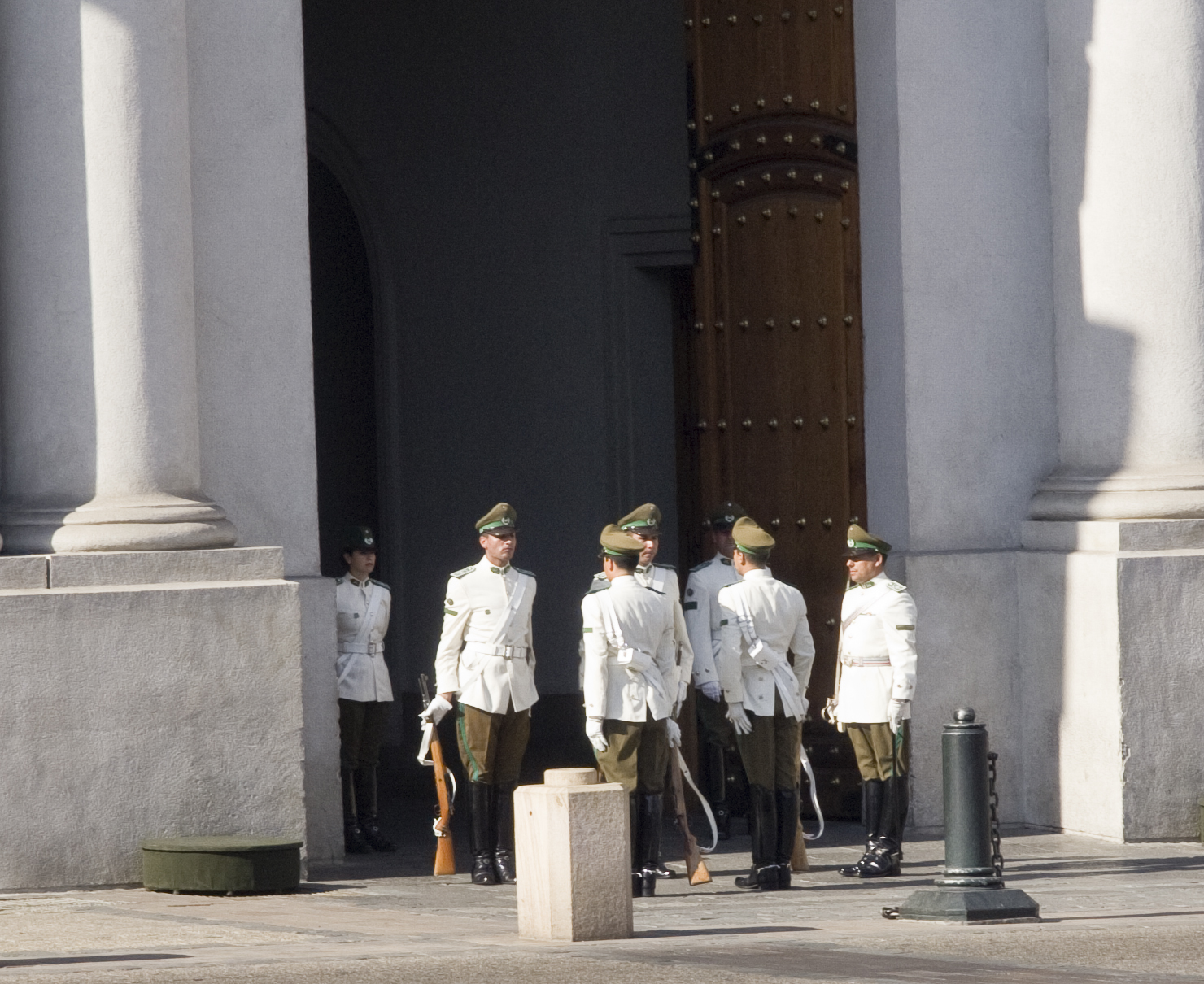
Changing of the Guard

A traditional changing of the guard ceremony takes place every two days on odd-numbered days in odd-numbered months, even-numbered days in even-numbered months, including Sundays, at 10 a.m. weekdays and 11 a.m. on weekends (as of June 2015). A formal ceremony dating back to the 1850s, it lasts about 30 minutes and includes a band playing, troops with horses parading into the square, and much pomp and circumstance. The Carabineros de Chile provides the guard unit and band for the ceremony, the guard unit being composed of a Foot Guards battalion and a Horse Guards squadron.

== Architecture ==
=== Construction ===
Joaquín Toesca had worked on many public buildings in colonial Chile, including the Santiago Metropolitan Cathedral, before he was engaged to design the new royal mint that would become the Palacio de la Moneda.

Works on the building started in 1784, with building materials arriving the following year from around Chile and the world: limestone from the Polpaico country estate; sand from the Maipo River; red stones from a quarry at the Cerro San Cristóbal in Santiago; white stone from the neighbouring Cerro Blanco; oak and cypress wood from Valdivia; Spanish metal works from Vizcaya. Twenty varieties of brick were baked in Santiago for the construction of lintels, comers, floors, moldings, and of the solid walls more than a meter thick.

Toesca died in 1799, before seeing his work finished, and military engineer Agustin Cavallero took over the project. The "Mint House of Santiago de Chile" finally opened in 1805.

In 1929, an annex was commissioned the then President Carlos Ibáñez del Campo to give the palace a facade to face the Alameda Avenue, the main street of Santiago. The project was designed by Josué Smith strictly following the design of the original construction. The three-floor annex was built using part of the original construction that was occupied until that date by the mint, which was relocated to a site adjacent to Quinta Normal Park.

In 1940, a former mint pavilion, part of the original design of Toesca, was demolished to make way for the Patio de los Naranjos.

=== Architectural style ===
The Palacio de la Moneda is built in a pure neoclassical style with Roman Doric influences. The building's wide, horizontal shape and rectangular composition conveys strength and stability, according to the palace's listing on the UNESCO website. Its main façade faces Moneda street, and its rooms are distributed along the transverse and longitudinal axes forming several patios.

Behind this façade lie three patios: the Patio de los Cañones, which functions as an entrance hall; a covered patio; and finally the Patio de los Naranjos, where presidential ceremonies take place.

The architecture website ARQHYS.com states that the Palacio de la Moneda is "the only structure in the pure Italian neoclassical style that exists in Latin America."

The building has been subject to several modifications throughout the years, made by different presidents. The last great restoration of the building was carried out after the 1973 military coup, when large portions of the building were destroyed or damaged.

=== Plaza de la Ciudadanía ===
To celebrate the bicentenary of Chile's independence in 2010, a new public square called the Plaza de la Ciudadanía ("Citizenry Square" in Spanish) was constructed on the south side of the palace stretching down to the Avenida Libertador General Bernardo O'Higgins or "Alameda". Construction began in May 2004 and the plaza was inaugurated in December 2005.

Designed by Undurraga Devés Arquitectos, the Plaza de la Ciudadanía has been called "one of the most important public works in the last century" by Chile's Plataforma Arquitectura website. Paths leading down from the plaza give access to the underground Palacio de La Moneda Cultural Center, which hosts a range of exhibitions on Chilean culture and history.

A national flag raising ceremony has been held there since 2010, held on a monthly basis.

== Gallery ==
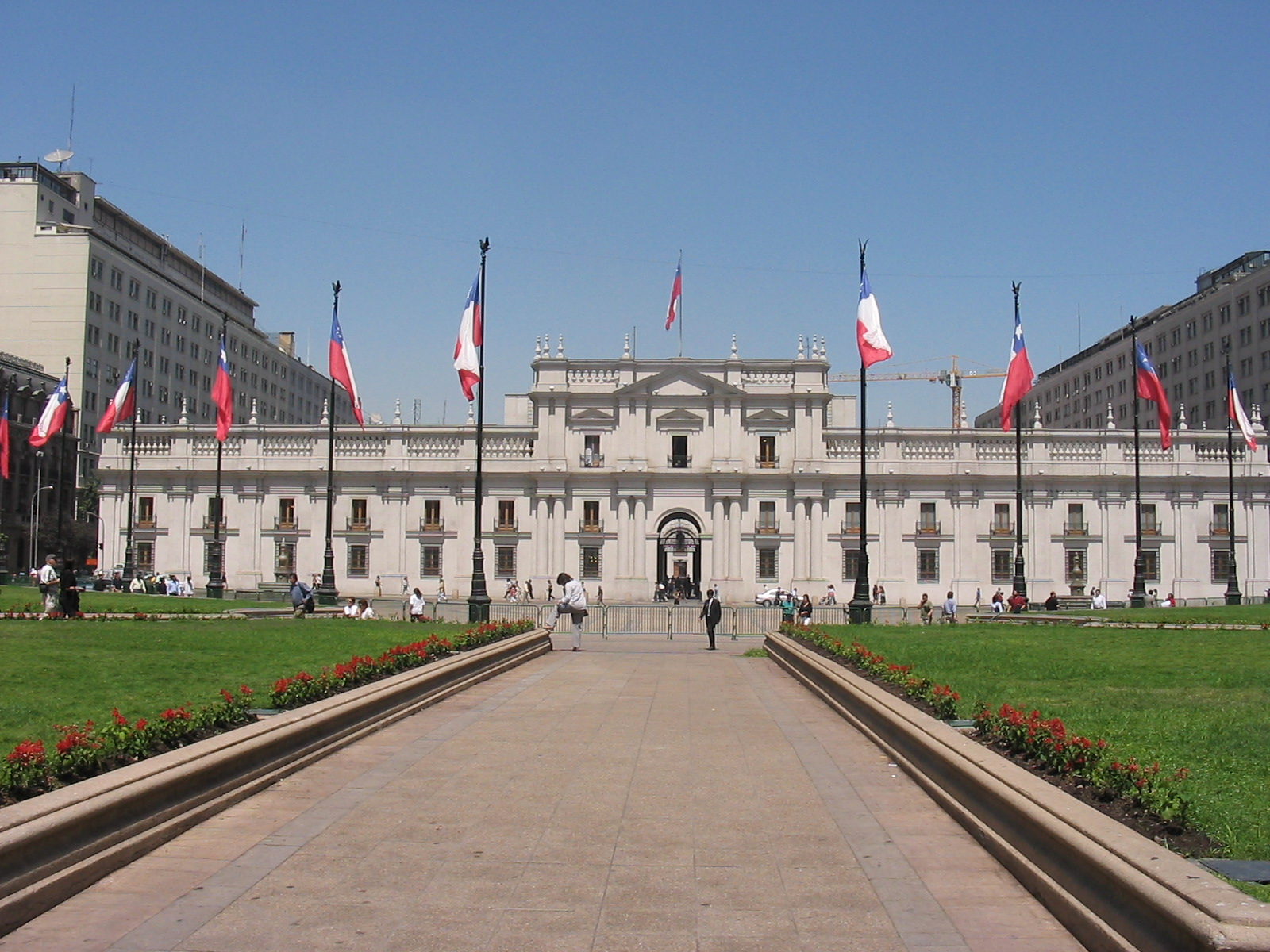
Front view of La Moneda

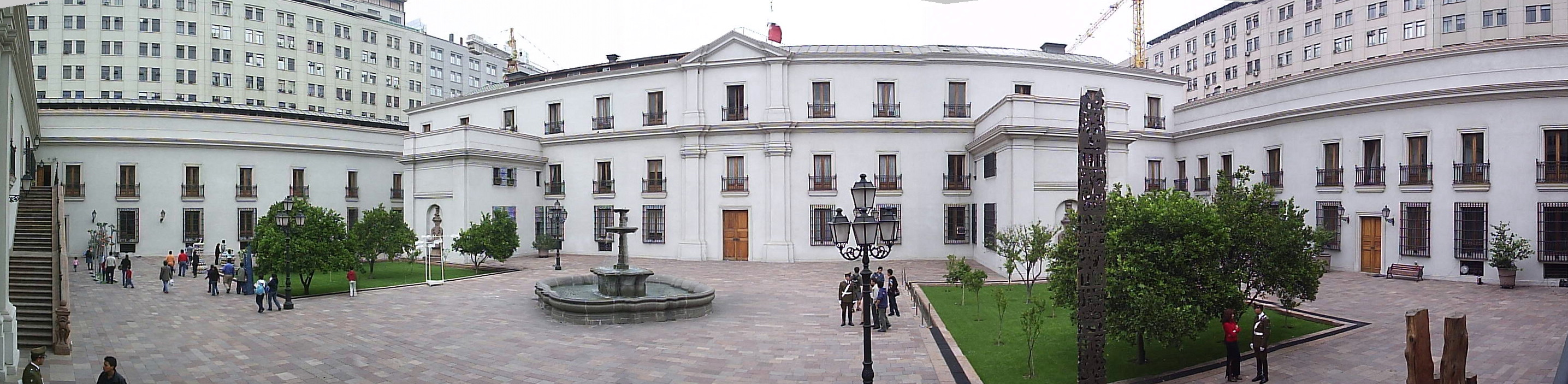
Orange trees yard inside La Moneda

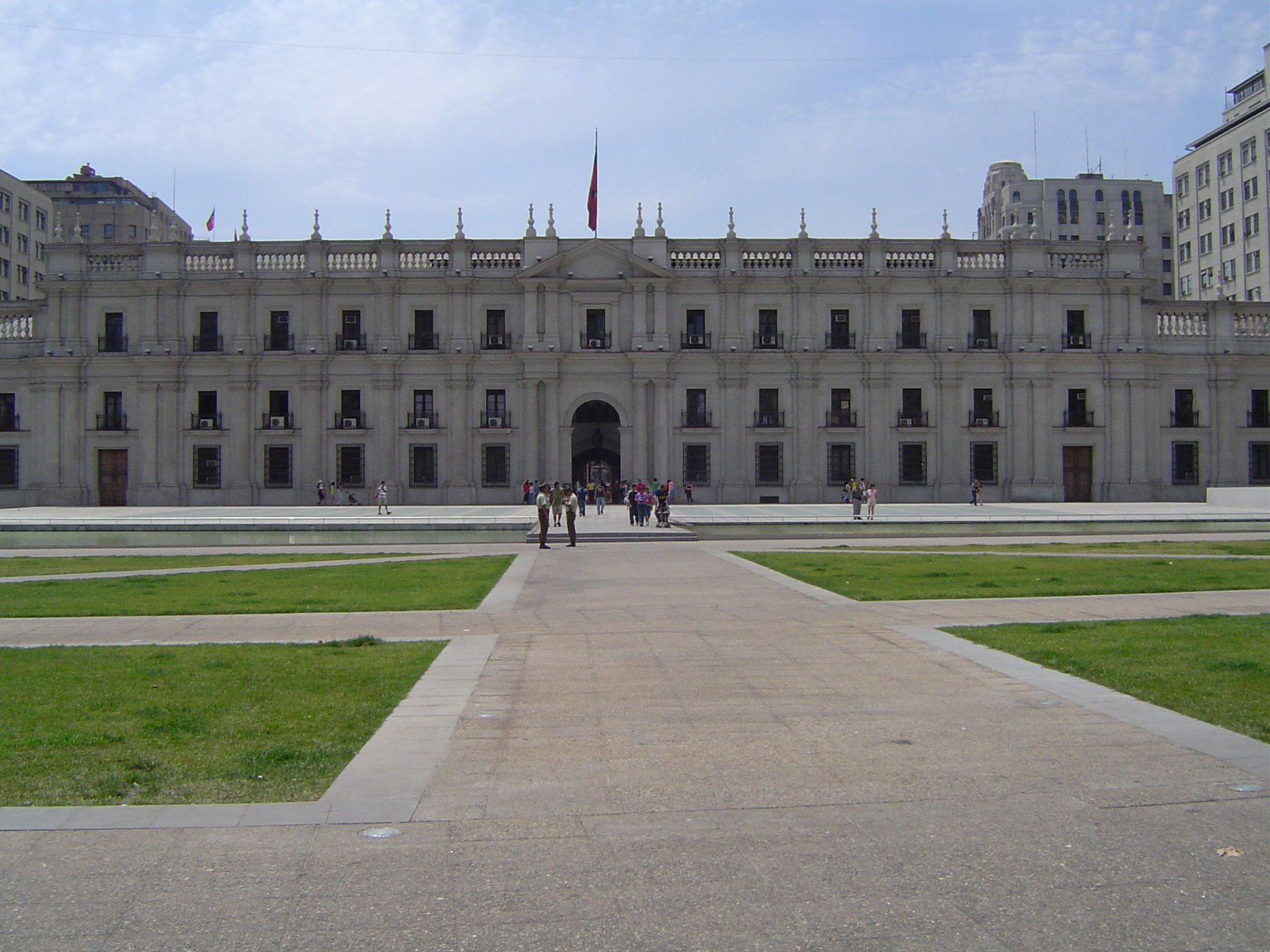
Citizenry Square

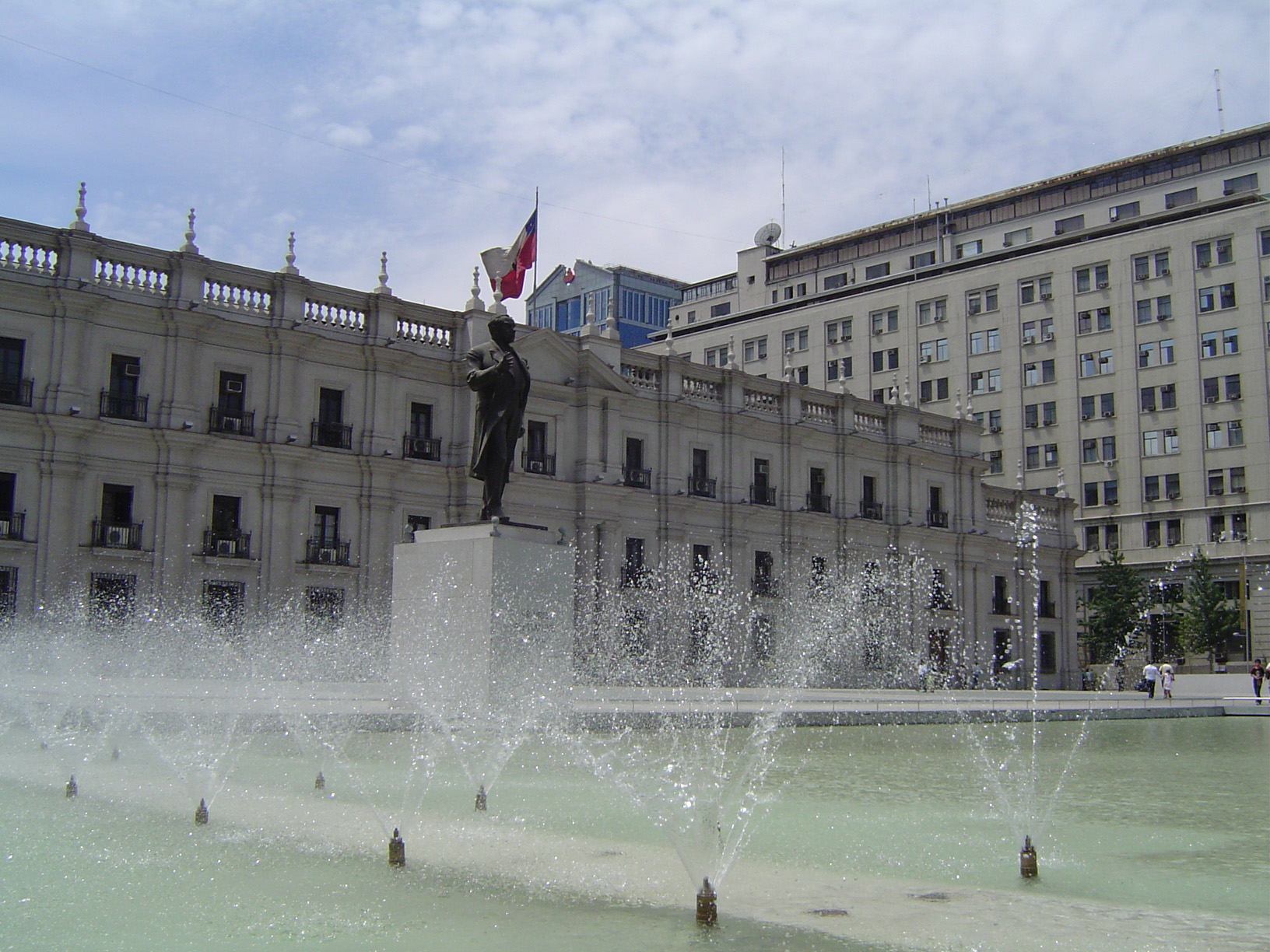
Statue of the President Arturo Alessandri at Citizenry Square

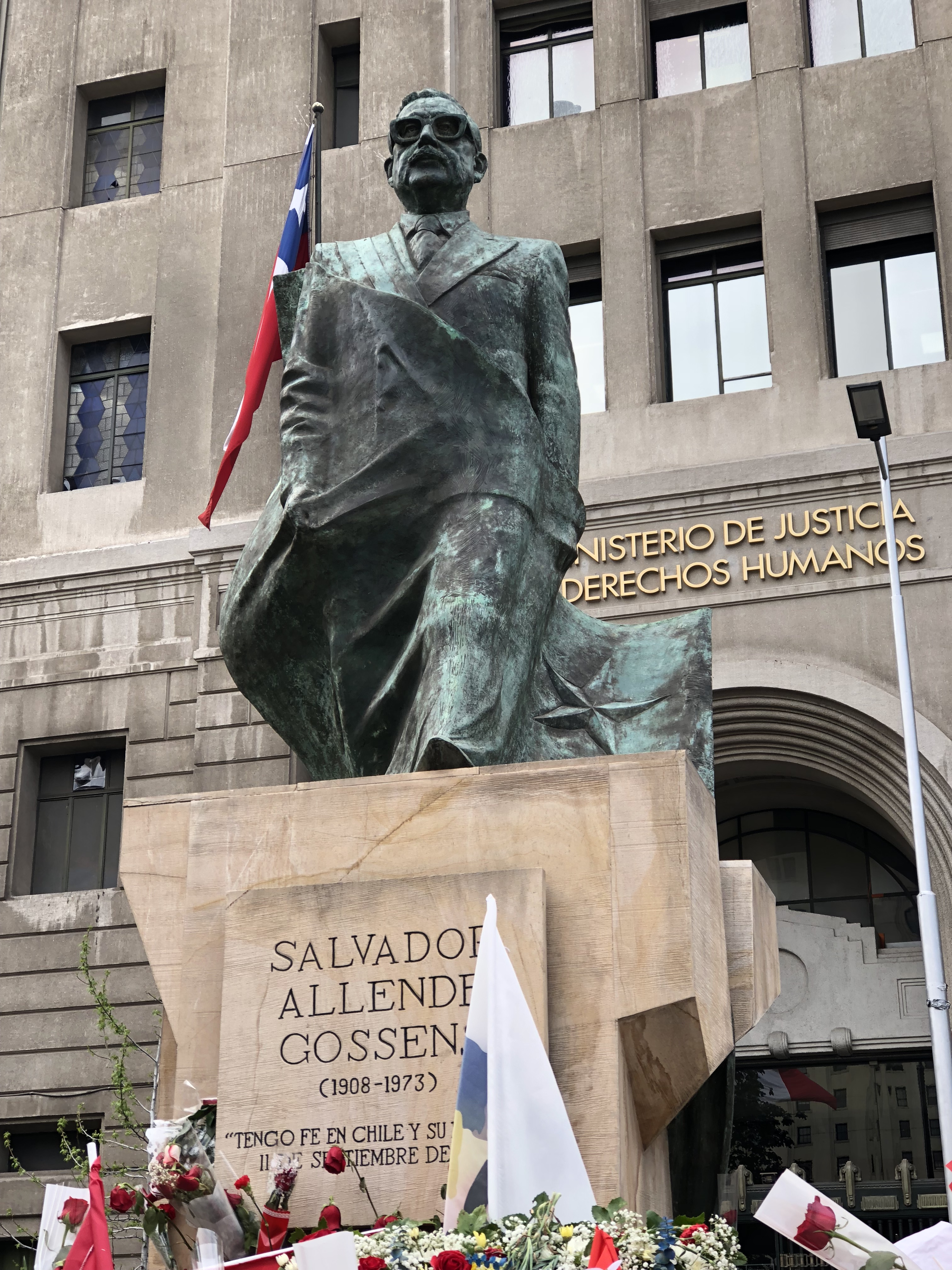
Statue of president Salvador Allende at Constitution Square

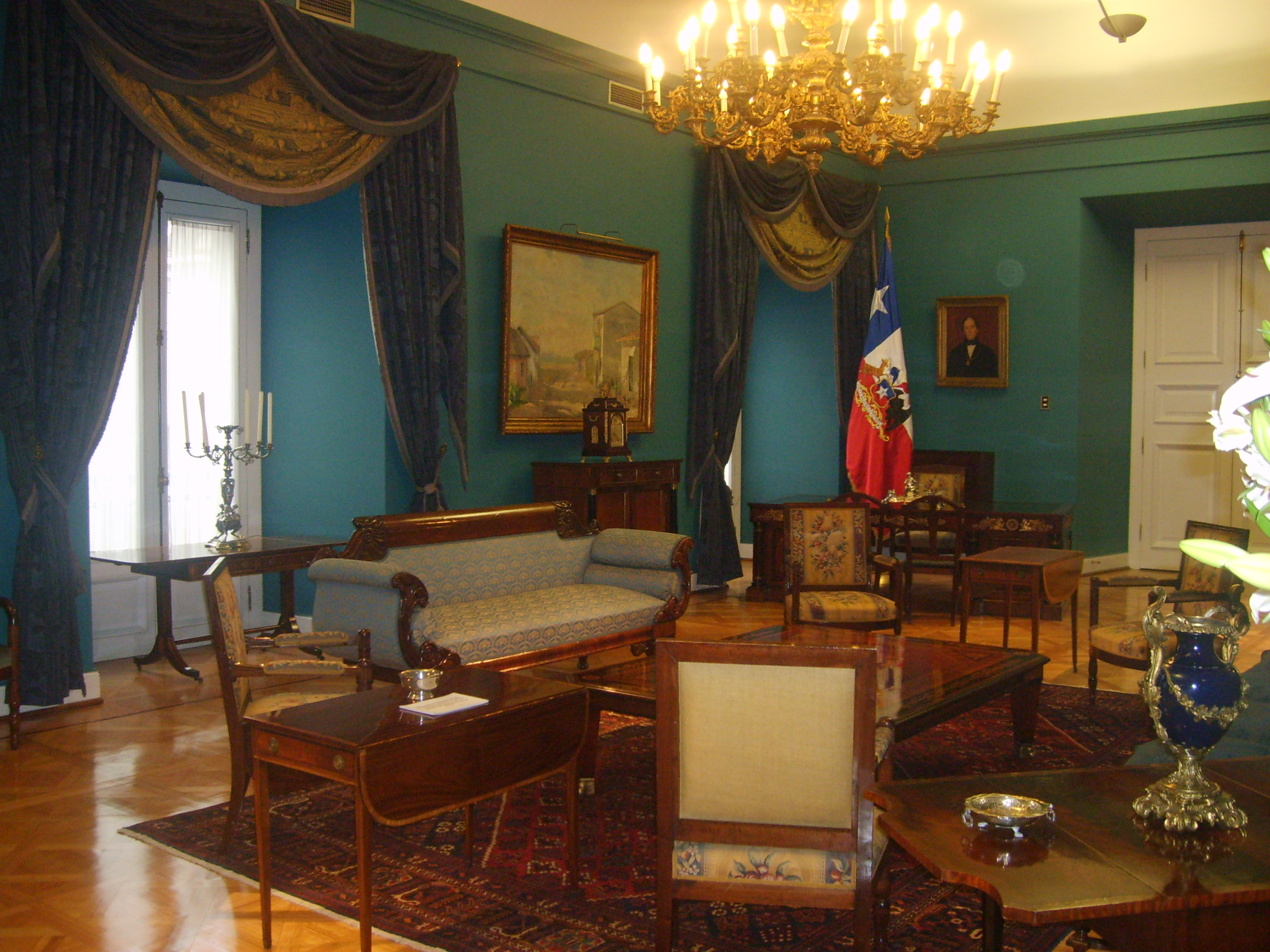
The "blue room" where the president receives his or her visitors

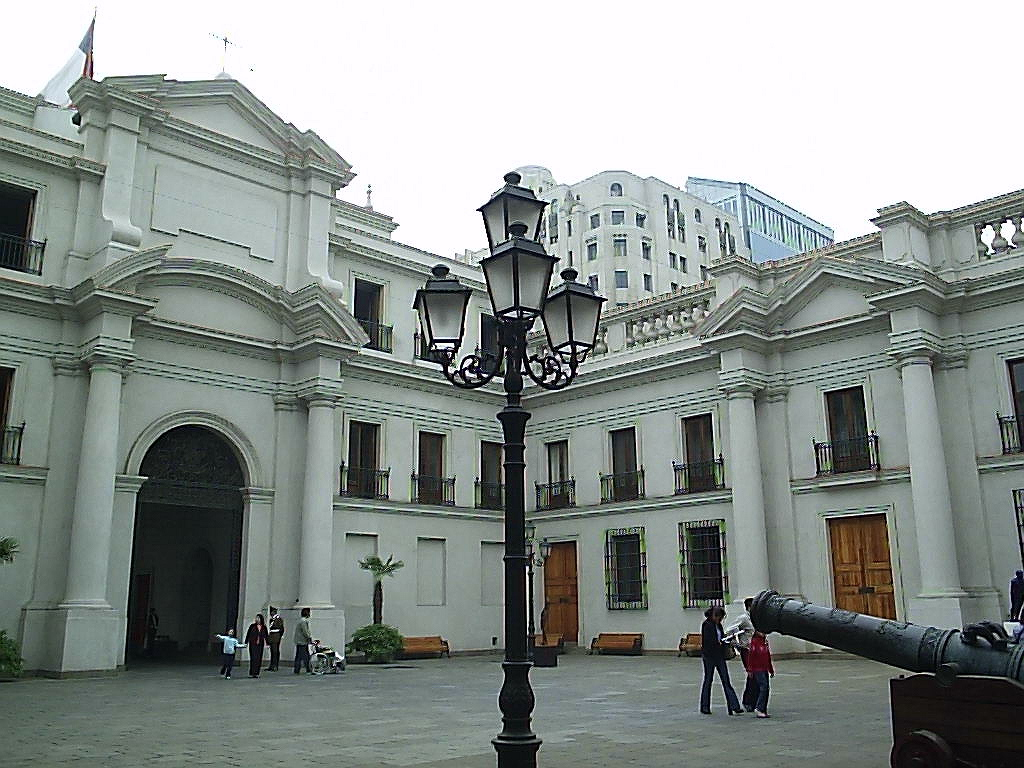
Cannon yard inside La Moneda

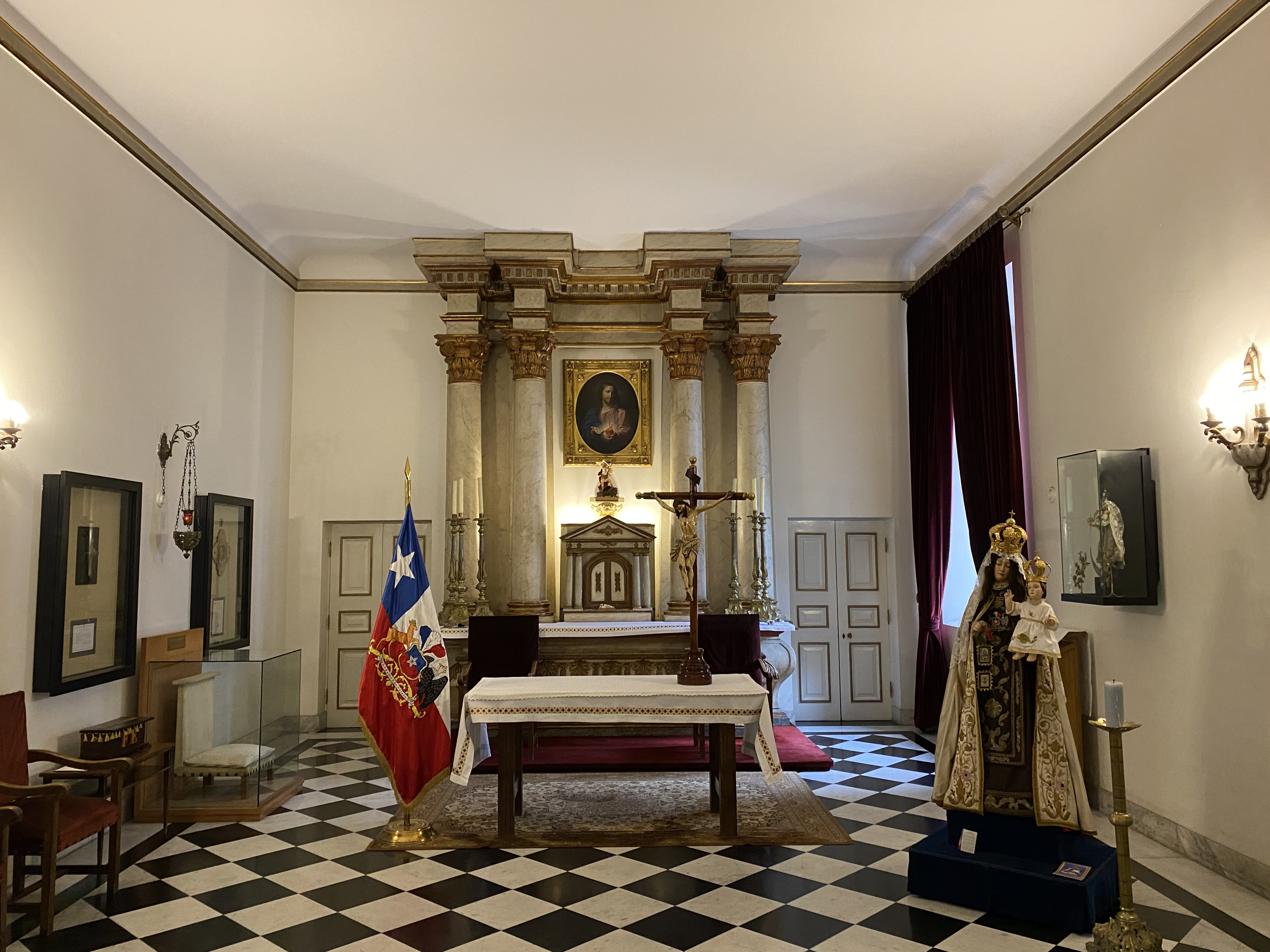
The chapel

== See also ==
- La Moneda Palace Guard
- Palace of Cerro Castillo
