= Museo de la Solidaridad Salvador Allende =

Contemporary art museum in Santiago, Chile

Museum of Solidarity Salvador Allende
- Museo de la Solidaridad Salvador Allende

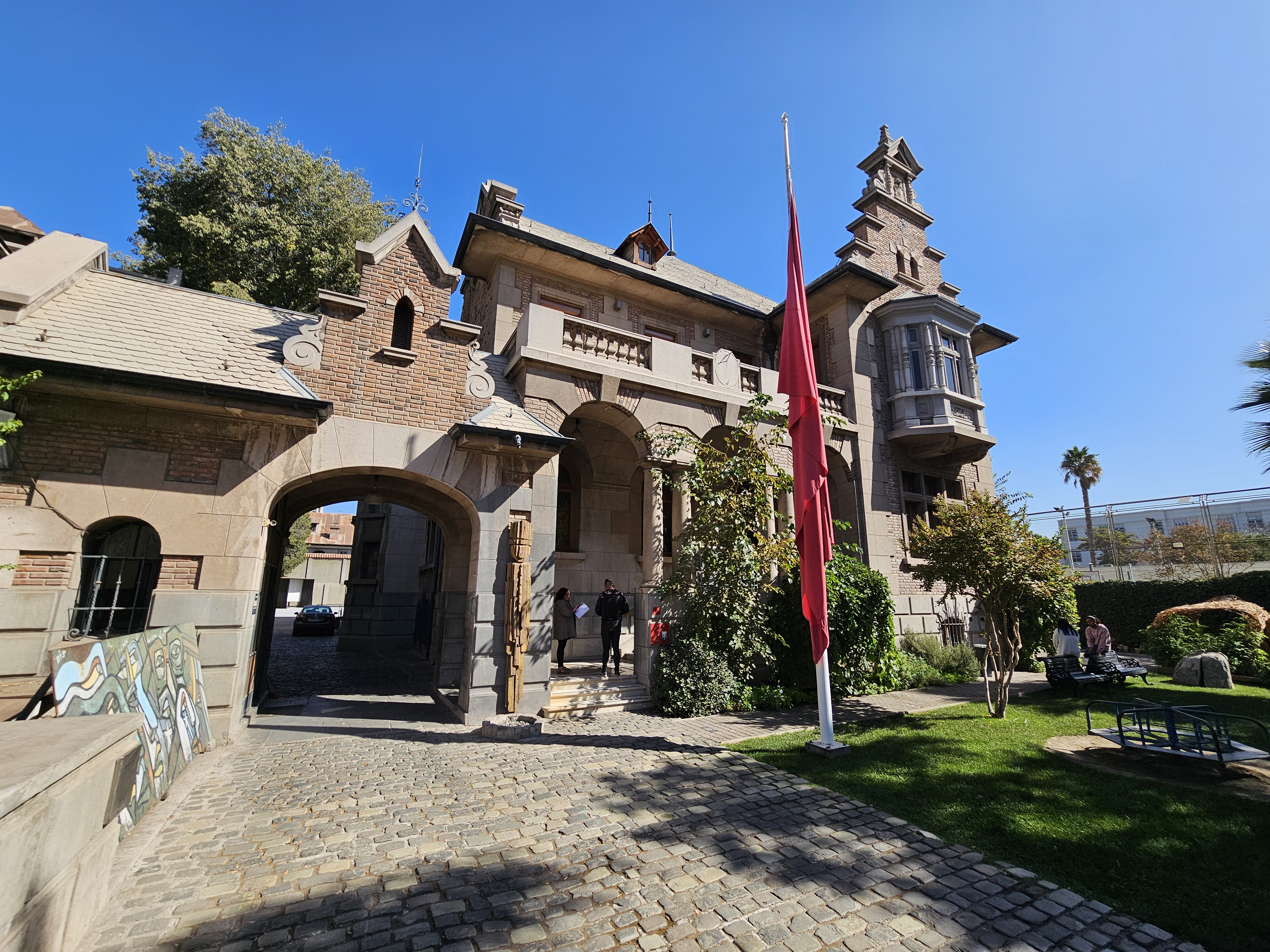
- Entrance
- Established: 1972
- Location: Santiago, Chile
- Coordinates: 33°27′15″S 70°40′03″W
- Website: mssa.cl

The Museum of Solidarity Salvador Allende (Spanish: Museo de la Solidaridad Salvador Allende) is a contemporary art museum located in Santiago, Chile, named after Salvador Allende, president of Chile between 1970 and 1973.

== History ==
=== Museum of Solidarity (1971-1973) ===
In 1971, Spanish art critic José María Moreno Galván proposed the creation of an art museum in support of the government of the Unidad Popular. After the project was approved by Salvador Allende himself, the Comité Internacional de Solidaridad Artística con Chile (CISAC) (International Committee of Artistic Solidarity with Chile) was formed, bringing together national and international intellectuals such as the Brazilian intellectual Mário Pedrosa and the Italian Carlo Levi.

Allende call to artists worldwide through an open letter, and as a result of CISAC's efforts, artworks began to arrive promptly from different parts of the world between 1972 and 1973, totaling 650 artistic pieces, including paintings, prints, sculptures, drawings, tapestries, and photographs. Artists like Joan Miró, Roberto Matta, Lygia Clark, and Frank Stella sent their contributions during this period.

The Museum of Solidarity was officially inaugurated on May 17, 1972, by President Allende with an exhibition at the Museum of Contemporary Art of the University of Chile. However, it did not manage to have its own physical space nor did it have a legal entity, being managed by the Institute of Latin American Art of the University of Chile.

After the coup d'état on September 11, 1973, the museum was closed, its managers suffered exile, and part of the collection was lost. Some pieces were stored in the Santiago Museum of Contemporary Art, while others ended up at the National Museum of Fine Arts.

=== International Museum of Resistance Salvador Allende (1975-1990) ===
The project started up again in Havana and Paris, with the name Museo Internacional de la Resistencia Salvador Allende (MIRSA, International Museum of Resistance Salvador Allende), under the leadership of Miria Contreras, President Allende's former assistant, in collaboration with the museum founders. Exiled artists including José Balmes, Pedro Miras, and Carmen Waugh, continued to call for donations of artworks to support resistance in Chile, organizing exhibitions that denounced human rights violations throughout Europe."

=== Museum of Solidarity Salvador Allende (1990-) ===
With the return to democracy in Chile, the Salvador Allende Foundation began the recovery of works from the collection in 1990. In September 1991, the Museum of Solidarity was reopened at the National Museum of Fine Arts at the same time that the Solidarity Collection was transferred from the museum to the national state.

In 1992, the Chilean state loaned the collection works to the Salvador Allende Foundation. Since 2005, the Arte y Solidaridad Foundation has been responsible for managing, disseminating, researching, and activating its collection and historical archive, and the Museum of Solidarity was moved to the Heiremans Palace in the Republic neighborhood of Santiago.

On December 10, 2023, the museum received 18 works from the Museum of Contemporary Art of Villafamés (MACVAC) in Spain, which had been stored in that country for over 30 years.

== Building ==
The museum is housed in the Palacio Heiremans, which was constructed in 1925 for Belgian entrepreneur Amadeo Heiremans Vaerman. During the Military dictatorship of Augusto Pinochet, the building works as a detention center and a listening station of the DINA. It is located in the República neighborhood.
