= Alejandrina Cox incident =

1973 Chilean political incident

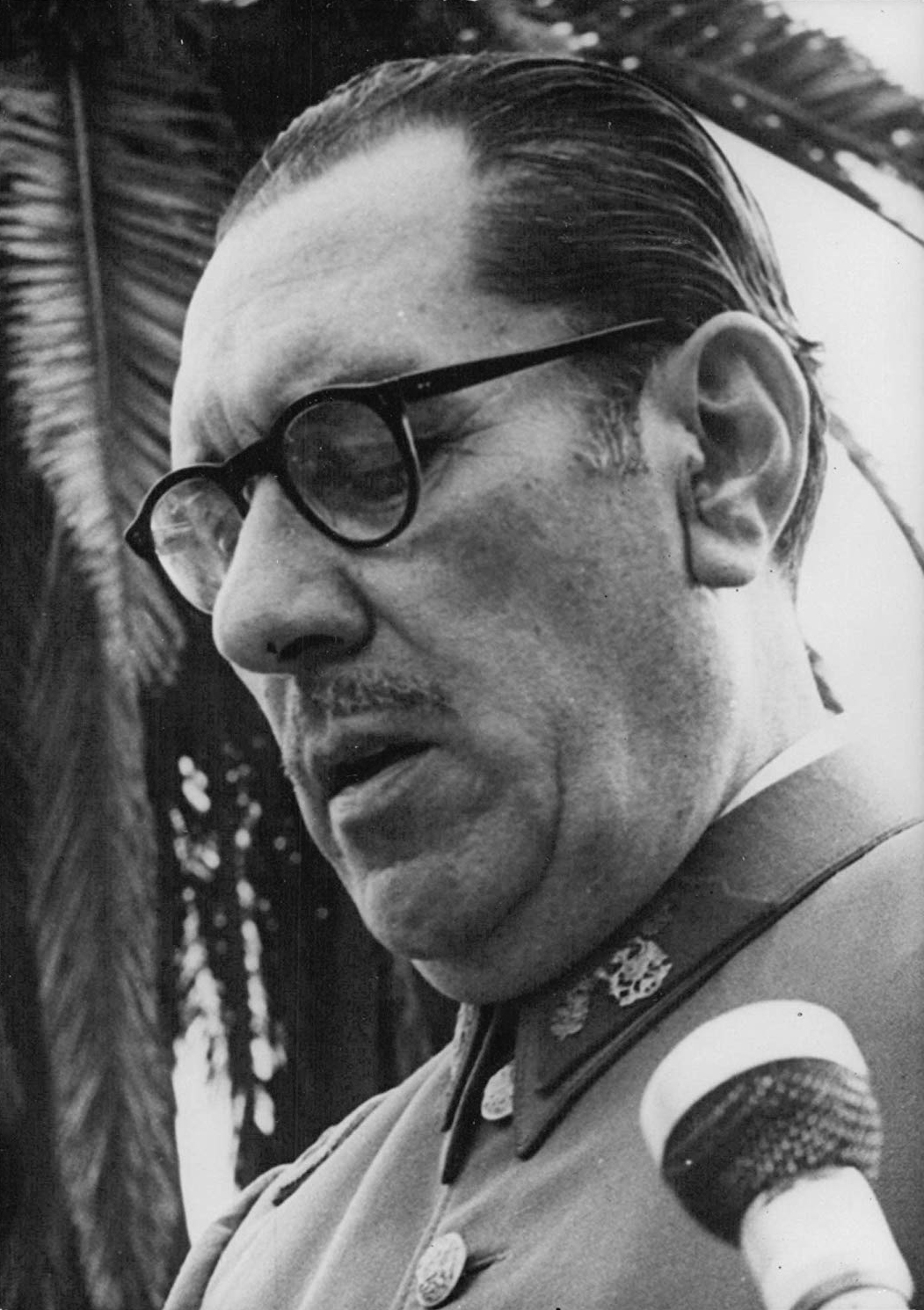
General Carlos Prats

The Alejandrina Cox incident (Spanish: Incidente Alejandrina Cox) was a significant political scandal that occurred in Chile on 27 June 1973, involving General Carlos Prats, who served as the Minister of the Interior and commander-in-chief of the Chilean Army. During a traffic dispute in Santiago, Prats fired his weapon at a civilian woman named Alejandrina Cox, which caused a media frenzy in Chile. Prats was a prominent supporter of the Schneider Doctrine, a military doctrine that opposed military intervention in the government of President Salvador Allende. However, the incident led to his public embarrassment and the loss of support from the Chilean military. Consequently, he resigned from his position and was replaced by Augusto Pinochet in August, which paved the way for the eventual 1973 Chilean coup d'état in September.

== Background ==
In 1973, Chile experienced a surge of civil unrest that reflected both support and opposition for the policies of President Salvador Allende and his Popular Unity government. General Carlos Prats, who served as both Minister of the Interior and commander-in-chief of the Chilean Army, was tasked with maintaining order in a highly polarized nation. The Chilean military held mixed views on Allende, a staunch Marxist, with some factions advocating for his removal and others arguing for his tolerance. Prats, a prominent proponent of the Schneider Doctrine, represented the Chilean military's constitutionalist stance against military intervention in Allende's leftist government.

== Incident ==
Alejandrina Cox

On 27 June 1973, General Carlos Prats was being driven to his office in his official car through a busy intersection in Las Condes, an upper-class suburb of Santiago. At that time, due to the animosity directed towards him, he was frequently insulted by people in nearby cars. As he drove through the intersection, a small red Renault car pulled up next to him, and two occupants inside began mocking and making obscene gestures towards him.

General Prats asked his driver to hand him his handgun and, pointing it at the red car, ordered the driver to stop. However, the other driver ignored him, and the general shot at the red car's left front fender. Both cars immediately stopped, and the drivers came out. It was then that the general discovered that the other driver was Alejandrina Cox, an upper-class housewife whose short hair had led him to mistake her for a man.

As General Prats remonstrated with Mrs. Cox, a crowd began to gather, and many sided with the woman. The general's official car was blocked from moving, and he was soon being insulted. A passing taxi driver rescued him from the street after his car was vandalized and his tires were slashed.

General Prats immediately went to the Palacio de La Moneda, where he tendered his resignation to President Allende. However, the president refused to accept it and convinced him to stay in the government. Reports of the incident quickly made headlines on the front pages of the newspapers. Allende's opposition seized on the event, accusing the general of cowardice and of losing his self-control by firing at the vehicle of an unarmed woman. However, the government press defended him, stating that General Prats had been provoked and that the incident could have been a failed attempt on his life.

The Chilean Army general staff publicly backed General Prats, but the controversy surrounding the issue, combined with existing social unrest, continued to simmer. The incident occurred within a block of where General René Schneider had been assassinated three years prior.

== Aftermath ==
The incident severely damaged Prats' reputation as a serious and level-headed defender of the Schneider Doctrine, which sought to keep the military out of civilian affairs. As commander-in-chief of the Chilean Army, Prats' standing was weakened in the eyes of the officer corps, and he remained in office for less than two months after the incident. Eventually, Prats and Cox apologized to each other. Although Prats recovered some of his public standing by his bravery during the Tanquetazo two days later, his position was permanently undermined.

On 22 August 1973, public protests led by the wives of his generals and officers in front of his home further eroded Prats' support, ultimately leading to his resignation as commander-in-chief of the Army. His resignation removed the last obstacle for those seeking to overthrow Allende by force. It also coincided with the approval of a resolution by the Chamber of Deputies that alleged the government was not respecting the constitution. The following day, Allende appointed Augusto Pinochet to replace Prats as commander-in-chief of the Army. Three weeks later, on 11 September 1973, the Chilean coup occurred, and the military overthrew Allende.

== See also ==
- Chilean coup of 1973
- Chilean political scandals
