= Schneider Doctrine =

Political doctrine

The Schneider Doctrine was a political doctrine originally espoused by Chilean General René Schneider, which is viewed to have allowed the election of Salvador Allende as President of Chile, and was the main ideological obstacle to a military coup d'état against him. The doctrine was influential through the period July 1970 - September 1973.

== Background ==
General René Schneider was Commander-in-chief of the Chilean Army at the time of the 1970 Chilean presidential election, in which Salvador Allende won a plurality on September 4, 1970, requiring a Congressional vote to declare a winner. At that time the prospect of Salvador Allende winning the Chilean presidency was highly controversial, particularly within the Chilean military, because of his avowed Marxist ideology.

In response to all the public calls that the military received to intervene in the electoral process and prevent Allende's election, General Schneider expressed a profound belief in the apolitical role of the military and a firm opposition to the idea of preventing Allende's inauguration by means of a coup d'état. As a constitutionalist, he wished to preserve the military's apolitical role.

== Doctrine ==
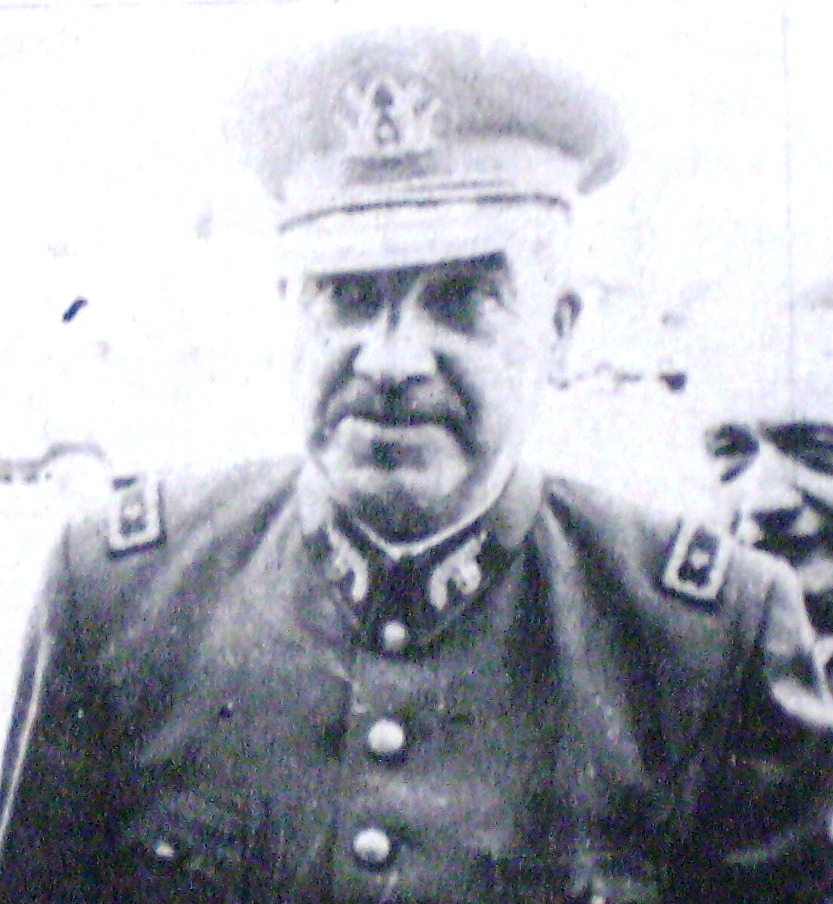
General René Schneider.

He first enunciated this doctrine at a General Staff meeting on July 23, 1970. He wanted to make clear that:

"The armed forces are not a road to political power nor an alternative to that power. They exist to guarantee the regular work of the political system and the use of force for any other purpose than its defense constitute high treason."

He reinforced his posture with a public message to the military on September 19, 1970, during the celebrations of Army day and in the midst of the campaign to obtain congressional ratification to Allende's marginal electoral victory, saying that "there were no options that would invite the armed forces to undo what the politicians had wrought in Chile". Nonetheless, he added a colophon:

"The only limitation is in the case that the State stopped acting within their own legality. In that case the armed forces have a higher loyalty to the people and are free to decide an abnormal situation beyond the framework of the law".

Schneider was assassinated on October 24, 1970 as the target of a Central Intelligence Agency supported coup attempt inspired by his conviction demonstrated by the doctrine. His successor as Army Commander-in-chief, General Carlos Prats, became the spokesman for the "constitutionalists". Prats shared a similar sentiment against the intervention of military force in democratic elections or their results, earning zealous praise from Allende's oppositional candidate of the Christian Democratic Party, Radomiro Tomic, for guarding the spirit of democracy and defending Chile from the "turbulent wave of bitter passion and violence" that came with Allende's victory. He encouraged further collaboration between the two parties in the future.

Allende used the doctrine as one of the bastions of his government, in order to keep the armed forces in line and prevent a possible coup d'état against his government. After Prats' resignation as Army Commander-in-chief, on August 23, 1973, Allende appointed General Augusto Pinochet as Army Commander-in-chief, and the doctrine was replaced by the notion of "National Security", which, coupled with the Chamber of Deputies Resolution the previous day, led to the Chilean coup of 1973 on September 11.

== Public reception ==
Despite the popular election victory of Allende, his name was not used in a positive manner by the general populace after his win was announced. Many stauch supporters of the Christian Democratic platform feared the spread of Marxism renouncing electoral and fiscal freedom. Cross-country marches were often the manifestation of this, though concerned citizens also made their voices heard in newspapers, on television, and over the radio. Though this did not slow his congressional confirmation, some view it the general unrest as precentfor widespread public endorsement of the Pinochet coup in 1973.

On the other hand, however, Allende's myriad of supporters looked upon the administration with anticipation for a future of lesser economic hardship than that seen under the leadership of the previous President, Eduardo Frei Montalva. His acceptance was shaped by a gradual yet significant shift in the Chilean voting demographic, including an influx of peasants and rural laborers to Santiago, creating one of the first large modern Latin American cities.

== Response to the doctrine ==
Due to the particularly close nature of this election, there was abundant governmental, as well as citizen, backlash to the confirmation of Salvador Allende as the President-Elect. The opposition to Allende's Popular Unity party, the Christian Democratic Party, organized at the grassroots level many demonstrations throughout the country but predominantly in the capital city of Santiago, where the presidential palace of La Moneda stood.

The Anti-Marxism among Christian Democratic representatives in Congress and growing fear of a CIA-backed military coup among top generals grew, more so after General Schneider's reiteration of the doctrine on September 19th, 1970.

Among the list of military officials involved in the assassination of Schneider was General Roberto Viaux, who had recently retired after heading the Tacnazo insurrection of 1969, and leader of the Santiago garrison, General Camilo Valenzuela. They joined the head of the national police force, General Vicente Huerta Celis, Admiral Hugo Tirado, in second command of the Chilean Navy, along with the second in command of the national Air Force, for numerous meetings concerning the venture. a main goal of these meetings was purportedly to keep the military unified throughout any potential endeavor against the executive-- this was the best possible chance at a successful coup d'etat.

Allende's predecessor, Eduardo Frei Montalva, and his original government were also consulted in the insurrectionist discussions. His party, the Christian Democratic Party, was insistent that his position enabled him to save the government from being "delivered to Communism" (which he viewed as the inevitable outcome of an Allende presidecy) and demanded that he take action. He gave General Viaux clearance for a coup in confidence, emphasizing that it must be carried out successfully lest he be forced to take retaliatory action in the public's interest. During this same time period, Tirado was promoted to Commander-in-Chief of the Chilean Navy, providing the conspirators some much-needed clout.

== Assassination of Schneider ==
Under guidance of the CIA, the conspirators planned to kidnap General Schneider in 1970 and frame Allende's Left for the act, hoping to turn more of Chile against the Popular Unity Party and take away their Congressional power. Instead, when the plans got out of hand, the group settled on assassination, which proved to have exact opposite consequences to what Viaux and his coalition had hoped to achieve originally. The public, yet to experience or be exposed to such bold political violence, rallied behind the Popular Unity front, guaranteeing the contested Congressional confirmation of Allende.

In response to the overwhelming consensus behind Allende's confirmation in Congress, the United States took further measures to outline a plan to oust him. Henry Kissinger led the efforts, formulating plans on taking measures against the Chilean government. He called the initiative a "correct and cool" one, recognizing the validity of Allende's election and legal right to presidency in public statements but planning gradual covert action to unseat him.

== See also ==
- Presidency of Allende
- Tacnazo
- List of commanders-in-chief of the Chilean Navy
