= Track II =

Track II can refer to:

- Project FUBELT – a CIA operation to oust Chilean President-elect Salvador Allende that was also known as Track II
- Track II diplomacy – an informal diplomatic process conducted by non-state actors
