= Camilo Valenzuela =

Chilean general

Camilo Valenzuela was a Chilean General and chief of the garrison in Santiago de Chile. In 1970, he led a group that with intent to stop the newly elected Salvador Allende from being inaugurated as president, tried to kidnap constitutionalist Army Commander-in-Chief René Schneider.

General Camilo Valenzuela met with other heads of the armed forces of Chile, previously contacted by the CIA or ONI, as Admiral José Toribio Merino. Other officials contacted were the Admiral Hugo Tirado, General of Carabineros Vicente Huerta Celis, Colonel Igualt and a group of civilians.

On October 19, 1970, the group, supplied with tear gas grenades delivered by the CIA, made an attempt to kidnap Schneider as he was leaving a bachelor party. But the attempt failed because Schneider left in a private car and not the expected official vehicle.

A second attempt October 20 was also unsuccessful. The CIA assured Valenzuela that "USG support for anti-Allende action continues." But they also concluded: "since Valenzuela’s group is apparently having considerable difficulty executing even the first step of its coup plan, the prospect for a coup succeeding or even occurring before 24 October [the day for the Congressional vote] now appears remote."

At 2 a.m., October 22, machine guns were handed over from the CIA to Valenzuela's group. But before Valenzuela could make a new kidnap attempt, Schneider was shot later that day by a group led by Roberto Viaux, and died three days later in hospital. (The weapons supplied to Valenzuela were not used in the killing.)

Following the shooting, Valenzuela was appointed "Jefe del Plaza for Law and Order"/chief of Santiago province and Schneider was succeeded by General Carlos Prats. On October 24, the Congress confirmed Allende as president. The attempts to prevent Salvador Allende from taking office had failed.

Military courts in Chile found that Schneider's death was caused by two military groups, one led by Roberto Viaux and the other by Camilo Valenzuela. Viaux and Valenzuela were convicted of charges of conspiring to cause a coup, and Viaux also was convicted of kidnapping. The CIA aided both groups, the lawsuit said.

== See also ==
- Project FUBELT
- United States intervention in Chile
