= Tacnazo insurrection =

Tacna artillery regiment revolt (1969)

El Tacnazo
- Part of the Cold War
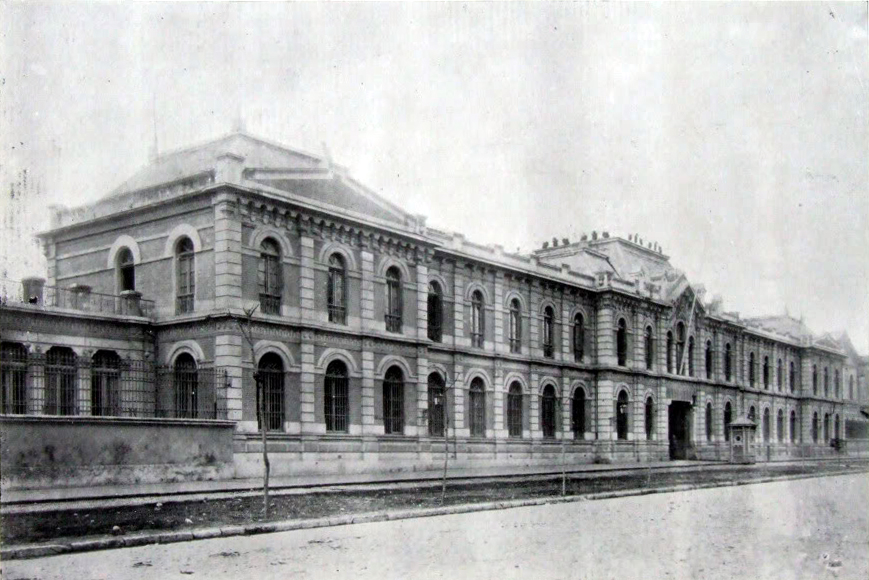
- Regimiento Tacna building in Santiago de Chile.
Date	October 21, 1969
Location	Chile
Action	Insurgents entrench in the Tacna Regiment Building
Result	Insurgents give up

Government-Insurgents
Eduardo Frei Montalva	Roberto Viaux

Political support
- All parties in Congress of Chile

Military support
Almost all Chilean Armed Forces	Tacna Regiment

The Tacnazo insurrection (October 21, 1969) (Spanish: El Tacnazo) was a brief revolt of the Tacna artillery regiment, led by General Roberto Viaux, in what turned out to be a non-violent demonstration against the government of Chilean President Eduardo Frei Montalva.

== Background ==
Around mid-1969, Brigadier General Roberto Viaux, commander of the First Army Division stationed in Antofagasta, asked "the opinion of the young officers" (colonels, lieutenant colonels, majors, and captains) and based on their answers, wrote a letter of petition to the Army Commander-in-chief, General Sergio Castillo Aránguiz, to be presented to President Eduardo Frei Montalva.

Viaux's letter said that "national security and internal peace in our country" depended on the armed forces, and "in our judgement" the Frei administration, like its predecessors, had not concerned itself with keeping a modern army in working order, "well equipped and taking real part in important decisions". The letter demanded that a new government policy toward the armed forces be put into effect, that senior officers' salaries be adjusted to conform to "their high social status and national responsibility" (in the letter, Viaux complained that "a general of the Republic earns less than a competent worker at the Chuquicamata copper mine", which was true), that adequate materiel be purchased, and that the higher echelons of the military hierarchy be given a prominent participatory role in the economic, political, and social development of Chile.

Viaux was confident that his letter would lead to a new dialogue with President Frei, because he had discussed it beforehand with the head of the Army's General Staff, Division General René Schneider. The letter had even made suggestions about the "participatory" role of the generals in the economic and political life of the country. Frei, however, did not listen to Schneider, but he did listen to Sergio Castillo, the commander in chief of the Army, an intimate personal friend and a political supporter above all else. Viaux was relieved of his command of the First Division on October 18, 1969, and recalled to Santiago.

== Events ==
On October 21, 1969, General Viaux became the head of a military insurrection localized in the Tacna Artillery Regiment in Santiago, with the support of the Sub-Officers' School, the Army War Academy, and part of the 2nd Armored Regiment. At noon, it was clear to the reporters covering the incident that General Viaux was counting on the covert support and sympathy of the majority of Santiago's officer corps, and that, technically, if Viaux suggested it, there was nothing to prevent the overthrow of Frei and his replacement by a military government without a shot being fired.

President Frei reacted by ending the legislative session of the congress, and declaring a state of emergency. However, after a phone conversation with the head of the Army General Staff, René Schneider, Viaux issued a statement in which he emphasized that "my movement is not against the President of the Republic," but rather was a last resort "to call attention" to the necessity of putting the Army in the place it deserved. The next day, October 22, Viaux ended his rebellion, having elicited the following concessions that were officialized in the so-called "Tacna agreement": the Chilean Army's commander-in-chief, General Sergio Castillo; the minister of Defense, General Tulio Marambio, would retire. General Schneider would become Army Commander-in-chief, and; the government would urgently upgrade the salaries of army personnel and the rest of the military budget.

Viaux accepted forced retirement for himself, since Schneider's presence as Commander-in-chief guaranteed that his petitions would be heard. After the negotiations Viaux surrendered himself to General Alfredo Mahn.

== Aftermath ==
General Schneider forced Frei to carry out part of Viaux's original petition: in January 1970, the generals' salaries were raised from an equivalent of six times the minimum wage to twelve times the minimum wage. (The minimum wage was fixed by law each year for state employees and private enterprise.) That is, the generals became part of the 2 percent of Chilean households with the highest income. They had belonged to the 10 percent with the highest income before. The military budget was raised by 50 percent for the following fiscal year, and plans to expand the number of officers in the three branches of the armed forces, the military police, and the civilian investigatory police were studied. (These plans were not put into effect until 1971, under Salvador Allende's administration.)

It was agreed that for their part the corps of Army generals would study long- and short-term "plans of action" to put into practice Viaux's demand that "the armed forces be given a real responsibility in solving national problems". During 1970 this plan was deferred by the generals themselves so they could concentrate on the means of intervening "in search of social peace", should the political struggle for the presidency erupt into violent confrontations between the various political factions, a situation that kept threatening throughout the year until September 4, 1970, the day of the presidential elections.

== See also ==
- Tanquetazo
- Schneider assassination
- History of Chile
- List of Chilean coups d'état
