= Project FUBELT =

1970–1973 CIA operations in Chile to suppress Salvador Allende

Coordinates: 38°57′06″N 77°08′48″W

- Part of United States intervention in Chile
- Type: Attempted military coup d'état
- Location: Chile
- Planned: 1970
- Planned by: Central Intelligence Agency
- Commanded by: Richard Nixon; Henry Kissinger
- Objective: Prevent the inauguration of socialist president-elect Salvador Allende
- Date: September 15, 1970 – November 9, 1970
- Executed by: General Roberto Viaux; General Camilo Valenzuela; Admiral Hugo Tirado
- Outcome: Failure
- Casualties: 1 killed (René Schneider)

Project FUBELT (also known as Track II) is the codename for the secret Central Intelligence Agency operations that were to prevent Salvador Allende's rise to power before his confirmation and to promote a military coup in Chile. This project came after the circumstantial failure of Track I, which involved making president Eduardo Frei Montalva interfere with the 1970 national election in opposition to Allende.

The highlights of Project FUBELT are cited in declassified US government documents released by the National Security Archive on September 11, 1998, 25 years after the coup, as well as in papers uncovered by a 1975 congressional inquiry.

Peter Kornbluh, a senior analyst at the National Security Archive and the director of the Chile Documentation Project, reveals in his book The Pinochet File the participation of the US in fomenting the military coup in Chile in the covert CIA Project FUBELT.

CIA memoranda and reports on Project FUBELT include meetings between United States National Security Advisor Henry Kissinger and CIA officials, CIA cables to its Santiago station, and summaries of secret action in 1970, detailing decisions and operations to undermine the election of Salvador Allende in September 1970 and to promote a military coup.

In November 1970, after the failure of the operation with the killing of general René Schneider, the US National Security Council issued National Security Decision Memorandum 93, which replaced FUBELT.

== Background ==
The US was particularly interested in the election of Salvador Allende because of his Marxist ideologies. Taking place during the Cold War and after the Cuban Revolution, then US president Richard Nixon was worried that Chile would become another communist link in Latin America. He authorized the CIA to involve itself in the Chilean national election of 1970. There were two plans in this involvement, Track I and Track II. After the circumstantial failure of Track I, Project FUBELT, being Track II, was pursued.

== Plan ==
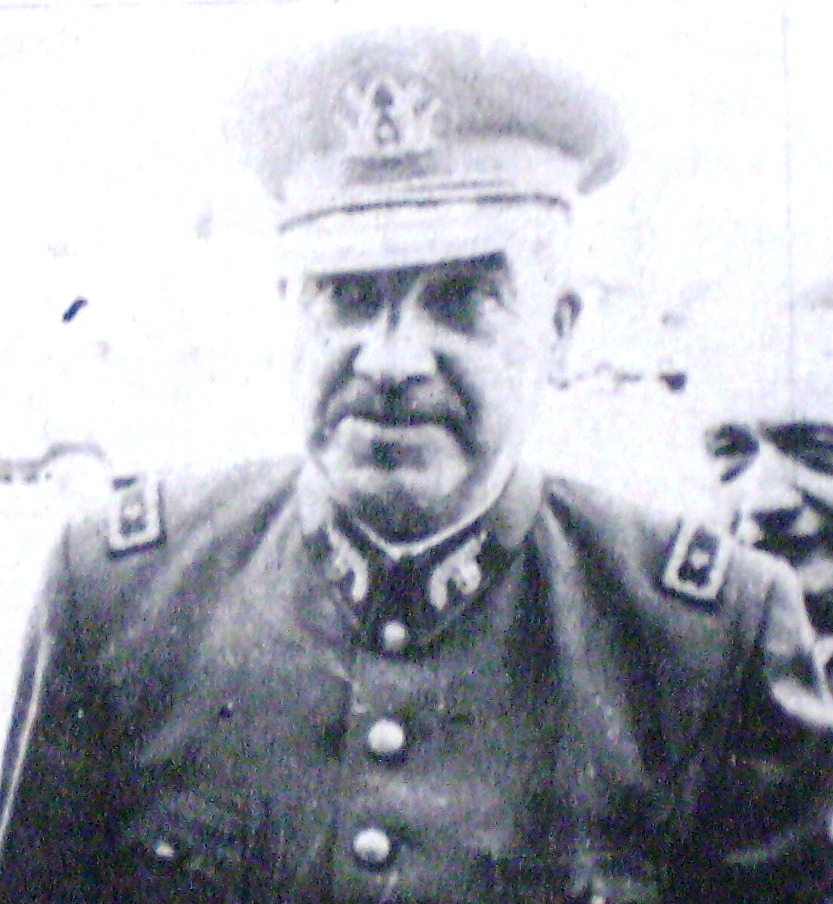
General René Schneider, whose kidnapping and killing was sponsored by the CIA

The operation itself was aimed at creating a 'coup-climate' in which a coup would best take place. This, as ordered by Richard Nixon, authorized $10 million to the CIA to conduct this operation. To this day, this is the only record in US history of a US president explicitly ordering the overthrow of a democratically elected leader in a foreign country. Several days after Nixon's 15 September directive to create a coup in Chile, the CIA began to plan economic, political, and psychological warfare tactics to create a climate in which a coup would thrive.

Then commander in chief, Gen. René Schneider, stood in the way of this operation because he was a constitutionalist and thus did not support a coup to overthrow Allende. As part of the plan to dispel any obstacles by Schneider, the CIA hired retired General Roberto Viaux, active General Camilo Valenzuela, and Admiral Hugo Tirado to kidnap René Schneider. This kidnapping was part of a longer plan by the CIA which included:

- Kidnapping General René Schneider
- Secretly flying Schneider to Argentina
- Replacing Schneider with a coup supporter
- Military would declare that kidnapping was the doing of Allende supporters
- Declare martial law
- Sweep through majority-lower-class areas where Allende's supporters resided, wiping out opposition
- Declaring elections null

Attached to this plan was a request for $50,000 to pay the three individuals who were going to kidnap Schneider. It is worth noting that there was no plan by the CIA to conduct a subsequent democratic election after this plan took place.

On October 22, the group of CIA-hired individuals attempted to kidnap the general, but instead ended up shooting him. He was taken to the military hospital in Santiago where he succumbed to his wounds three days later.

== Chilean reaction ==
The Chilean people were shocked by the attempted kidnapping and subsequent killing of General Schneider. This was used as a motivating force for the Chilean public to overwhelmingly support Chilean constitutionalism, and thus support the election of Allende on 3 November 1970.

== Continued US operations ==
In the face of overwhelming discontent from Chileans for the assassination of Schneider, the three hired to go through with the coup backed out. Two of three of these individuals were arrested in conspiracy, and the other, Hugo Tirado, was paid $35,000.

After the failure of Project FUBELT to create a coup before the election of Allende, the US State Department suggested that the US should accept Allende's election and work toward his defeat in the 1976 election. Nixon's national security advisor, Henry Kissinger, instead encouraged a more forceful reaction by the US. Kissinger justified this by claiming that Allende would try to swindle the US, saying that Allende wanted to "...Be internationally respectable, move cautiously and pragmatically, avoid immediate confrontation with [the US], move slowly in formalizing relations with Cuba and other socialist countries...".

Kissinger is also quoted telling Nixon, "The election of Allende poses one of the most serious challenges ever faced in this hemisphere, and your decision as to what to do may be the most historic and difficult foreign policy decision you will have to make this year".

=== Covert Operation Program for Chile ===
In response to Kissinger's forceful approach to dealing with Allende post-Track II failure, the US government went ahead with the 'Covert Operation Program for Chile,' which was a series of political and psychological warfare tactics aimed at creating disdain and opposition for Allende. The five points of this plan were as follows:

- Political action to divide and weaken the Allende coalition;
- Maintaining and enlarging contacts in the Chilean military;
- Providing support to non-Marxist opposition political groups and parties;
- Assisting certain periodicals and using other media outlets in Chile which can speak out against the Allende government and
- Using selected media outlets to play up Allende's subversion of the democratic process and involvement by Cuba and the Soviet Union in Chile.

== Revelations from declassified documents ==
Among the revelations in the formerly secret documents were the following:

- Handwritten notes, taken by CIA director Richard Helms, record the orders of President Richard Nixon, to foster a coup in Chile
- In the first meeting between Helms and high agency officials on the secret operations codenamed "FUBELT", a special task force under the supervision of CIA Deputy Director for Plans, Thomas Karamessines, is established, headed by veteran agent David Atlee Phillips. The memorandum notes that the CIA must prepare an action plan for National Security Advisor Henry Kissinger within 48 hours.
- Henry Kissinger, Thomas Karamessines and Alexander Haig (military assistant to Henry Kissinger), in a meeting on October 15, 1970, discuss promoting a coup in Chile, known as "Track II" of covert operations. Kissinger orders the CIA to "continue keeping the pressure on every Allende weak spot in sight.
- In a secret cable, Thomas Karamessines conveyed Kissinger's orders to CIA station chief in Santiago, Henry Hecksher: "It is firm and continuing policy that Allende be overthrown by a coup."
- The CIA ran a series of secret operations intended to push President Eduardo Frei Montalva to support "a military coup which would prevent Allende from taking office on 3 November."
- After Salvador Allende's election, the United States considered trying to get Chile expelled from the Organization of American States.
- Embassy officers and the State Department Policy Planning office called for the cutting off of economic and military assistance to Pinochet's government on human rights grounds, but were overruled by the Ambassador and officials of The Pentagon and Treasury Department.

== Repercussions to declassification ==
Many of the CIA documents recounting the events of this operation were released on 11 September 1998. Following this, on 10 September 2001, the relatives of assassinated general René Schneider filed a suit in the Federal Court of Washington DC, accusing Henry Kissinger of orchestrating the assassination of Schneider.

== See also ==
- CIA activities in Chile
- René Schneider#Assassination
- El Mercurio#CIA funding
