= René Schneider =

Chilean general (1913–1970)

Gen. René Schneider
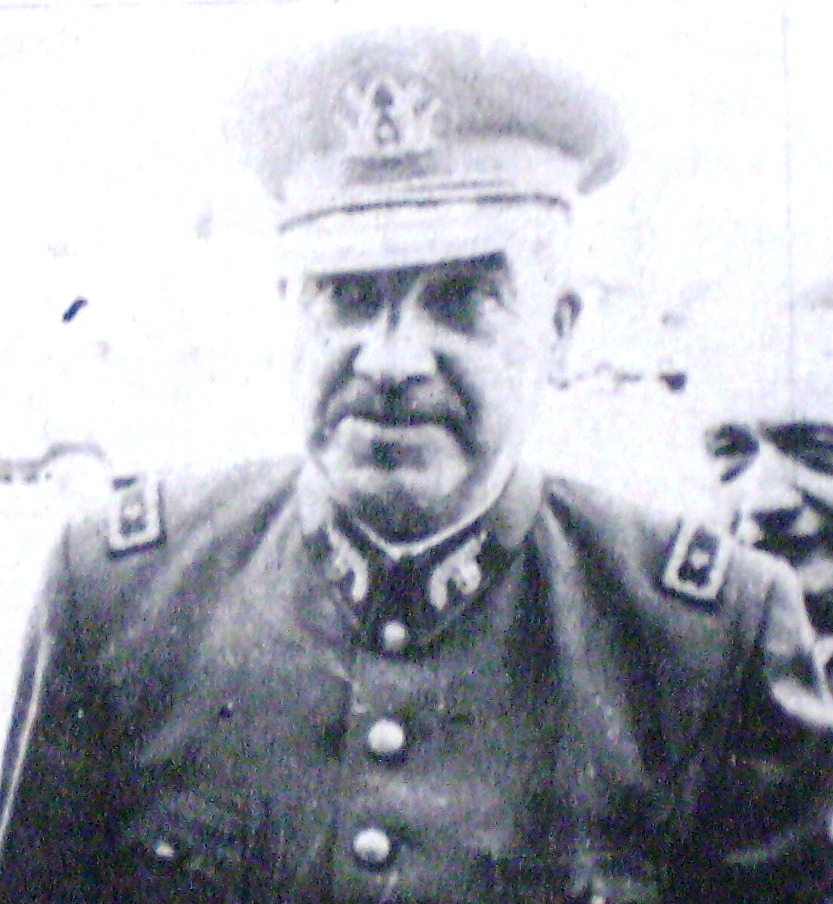

Commander-in-chief of the Chilean Army
- In office October 27, 1969 – October 25, 1970
- President: Eduardo Frei Montalva
- Preceded by: Sergio Castillo
- Succeeded by: Carlos Prats

Personal details
- Born: December 31, 1913 Concepción, Chile
- Died: October 25, 1970 (aged 56) Santiago, Chile
- Spouse: Carolina Elisa del Carmen Arce Durandeau (m. 1941)
- Children: 4

René Schneider Chereau (/ˈʃnaɪdər/ SHNY-dər; December 31, 1913 – October 25, 1970) was a Chilean military official who served as commander-in-chief of the Chilean Army at the time of the 1970 Chilean presidential election, when he was assassinated during a botched kidnapping attempt. He coined the doctrine of military-political mutual exclusivity that became known as the Schneider Doctrine.

== Early and personal life ==
René Schneider Chereau was born in Concepción, Chile to Víctor Schneider, an ethnic German immigrant, and Elisa Chereau Robert, a French immigrant, who worked in the tanning trade in the early 20th century in the city of Curicó. He completed his fifth year of humanities at the José Victorino Lastarria Boys' High School No. 5. After this, he entered the Military Academy at the age of 15 in 1929.

Schneider had been married to Carolina Elisa del Carmen Arce Durandeau since 1941, with whom he had four children: Elisa Carolina Leonor, Raúl Alfredo Leoncio, René Víctor Isaac, and Víctor Guillermo. He is also the great-grandfather of Emilia Schneider, the first transgender president of the Federation of Students of the University of Chile (Fech) and the first transgender parliamentarian in Chilean history.

Schneider was known among his friends for his good humor, simplicity, and solidarity. In 1948, he gave half of a lottery prize he won to a classmate who was experiencing financial difficulties. Carlos Prats, a friend and fellow soldier of Schneider, spoke of him in a 1985 memoir:

René Schneider was a friend through and through. With a profound professional vocation, his evident intelligence, and the common sense with which he faced the most complex problems gave a sense of security and self-confidence, which stimulated the solidarity of those of us who collaborated with him on specific tasks. Austere in his habits and with great sensitivity, he knew how to ease the tensions of his position by concentrating in his few free moments on reading, classical music, or oil painting, his favorite hobby.

== Military career ==
He entered the Military School as a cadet on February 20, 1930, completing his secondary education there. Graduating as an Infantry Second Lieutenant in December 1930, he was assigned to the 1st Infantry Regiment "Buin" and then briefly transferred to the 7th Infantry Regiment "Esmeralda" in Copiapó, the city that garrisoned this regiment at the time and which, as a final tribute, built a park in the name of General Schneider.

As a lieutenant, he served between 1941 and 1944 as an Instructor Officer at the Military School and then in the 2nd Infantry Regiment Maipo. In the latter assignment, he rose to Captain, and in the following years served as a student at the War Academy, an Officer at the Infantry School, a Staff Officer, and a professor at the War Academy. He was promoted to Army Major in 1951 and later became Secretary of Studies at the Academy and Professor of General Tactics at the same institute. In 1953, he served a posting to the Chilean Military Mission in Washington. In 1956, he served as Secretary of Studies at the Military Academy. In 1957, with the rank of lieutenant colonel, he resumed his teaching duties at the War Academy.

In 1963, he was appointed commander of the 18th Infantry Regiment "Guardia Vieja" and, that same year, military attaché to the Chilean Embassy in Paraguay, simultaneously joining the Army General Staff. As a colonel, he served as director of the Military Academy during 1967 and head of the Operations Department of the Army General Staff. In 1968, he was promoted to Brigadier General. On October 27, 1969, he was appointed Commander-in-Chief of the 5th Army Division in Punta Arenas by President Eduardo Frei Montalva, as a result of the Tacna agreement.

Schneider had expressed firm opposition to the idea of preventing Salvador Allende's inauguration by means of a coup d'état; as a constitutionalist, he wished to continue the Chilean military's long apolitical history.

== Assassination ==
After the 1970 Chilean presidential election, a plot to kidnap Schneider was developed. "Neutralizing" Schneider became a key prerequisite for a military coup because the general opposed any intervention by the armed forces to block Allende's constitutional election. The U.S. Central Intelligence Agency (CIA), which considered Schneider "a major stumbling block for military officers seeking to carry out a coup," supplied a group of Chilean officers led by General Camilo Valenzuela with "sterile" weapons for the kidnapping which was to be blamed on Allende supporters.

=== First and second attempts ===
On October 16, 1970, based on an anonymous tip as to Schneider's whereabouts, the first group attempted to kidnap him from his home. The tip turned out to be a false one as Schneider had been on vacation for two days prior and did not return until the next day.

On the evening of October 19, 1970, a second group of coup-plotters loyal to General Roberto Viaux, equipped with tear gas grenades attempted to grab Schneider as he left an official dinner. The attempt failed because Schneider left in a private car, not his official vehicle. The failure produced an extremely significant cable from CIA headquarters in Washington to the local station, asking for urgent action because "Headquarters must respond during morning 20 October to queries from high levels." Payments of $50,000 each to Viaux and his chief associate were then authorised on the condition that another kidnapping attempt be made.

=== Final attempt ===
On October 22, 1970, the coup-plotters again attempted to kidnap Schneider. His official car was ambushed at an intersection in the capital city of Santiago. Schneider drew a gun to defend himself, and was shot point-blank several times. According to a report by the Chilean military police, "five individuals, one of whom, making use of a blunt instrument similar to a sledgehammer, broke the rear window and then fired at General Schneider, striking him in the region of the spleen, in the left shoulder, and in the left wrist." He was rushed to a military hospital, but the wounds proved fatal and he died three days later, on October 25.

His assassination provoked national outrage and inspired the citizens and the military to rally around the just-elected Allende, who was ratified by the Chilean Congress on October 24.

Military courts in Chile found that Schneider's death was caused by two military groups, one led by Viaux and the other by General Camilo Valenzuela. Viaux and Valenzuela were eventually convicted of charges of conspiring to cause a coup, and Viaux also was convicted of kidnapping. The lawsuit asserted that the CIA had aided both groups, but the charges were deemed not-satisfactorily-proven. Peter Kornbluh, director of the National Security Archive's Chile Documentation Project, asserts that CIA documents show "Viaux was not acting independently or unilaterally, but clearly as a co-conspirator with Valenzuela..."

On October 26, 1970, President Eduardo Frei Montalva named General Carlos Prats as Commander-in-Chief to replace Schneider. This happened at the same time that $35,000 was given by the CIA to the kidnappers "to keep the prior contact secret, maintain the goodwill of the group, and for humanitarian reasons."

== Lawsuits ==
On September 10, 2001, Schneider's family filed a suit against Henry Kissinger, accusing him of collaborating with Viaux in arranging for Schneider's murder. While declassified documents show the CIA, displeased with the socialist victory, had explored the idea of supporting Viaux in a coup attempt, they also show that the agency decided on tracking down other members of the Chilean military, deciding that a Viaux coup would fail. Nevertheless, Viaux, acting on the advice of the CIA, teamed up with other coup plotters. CIA documents show unwavering support for Viaux's co-conspirator, Camilo Valenzuela, and also show a $50,000 payment to the kidnap team Viaux had hired. Documents written at the time of the assault on Schneider describe it as part of the "Valenzuela group coup plan." On October 15, 1970 Kissinger allegedly told U.S. President Richard Nixon that he had "turned off" plans to support Viaux, explaining that "Nothing could be worse than an abortive coup." The CIA claimed that no such "stand-down" order was ever received.

The U.S. government claims it did not intend for Schneider to be murdered, only kidnapped. When Alexander Haig, Kissinger's aide, was asked "is kidnapping not a crime?" he replied "that depends." Such an argument would carry no weight in any court of law. Christopher Hitchens noted that Chilean authorities treated the crime as a straightforward murder. He argued that, "under the law of every law-bound country (including the United States), a crime committed in the pursuit of a kidnapping is thereby aggravated, not mitigated. You may not say, with a corpse at your feet, 'I was only trying to kidnap him.'"

The lawsuit against Kissinger was eventually dismissed in the federal district court; the dismissal was subsequently upheld by the D.C. Court of Appeals. A petition for a writ of certiorari to the United States Supreme Court was denied.

== See also ==
- Family Jewels (Central Intelligence Agency)
- Project FUBELT
- CIA activities in Chile
