= 1970 Chilean presidential election =

- 4 September 1970
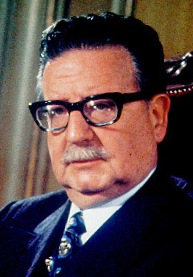

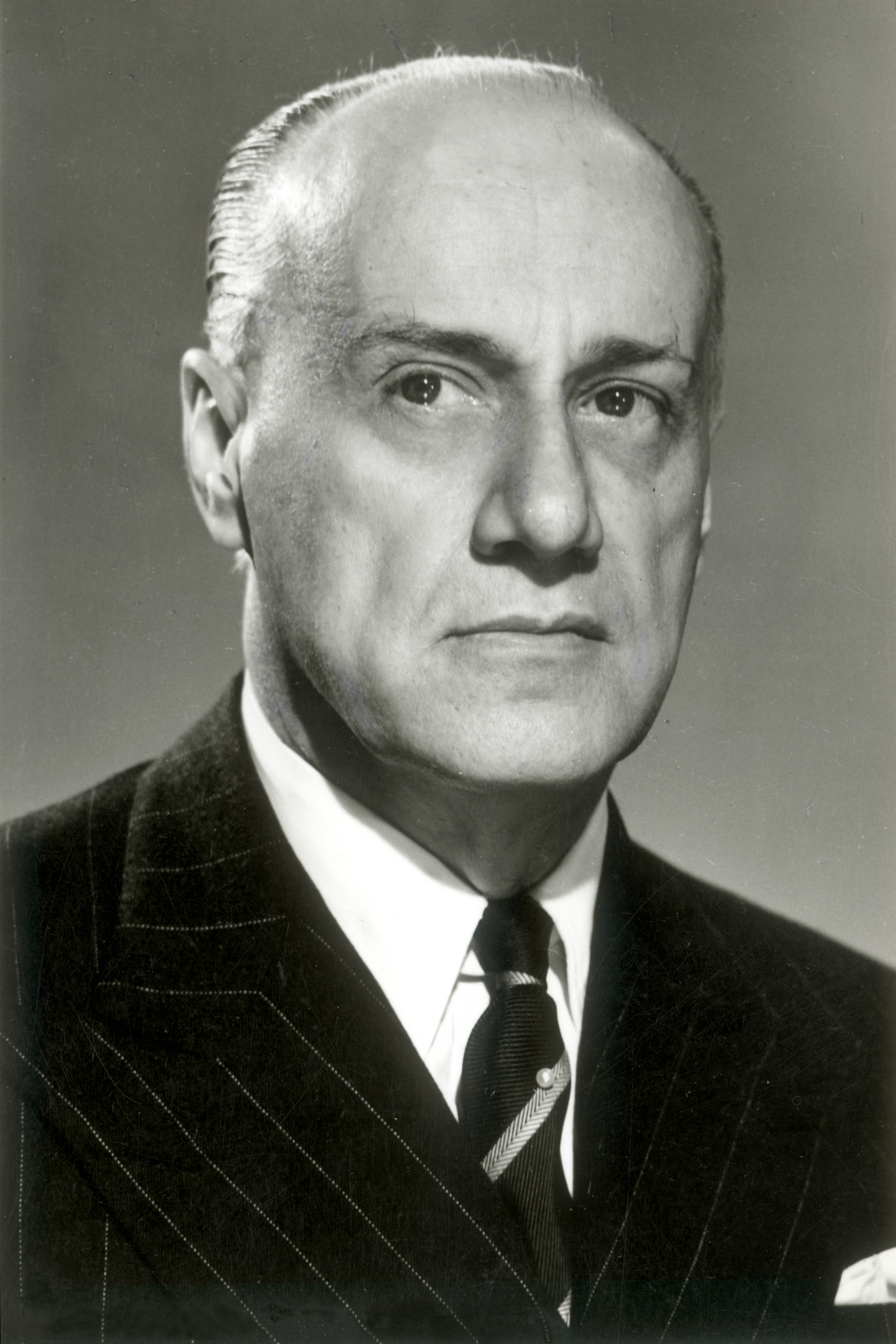

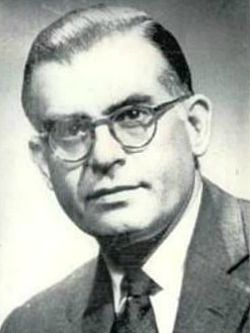
Nominee	Salvador Allende	Jorge Alessandri	Radomiro Tomic
Party	Socialist	Independent	PDC
Alliance	Popular Unity	PN–DR
Popular vote	1,070,334	1,031,159	821,801
Percentage	36.61%	35.27%	28.11%
Congress vote	153	35
President before election
Eduardo Frei Montalva
PDC
Elected President
Salvador Allende
Socialist

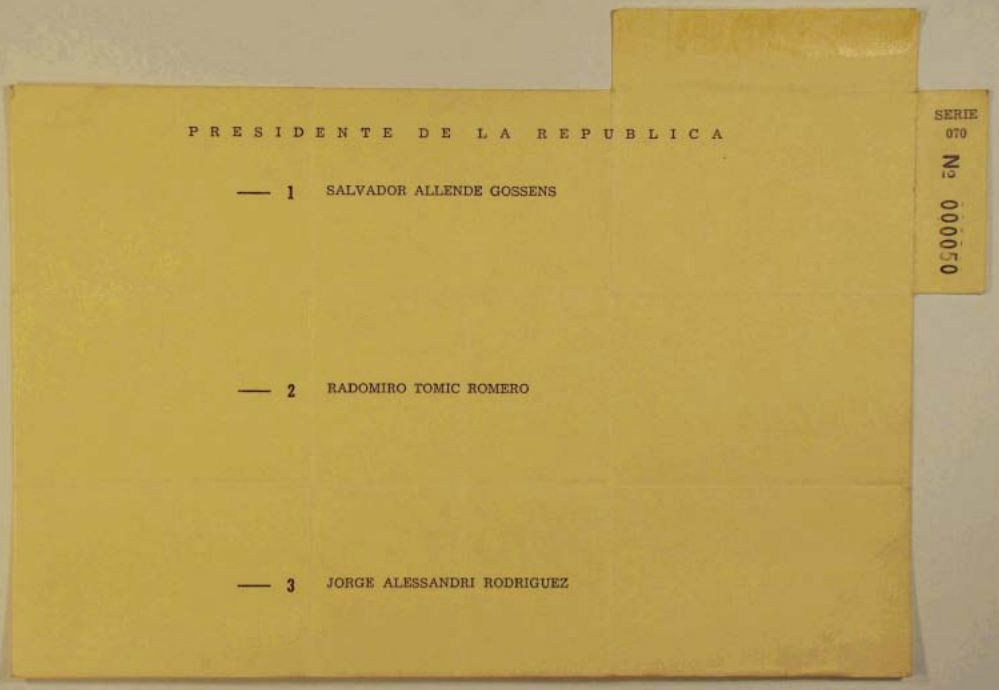
Original ballot

Presidential elections were held in Chile on 4 September 1970. Salvador Allende of the Popular Unity alliance won a narrow plurality in a race against independent Jorge Alessandri and Christian Democrat Radomiro Tomic. Allende's victory was confirmed by a contingent election after the Christian Democrats voted in favor of his candidacy.

Both the United States and the Soviet Union invested money into the election through their intelligence agencies and other sources. The US attempted to sabotage Allende's campaign while the Soviets supported him. US ambassador Edward M. Korry played a major role in anti-Allende campaigns during the election.

Eduardo Frei Montalva and his Christian Democratic Party later united with Allende's opponents to form a congressional majority in an attempt to declare his presidency illegal in August 1973, catalyzing the military coup a few weeks later.

== Electoral system ==
The election was held using the absolute majority system, under which a candidate had to receive over 50% of the popular vote to be elected. If no candidate received over 50% of the vote, both houses of the National Congress would come together to vote on the two candidates who received the most votes.

== Campaign ==
=== Salvador Allende ===
Allende was a self-described Marxist and lifetime member of the Chilean Socialist Party. He had a career in politics that included being a senator and three consecutive bids for the presidency prior to the 1970 election cycle. In 1970, he ran for the Popular Unity coalition, a political alliance consisting of the leftists of Chile, including the Chilean Communist Party and the Socialist Party. His platform included 40 promises that would benefit the lower class, including ending inflation, greatly reducing the cost of medicine, and adjusting public housing rent. The remaining promises also aligned with the socialist ideology of Allende and the Popular Unity coalition.

=== Radomiro Tomic ===
Radomiro Tomic was a major figure in the Christian Democratic Party and served as ambassador to Washington under President Eduardo Frei. As a longtime friend of Frei, he was appointed as an ambassador to position him for candidacy for the party in 1970. He was ideologically to the left of President Frei. He spent a large portion of his political career campaigning for a coalition between Christian Democrats and leftists, despite most members of both groups consistently opposing his idea. He was known for being egotistical but nonetheless a very charismatic speaker. His campaign benefited from the prestige of being ambassador to Washington, as well as his friendship with President Frei. However, it was hurt by his continued insistence on forming a coalition and his direct criticism of the Christian Democratic Party's own bills and the Frei administration's reforms. Voters often turned away from him due to his confusing campaign platform, which came off as a more convoluted way of implementing socialism compared to electing the Marxist Allende.

=== Jorge Alessandri ===
Prior to running in the 1970 election, Jorge Alessandri was a career politician and served as the 27th president of Chile from 1958 to 1964, until the constitution barred him from succeeding himself. He was the predecessor to Christian Democrat Eduardo Frei. His conservative independent platform represented voters who were concerned by the reforms Frei had implemented over the course of his administration. Due to his prestige as a former president of Chile, his campaign started out very strong. However, over time, he lost support for a variety of reasons.

One major factor was his age and health. At the time of the 1970 election, Alessandri was 74 years old and had experienced a variety of health issues, both mental and physical. According to Sergio Riesenberg, Alessandri's appearance on TV backfired and cost him the election. On the TV program Tres Bandas, hosted by Gonzalo Bertrán, there were two separate shots that showed him in a bad light. In the first, Alessandri said that he would be determined and that his "hands would not shake," but the camera focused on his hands, which were actually shaking. In the second frame, he was seen next to a stove warming his legs with a blanket despite it being spring. According to Riesenberg, this gave the public the impression of a man who was no longer of "an adequate age to become president."

Another major factor was his campaign being staffed mostly by amateurs, which led to the wasting of resources, ineffective propaganda, issues mobilizing supporters, and trouble spreading a positive message to voters. US intelligence reports stated that supporters believed Alessandri could win using his name alone and spent most of the campaign attacking Frei's reforms instead of directly promoting Alessandri. In the end, he finished second, meaning that the congressional vote was between him and Allende.

== International involvement ==
=== Intelligence agencies ===
Both the Central Intelligence Agency (CIA) and the KGB spent significant amounts of money to influence the outcome of the election.

The CIA did not provide direct assistance to any candidate, as they had during the 1964 elections, but rather focused on anti-Allende propaganda, and the 40 Committee approved $435,000 for that purpose. In fact, that represented only about half the money spent by the CIA to influence the election; the Church Committee put the total amount at between $800,000 and $1 million. The money approved by the 40 Committee was used in a "scare campaign" of posters and pamphlets linking an Allende victory with the violence and repression associated with the Soviet Union. Editorials and news stories reinforcing this message were also written with CIA guidance, especially in the newspaper El Mercurio, and disseminated throughout the national media. The goal was to contribute to and exploit the political polarization and financial panic of the period. Besides propaganda, the CIA also funded an attempt to splinter the Radical Party away from the Popular Unity coalition. This CIA campaign was very inefficient. CIA director Richard Helms complained that he was ordered by the White House to "beat somebody with nobody." Although the 40 Committee had decided not to support any candidate directly, the CIA did help US companies in funding candidates. In total, US businesses spent about $700,000; half of that sum was provided by the International Telephone & Telegraph Corporation (ITT).

KGB money was more precisely targeted. Allende made a personal request for Soviet money through his personal contact, KGB officer Svyatoslav Kuznetsov, who urgently came to Chile from Mexico City to help Allende. The original allocation of money for these elections through the KGB was $400,000, and an additional personal subsidy of $50,000 was given directly to Allende. It is believed that help from the KGB was a decisive factor, as Allende won by a narrow margin of 39,000 votes out of a total of 3 million cast. After the elections, the KGB director Yuri Andropov obtained permission for additional money and other resources from the Central Committee of the CPSU to ensure Allende's victory in Congress. In his request on 24 October, he stated that the KGB "will carry out measures designed to promote the consolidation of Allende's victory and his election to the post of President of the country."

US president Richard Nixon was enraged by Allende's victory and the failure of the CIA's covert actions against him.

=== US ambassador ===
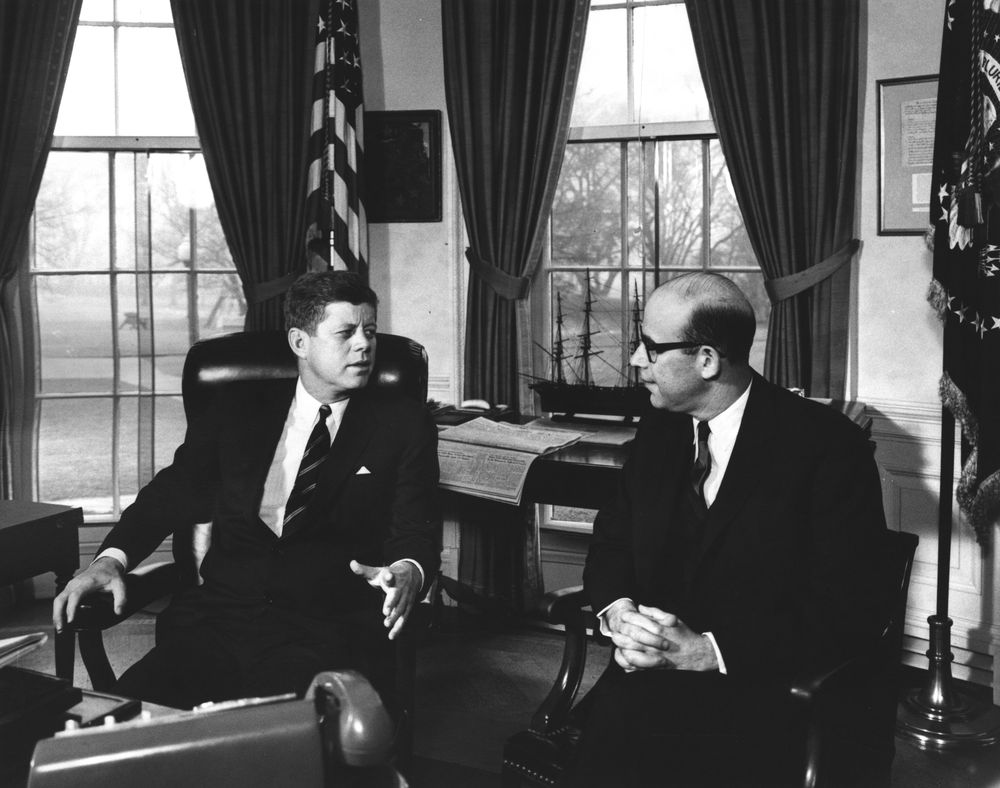
Ambassador Korry with John F. Kennedy

Edward M. Korry was the United States ambassador to Chile from 1967 to 1971, during which he was very involved in Chilean politics, particularly the 1970 elections. During the elections, he spent time analyzing each candidate and their campaigns and would report back to the State Department, making recommendations on how to handle involvement. On many occasions, he expressed that he strongly believed Allende was a major threat to the United States. He believed that an anti-Allende campaign was necessary to prevent the formation of a Leninist state in Chile and even advocated for its expansion throughout the election. A major basis for expanding it was the trends occurring in the election, namely the rapid decline of Alessandri's campaign, the continued stagnation of Tomic's, and the growing support for Allende, much of which came from voters moving away from Alessandri and Tomic. He did not believe that the people of Chile or US private businesses would be able to do enough to stop Allende's election.

Korry was very actively involved with the Christian Democrats and the Frei administration, quickly developing a close relationship with Frei. At the request of Frei, he became more directly involved in Tomic's campaign, as Frei was becoming frustrated with Tomic's frequent criticism of the party he was running for, as well as his increasingly leftist views. One major point of involvement was attempting to stop Tomic from continuing to advocate for an alliance with the Soviet Union. Over time, Korry would become frustrated with Tomic as well, a bad sign for US relations if Tomic had become president.

Korry was later accused of involvement in the 1973 coup due to his vocal criticism of Allende, despite not being involved, with his innocence only being acknowledged by major media outlets in 1981. He strongly opposed any military intervention in Chile, both immediately after the election and three years later when Pinochet came to power.

=== Track I and Track II ===
The United States executive branch had two plans to prevent Allende from ascending to power if he won the vote. Track I was led by the State Department and involved manipulation of Chilean politics within the bounds of the Chilean constitution to lead to President Frei being re-elected. The CIA was not involved with it. Track II, or Project FUBELT, was a CIA operation that did not involve the State Department or Department of Defense, consisting of forming and supporting a group within the Chilean military who would stage a coup. Circumstantially, Track I was not possible, so the United States moved forward with Project FUBELT.

== Results ==
As none of the candidates received an absolute majority in the public vote, the National Congress had to decide between the two candidates who had received the most votes: Allende and Alessandri. In the three previous instances since 1932 where this situation had arisen, Congress had simply chosen the candidate with the highest number of votes. Former President Alessandri, in fact, had been elected in 1958 with 31.6% of the popular vote, defeating Allende.

However, in this case, there was an active campaign against Allende's confirmation by Congress, including an intensified propaganda effort by the CIA to raise concerns about Chile's future. During this period, the CIA produced over 726 articles, broadcasts, and similar items. The CIA also encouraged international economic pressure against Chile. Additionally, the United States began laying the groundwork for a military coup, authorizing the Ambassador to Chile to promote this outcome through his contacts in the Chilean military.

In the summer before the election, reports indicated that out of the 200 senators and deputies in Congress, Allende had 82 supporters, including the 80 members of Popular Unity, a major organizing force in the coalition. Tomic had 75 supporters following Allende, while Alessandri's remaining supporters amounted to 43 out of the 200 congresspeople.

Two days prior to the confirmation, Army Commander-in-Chief General René Schneider was shot while resisting a kidnapping attempt by a group led by General Roberto Viaux. Schneider, hospitalized as a result, succumbed to his wounds three days later. The CIA had supported Viaux's kidnapping plan through Project FUBELT. Schneider was known for defending the "constitutionalist" doctrine, which held that the army's role is exclusively professional and aimed at protecting the country's sovereignty, not interfering in politics. He had vehemently opposed organizing a coup d'état if Salvador Allende was ultimately chosen by the National Congress as president.

Schneider's death was viewed unfavorably by the public and rallied citizens and military personnel in support of Allende. Ultimately, on 24 October, the National Congress chose Allende as the President. On 26 October, President Eduardo Frei appointed General Carlos Prats as the new commander in chief of the army, succeeding René Schneider. Prats himself resigned in August 1973, and Allende appointed General Augusto Pinochet, then presumed to be loyal to Allende, as his successor; a few weeks later, Pinochet would overthrow Allende in the 1973 Chilean coup d'état and lead the resulting military junta.

Allende's presidency was eventually ratified after he agreed to sign a "Statute of Constitutional Guarantees," pledging not to undermine the constitution.

Candidate	Party	Popular vote		Congress vote	
Candidate	Party	Votes	%	Votes	%
Salvador Allende	Popular Unity	1,070,334	36.61	153	81.38
Jorge Alessandri	Independent (National Party)	1,031,159	35.27	35	18.62
Radomiro Tomic	Christian Democratic Party	821,801	28.11		
Total		2,923,294	100.00	188	100.00
Valid votes		2,923,294	98.93	188	96.41
Invalid/blank votes		31,505	1.07	7	3.59
Total votes		2,954,799	100.00	195	100.00
Registered voters/turnout		3,539,747	83.47	200	97.50
Source: Servel, Tricel, Nohlen, Base de datos de elecciones en Chile

== See also ==
- History of Chile
- United States intervention in Chile
- Politics of Chile
