= Roberto Viaux =

Chilean army general (1917–2005)

Roberto Urbano Viaux Marambio (May 25, 1917 in Talca – September 5, 2005 in Santiago) was a Chilean Army General and the primary planner of two attempted coups d'état in Chile in 1969 and 1970. The first was against President Eduardo Frei Montalva, and the second sought to prevent Socialist Salvador Allende's election.

== Biography ==
Prior to his involvement in the René Schneider case, Viaux was a very well respected and admired military leader. He became famous when he led a small military insurrection (the Tacnazo) on October 21, 1969. In the Tacnazo, Viaux shut himself up with the Tacna regiment inside its barracks and went on a strike. He demanded a pay-raise for the Army and the resignation of both the Defense Minister and the Army Commander-in-Chief. After tense negotiations with the government, he ended his strike when the Commander-in-Chief resigned and the government promised to study his salary demands.

On October 22, 1970, coup plotters loyal to Viaux attempted to kidnap constitutionalist Chilean Army Commander-in-chief General René Schneider, who was adamantly opposed to any prospect of a coup. General Schneider's official car was ambushed at a street intersection in the capital city of Santiago, Chile. When the general drew a gun to defend himself, he was shot point-blank several times. Though he was rushed to a military hospital, General Schneider's wounds proved fatal and he died three days later, on October 25. General Viaux was later convicted of involvement with the plot and imprisoned.

Critics of U.S. policy in Chile at the time, including journalist Christopher Hitchens, have accused former U.S. National Security Advisor and Secretary of State Henry Kissinger of conspiring with Viaux in the murder of General Schneider. Yet declassified U.S. documents show that the Central Intelligence Agency had explored the possibility of supporting a Viaux coup but decided that his ideology was "far out" and, while maintaining contact with him, did not provide direct support. In a declassified October 15 conversation with President Richard Nixon, Kissinger said, "This looks hopeless. I turned it off. Nothing could be worse than an abortive coup."

Although contact with the Viaux group was ended, a cable from CIA headquarters to the Santiago station reveals that the CIA did arrange the delivery of submachine guns and ammunition to a group led by General Valenzuela; Schneider was shot later that same day. The weapons, along with $50,000, were later recovered by U.S. military attaché to Chile Colonel Wilmert after he "pistol-whipped" General Valenzuela, who at first refused to hand the money over. Wilmert then drove to Vina del Mar, where he threw the submachine guns into the Pacific Ocean.

In August 1973, Viaux was released and exiled to Paraguay. He was not involved in the successful Chilean coup of 1973, and was allowed to return to Chile only in 1990, by President Patricio Aylwin. Viaux lived quietly in retirement in Santiago until his death on September 5, 2005.

== See also ==
- 1970 Chilean presidential election
- Carlos Prats
- Camilo Valenzuela
