= Salvador Allende =

President of Chile from 1970 to 1973

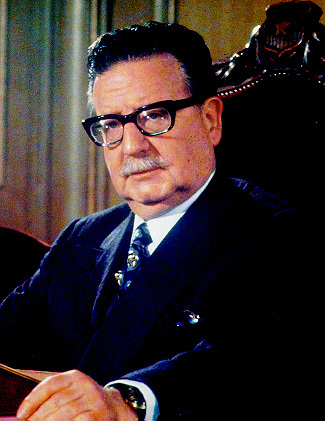
- Official portrait, 1970

29th President of Chile
- In office 3 November 1970 – 11 September 1973
- Preceded by: Eduardo Frei Montalva
- Succeeded by: Augusto Pinochet

56th President of the Senate of Chile
- In office 27 December 1966 – 15 May 1969
- Preceded by: Tomás Reyes Vicuña
- Succeeded by: Tomás Pablo Elorza

Member of the Senate
- In office 15 May 1969 – 3 November 1970
- Preceded by: Constituency established
- Succeeded by: Adonis Sepúlveda
- Constituency: Chiloé, Aysén and Magallanes
- In office 15 May 1961 – 15 May 1969
- Preceded by: Carlos Alberto Martínez
- Succeeded by: Hugo Ballesteros Reyes
- Constituency: Aconcagua and Valparaíso
- In office 15 May 1953 – 15 May 1961
- Preceded by: Elías Lafertte
- Succeeded by: Raúl Ampuero
- Constituency: Tarapacá and Antofagasta
- In office 15 May 1945 – 15 May 1953
- Preceded by: Luis Concha Rodríguez
- Succeeded by: Aniceto Rodríguez
- Constituency: Valdivia, Osorno, Llanquihue, Chiloé, Aysén and Magallanes

Secretary of the Socialist Party of Chile
- In office January 1943 – July 1944
- Preceded by: Marmaduke Grove
- Succeeded by: Bernardo Ibáñez

Minister of Health and Social Welfare
- In office 28 September 1939 – 2 April 1942
- President: Pedro Aguirre Cerda
- Preceded by: Miguel Etchebarne
- Succeeded by: Eduardo Escudero

Member of the Chamber of Deputies
- In office 15 May 1937 – 28 September 1939
- Preceded by: Humberto Casali
- Succeeded by: Vasco Valdebenito
- Constituency: Quillota and Valparaíso

Personal details
- Born: Salvador Guillermo Allende Gossens; 26 June 1908 Santiago, Chile
- Died: 11 September 1973 (aged 65) Santiago, Chile
- Cause of death: Suicide by gunshot
- Resting place: Santiago General Cemetery
- Party: Socialist Party of Chile
- Other political affiliations: Popular Unity Coalition; Popular Action Front
- Spouse: Hortensia Bussi (m. 1940)
- Children: 3, including Beatriz and Isabel
- Relatives: Allende family
- Education: University of Chile
- Profession: Civil servant; medical doctor
- Website: Foundation

Salvador Guillermo Allende Gossens (Note: US: /ɑːˈjɛndeɪ, -di/ ah-YEND-ay, -ee, UK: /æˈ-, aɪˈɛn-/; Latin American Spanish: [salβaˈðoɾ ɣiˈʝeɾmo aˈʝende ˈɣosens]) (26 June 1908 – 11 September 1973) was a Chilean politician who served as the 29th president of Chile from 1970 until his suicide during the 1973 Chilean coup d'état. He has been described as the first Marxist to be elected president in a liberal democracy in Latin America. Due to his commitment to democracy in the pursuit of socialism, and the manner of his death and deposition, he is revered as a hero and martyr by many socialists worldwide, across many different strains of beliefs, to a degree unusual in socialist politics.

Allende's involvement in Chilean politics spanned a period of nearly forty years, during which he held various positions including senator, deputy, and cabinet minister. As a life-long committed member of the Socialist Party of Chile, whose foundation he had actively contributed to, he unsuccessfully ran for the national presidency in the 1952, 1958, and 1964 elections. In 1970, he won the presidency as the candidate of the Popular Unity coalition in a close three-way race. He was elected in a run-off by Congress, as no candidate had gained a majority. In office, Allende pursued a policy he called "The Chilean Path to Socialism". The coalition government was far from unanimous. Allende said that he was committed to democracy and represented the more moderate faction of the Socialist Party, while the radical wing sought a more radical course. Instead, the Communist Party of Chile favored a gradual and cautious approach that sought cooperation with Christian democrats, which proved influential for the Italian Communist Party and the Historic Compromise.

As president, Allende sought to nationalize major industries, expand education, and improve the living standards of the working class. He clashed with the right-wing parties that controlled Congress and with the judiciary. On 11 September 1973, the military moved to oust Allende's democratically elected government in a coup d'état supported by the CIA. Declassified documents showed that US president Richard Nixon and his national security advisor Henry Kissinger were aware of the military's plans to overthrow Allende in the days before the coup d'état. As troops surrounded La Moneda Palace, Allende gave his last speech vowing not to resign. Later that day, Allende died by suicide in his office; the exact circumstances of his death are still disputed. (Note: The precise matter of Allende's death is a subject of controversy. After decades of suspicions that Allende might have been assassinated by the Chilean Armed Forces, a Chilean court in 2011 authorized the exhumation and autopsy of Allende's remains. A team of international experts examined the remains and concluded that Allende had shot himself with an AK-47 assault rifle.)

Following Allende's death, General Augusto Pinochet refused to return authority to a civilian government, and Chile was later ruled by the Government Junta, ending more than four decades of uninterrupted democratic governance, a period known as the Presidential Republic. The military junta that took over dissolved Congress, suspended the Constitution of 1925, and initiated a program of persecuting alleged dissidents, in which at least 3,095 civilians disappeared or were killed. Pinochet's military dictatorship only ended after the successful internationally backed 1989 constitutional referendum led to the peaceful Chilean transition to democracy.

== Early life ==
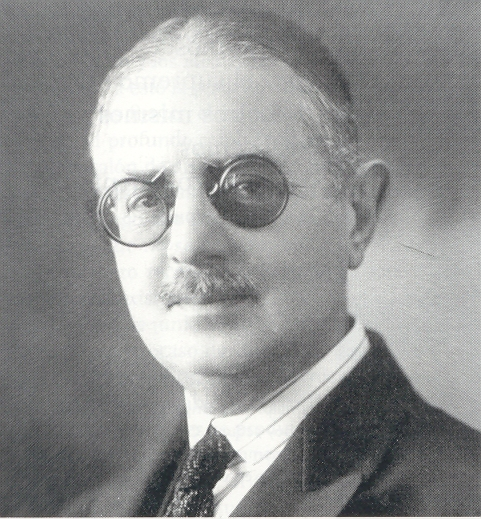
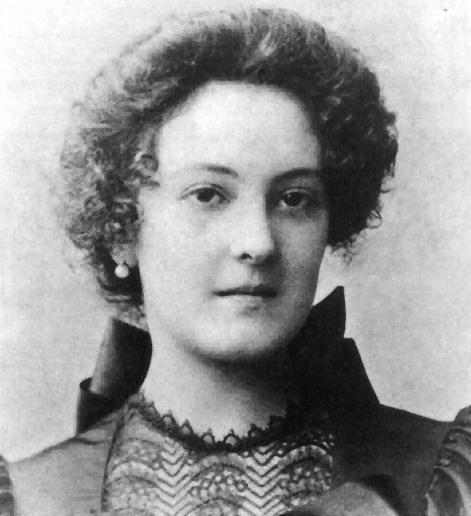
Salvador Allende Castro and Laura Gossens Uribe, the parents of Salvador Allende

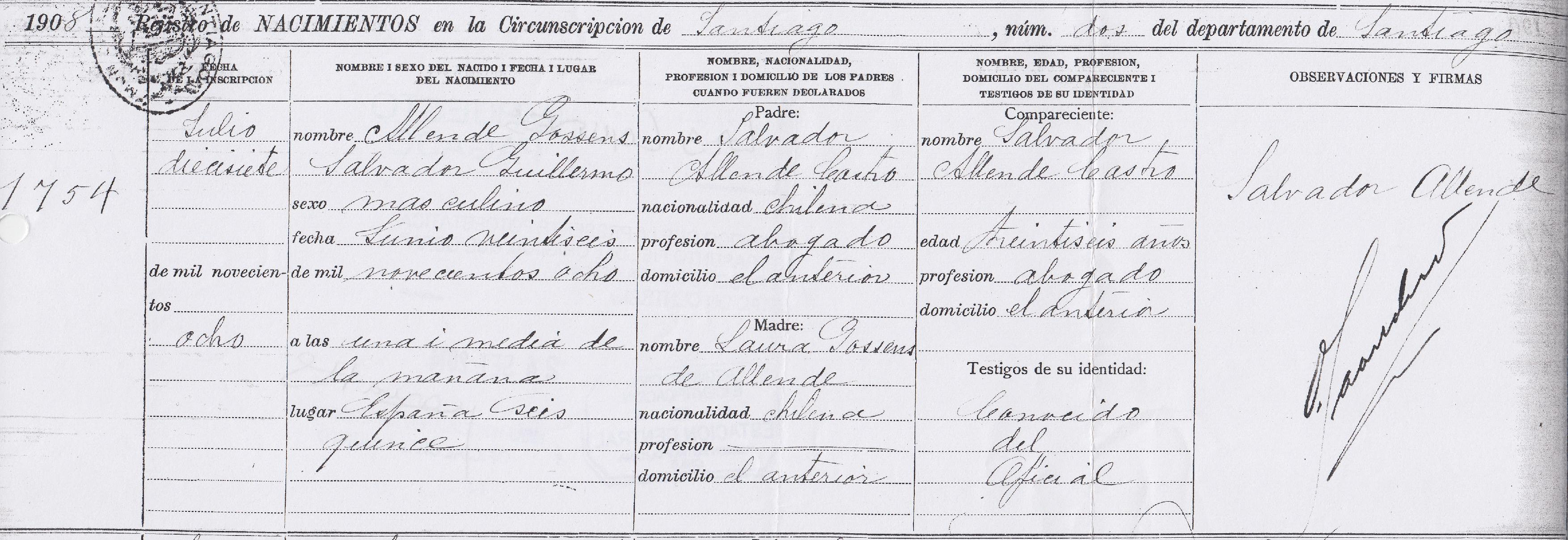
Salvador Allende's birth certificate.

Allende was born on 26 June 1908 in Santiago. He was the son of Salvador Allende Castro and Laura Gossens Uribe. Allende's family belonged to the Chilean upper middle class and had a long tradition of political involvement in progressive and liberal causes. His grandfather was a prominent physician and a social reformist who founded one of the first secular schools in Chile. Salvador Allende was of Basque and Belgian descent. In 1909, he moved with his family to the city of Tacna (then under Chilean administration) until he returned to his country to live in Iquique in 1916. In 1918, he studied at the National Institute of Santiago, and from 1919 to 1921, he studied at the Liceo de Valdivia. In 1922, he entered the Eduardo de la Barra school at the age of 16, studying there until 1924.

As a teenager, his main intellectual and political influence came from the shoe-maker Juan De Marchi, an Italian-born anarchist. In 1925, he attended the military service in the Cuirassier Regiment of Tacna. Allende was a talented athlete in his youth, being a member of the Everton de Viña del Mar sports club (named after the more famous English football club of the same name). In 1926, at the age of 18, he studied medicine at the University of Chile in Santiago and was elected President of the Student Center in 1927. In 1928, he entered the Grand Lodge of Chile and was elected vice president of the Federation of Students of the University of Chile in 1929. In 1930, he became the representative of the students of the School of Medicine.

During his time at medical school, Allende was influenced by Professor Max Westenhofer, a German pathologist who emphasized the social determinants of disease and social medicine. In 1931, he was expelled from the university and relegated to the north. That same year, he retook his sixth year of medical school and graduated at age 23. In 1932, he began practicing as a physician and anatomo-pathologist in the morgue of the Van Buren Hospital. He became the union leader of the Valparaíso doctors, becoming 1st Regional Secretary in Valparaíso. In 1935, at age 27, he was relegated to the city of Caldera for the second time and, in 1936, he founded the Popular Front in Valparaíso. In 1937, he was elected Deputy of Valparaíso and Aconcagua and, in 1938, he served as Undersecretary General of the Socialist Party of Chile.

In 1933, Allende co-founded with Marmaduque Grove and others a section of the Socialist Party of Chile in Valparaíso and became its chairman. He married Hortensia Bussi with whom he had three daughters. He was a Freemason, a member of the Lodge Progreso No. 4 in Valparaíso. In 1933, he published his doctoral thesis Higiene Mental y Delincuencia (Crime and Mental Hygiene) in which he criticized Cesare Lombroso's proposals.

== Political involvement up to 1970 ==
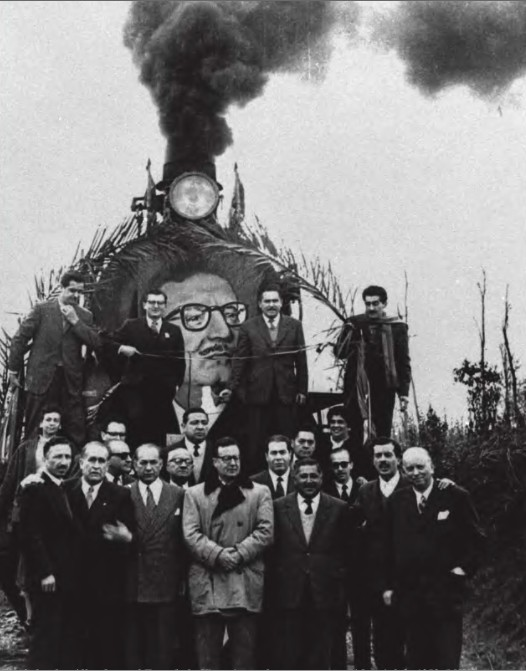
1958 presidential campaign with a train with Allende's face called the "Victory Train"

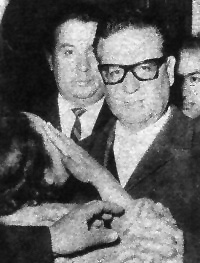
Salvador Allende in 1964

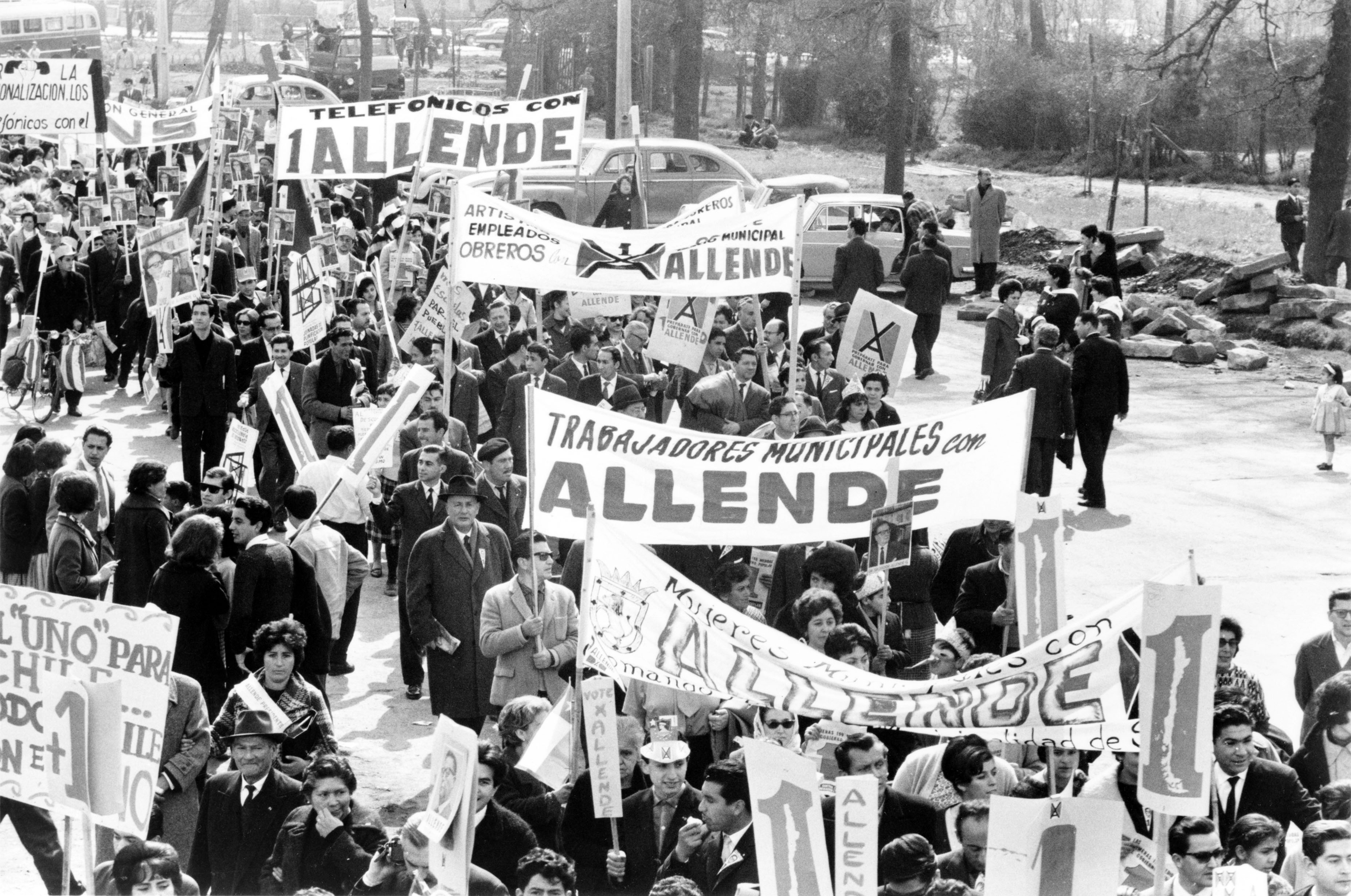
Chilean workers marching in support of Allende in 1964

In 1938, Allende was in charge of the electoral campaign of the Popular Front headed by Pedro Aguirre Cerda. The Popular Front's slogan was "Bread, a Roof and Work!" After its electoral victory, he became Minister of Health in the Reformist Popular Front government which was dominated by the Radicals. While serving in that position, Allende was responsible for the passage of a wide range of progressive social reforms, including safety laws protecting workers in the factories, higher pensions for widows, maternity care, and free lunch programs for schoolchildren.

Upon entering the government, Allende relinquished his congressional seat for Valparaíso, which he had won in 1937. Around that time, he wrote La Realidad Médico Social de Chile (The Social and Medical Reality of Chile). After Kristallnacht in Nazi Germany, Allende was one of 76 members of the Congress who sent a telegram to Adolf Hitler denouncing the persecution of Jews. Following President Aguirre Cerda's death in 1941, he was again elected deputy while the Popular Front was renamed Democratic Alliance.

In 1945, Allende became senator for the Valdivia, Llanquihue, Chiloé, Aisén, and Magallanes provinces; then for Tarapacá and Antofagasta in 1953; for Aconcagua and Valparaíso in 1961; and once more for Chiloé, Aisén, and Magallanes in 1969. He became president of the Chilean Senate in 1966. During the 1950s, Allende introduced legislation that established the Chilean national health service, the first program in the Americas to guarantee universal health care.

His three unsuccessful bids for the presidency (in the 1952, 1958, and 1964 elections) prompted Allende to joke that his epitaph would be "Here lies the next president of Chile." In 1952, as candidate for the Frente de Acción Popular (Popular Action Front, FRAP), he obtained only 5.4% of the votes, partly due to a division within socialist ranks over support for Carlos Ibáñez. In 1958, again as the FRAP candidate, Allende obtained 28.5% of the vote. This time, his defeat was attributed to votes lost to the populist Antonio Zamorano. This explanation has been questioned by modern research that suggest Zamorano's votes came from across the political spectrum.

== Electoral system ==
Declassified documents show that from 1962 through 1964, the CIA spent a total of $2.6 million to finance the campaign of Eduardo Frei and $3 million in anti-Allende propaganda "to scare voters away from Allende's FRAP coalition". The CIA considered its role in the victory of Frei a great success.

They argued that "the financial and organizational assistance given to Frei, the effort to keep Durán in the race, the propaganda campaign to denigrate Allende – were 'indispensable ingredients of Frei's success'", and they thought that his chances of winning and the good progress of his campaign would have been doubtful without the covert support of the government of the United States. Thus, in 1964 Allende lost once more as the FRAP candidate, polling 38.6% of the votes against 55.6% for Christian Democrat Eduardo Frei. As it became clear that the election would be a race between Allende and Frei, the political right – which initially had backed Radical Julio Durán– settled for Frei as "the lesser evil".

== 1970 election ==
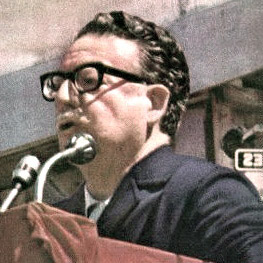
Allende as presidential candidate in 1970

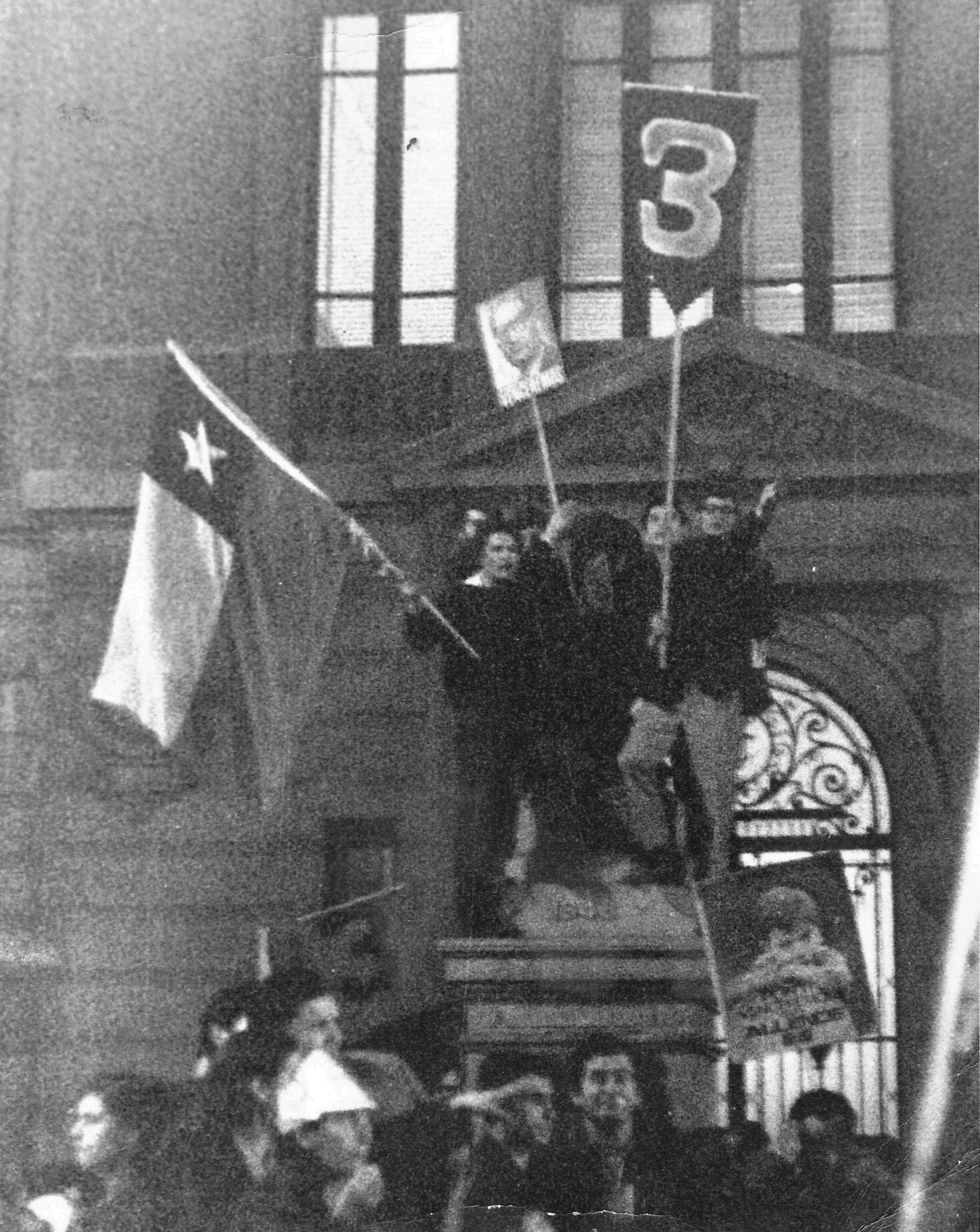
Photo taken on 4 September 1970 at 00:57 by Paul Lowry

Allende was considered part of the moderate wing of the socialists, with support from the communists who favored taking power via parliamentary democracy; in contrast, the left wing of the socialists (led by Carlos Altamirano) and several other far-left parties called for violent insurrection. Some argue, however, that this was reversed at the end of his period in office. (Note: The Communist Party belonged to the moderate wing of the Unidad Popular coalition, while Allende's Socialist Party was split between two factions; the moderate vía pacífica and the radical vía insurreccional.)

Allende won the 1970 Chilean presidential election as leader of the Unidad Popular ("Popular Unity") coalition. On 4 September 1970, he obtained a narrow plurality of 36.6% to 35.3% over Jorge Alessandri, a former president, with 27.8% going to a third candidate, Radomiro Tomic of the Christian Democratic Party (PDC). According to the Chilean constitution of the time, if no presidential candidate obtained a majority of the popular vote, Congress would choose one of the two candidates with the highest number of votes as the winner. Tradition was for Congress to vote for the candidate with the highest popular vote, regardless of margin. Former president Jorge Alessandri had been elected in 1958 with a plurality of 31.6% over Allende's 28.85%.

One month after the election, on 20 October, while the Senate had still to reach a decision and negotiations were actively in place between the Christian Democrats and the Popular Unity, General René Schneider, Commander in Chief of the Chilean Army, was shot resisting a kidnap attempt by a group led by General Roberto Viaux. Hospitalized, he died of his wounds three days later on 23 October. Schneider was a defender of the "constitutionalist" doctrine that the army's role is exclusively professional, its mission being to protect the country's sovereignty and not to interfere in politics.

General Schneider's death was widely disapproved of and, for the time, ended military opposition to Allende, whom the Congress finally chose on 24 October. On 26 October, President Eduardo Frei named General Carlos Prats as commander in chief of the army to replace René Schneider. Allende assumed the presidency on 3 November 1970 after signing a Statute of Constitutional Guarantees proposed by the Christian Democrats in return for their support in Congress. In an extensive interview with Régis Debray in 1972, Allende explained his reasons for agreeing to the guarantees. Some critics have interpreted Allende's responses as an admission that signing the Statute was only a tactical move.

== Presidency ==
=== "The Chilean Path to Socialism" ===
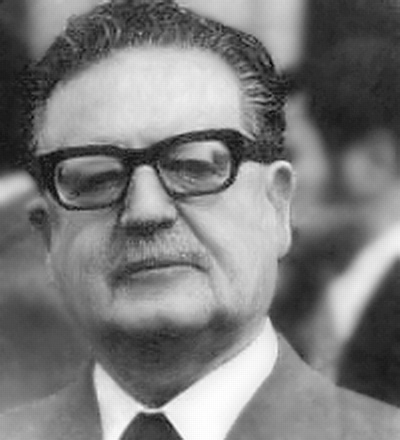
Allende in 1970

In his speech to the Chilean legislature following his election, Allende made clear his intention to move Chile from a capitalist to a socialist society:

We are moving towards socialism, not from an academic love for a doctrinaire system, but encouraged by the strength of our people, who know that it is an inescapable demand if we are to overcome backwardness and who feel that a socialist regime is the only way available to modern nations who want to build rationally in freedom, independence and dignity. We are moving towards socialism because the people, through their vote, have freely rejected capitalism as a system which has resulted in a crudely unequal society, a society deformed by social injustice and degraded by the deterioration of the very foundations of human solidarity.

Upon assuming the presidency, Allende began to carry out his platform of implementing a socialist program called La vía chilena al socialismo ("the Chilean path to socialism"). That included nationalization of large-scale industries (notably copper mining and banking), government administration of the healthcare system and of the educational system (with the help of a United States educator, Jane A. Hobson-Gonzalez from Kokomo, Indiana), a free-milk program for schoolchildren and in shanty towns of Chile, and an expansion of the land seizure and redistribution already begun under his predecessor President Eduardo Frei Montalva, who had nationalized between one-fifth and one-quarter of all the properties liable for takeover. Allende also intended to improve the socio-economic welfare of Chile's poorest citizens; a key element was to provide employment, either in the new nationalized enterprises or on public-work projects.

=== Agrarian and literacy reforms and Indigenous policy ===
The Allende government worked to transform Chilean popular culture through formal changes to school curriculum and through broader cultural education initiatives, such as state-sponsored music festivals and tours of Chilean folklorists and nueva canción musicians.

Allende began returning land that was stolen from Chile's indigenous population, specifically the Mapuche, arguing that a consequence of land inequality among the indigenous population led to '600,000 Mapuche and Chilean peasant children [being] mentally retarded because they had lacked protein in their formative years.' Allende instituted a program of establishing family farms among the Mapuche, creating farming cooperatives, radio stations and medical clinics.

=== Economic policy ===
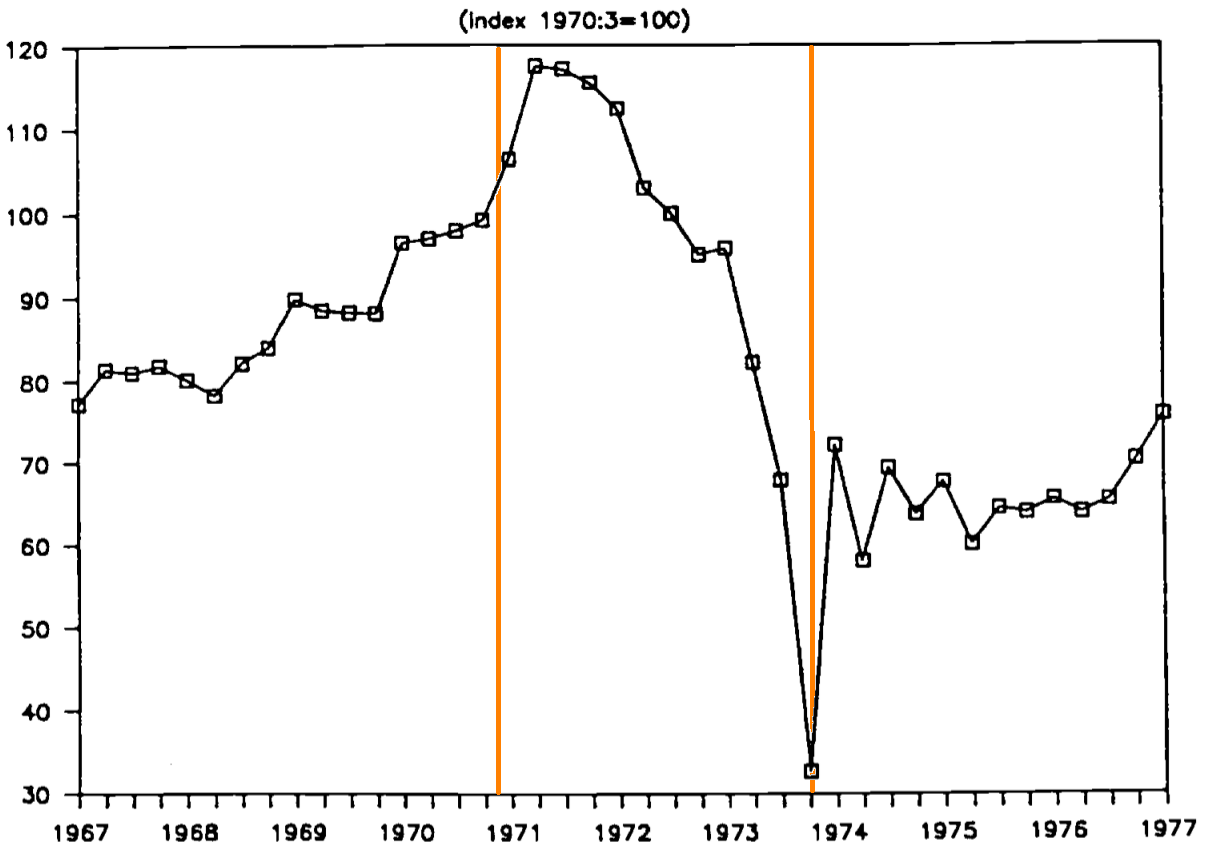
Chile real wages between 1967 and 1977. Orange lines mark the beginning and end of Allende's presidency.

Chilean presidents were allowed a maximum term of six years, which may explain Allende's haste to restructure the economy. Not only was a major restructuring program organized (the Vuskovic plan), he also had to make it a success if a left-wing successor to Allende was going to be elected. In the first year of Allende's term, the short-term economic results of the economy minister Pedro Vuskovic's expansive monetary policy were highly favorable: 12% industrial growth and an 8.6% increase in GDP, accompanied by major declines in inflation (down from 34.9% to 22.1%) and unemployment (down to 3.8%). By 1972, the Chilean escudo had an inflation rate of 140%. The average real GDP contracted between 1971 and 1973 at an annual rate of a 5.6% negative growth, and the government's fiscal deficit soared while foreign reserves declined. Unemployment rates had dropped from 6.3% in 1970 to 3.5% in 1972 before dropping again in 1973 to the lowest ever recorded.

The combination of inflation and price controls, together with the disappearance of basic commodities from supermarket shelves, led to the rise of black markets in rice, beans, sugar, and flour. The Chilean economic situation was also somewhat exacerbated due to a US-backed campaign to fund worker strikes in certain sectors of the economy. The Allende government announced it would default on debts owed to international creditors and foreign governments. Allende also froze all prices while raising salaries. His implementation of the policies was strongly opposed by landowners, employers, businessmen and transporters associations, and some civil servants and professional unions. The rightist opposition was led by the National Party, the Catholic Church (which in 1973 was displeased with the direction of educational policy), and eventually the Christian Democrats. There were growing tensions with foreign multinational corporations and the government of the United States.

Allende undertook the pioneering Project Cybersyn, a distributed decision support system for decentralized economic planning, developed by British cybernetics expert Stafford Beer. Based on the experimental viable system model and the neural network approach to organizational design, the Project consisted of four modules: a network of telex machines (Cybernet) in all state-run enterprises that would transmit and receive information with the government in Santiago. Information from the field would be fed into statistical modeling software (Cyberstride) that would show production indicators, such as raw material supplies or high rates of worker absenteeism, in "almost" real time alerting the workers. If those performance parameters fell outside acceptable ranges by a very large degree, the central government would also be informed. The information would also be input into an economic simulation software (CHECO, for CHilean ECOnomic simulator) which featured a Bayesian filtering and control setting that the government could use to forecast the possible outcome of economic decisions. Finally, a sophisticated operations room (Opsroom) would provide a space where managers could see relevant economic data, formulate feasible responses to emergencies, and transmit advice and directives to enterprises and factories in alarm situations by using the telex network. In conjunction with the system, the Cybersyn development team also planned the Cyberfolk device system, a closed television circuit connected to an interactive apparatus that would enable the citizenry to actively participate in economic and political decision-making.

Allende raised wages on a number of occasions throughout 1970 and 1971, but the wage hikes were negated by ongoing inflation of Chile's fiat currency. Although price rises had been high even under Frei (27% a year between 1967 and 1970), a basic basket of consumer goods rose by 120% from 190 to 421 escudos in one month alone, August 1972. From 1970 to 1972, while Allende was in government, exports fell 24% and imports rose 26%, with imports of food rising an estimated 149%. Export income fell due to a hard-hit copper industry; the price of copper on international markets fell by almost a third, and post-nationalization copper production fell as well. Copper is Chile's single most important export, as more than half of Chile's export receipts were from that sole commodity. The price of copper fell from a peak of $66 per ton in 1970 to only $48–49 in 1971 and 1972. Chile was already dependent on food imports, and the decline in export earnings coincided with declines in domestic food production following Allende's agrarian reforms.

The rate of inflation fell from 36.1% in 1970 to 22.1% in 1971, while average real wages rose by 22.3% during 1971. (Note: Quote from p. 195 – "Looking at the traditional macroeconomic variables, the first year of the UP Government achieved relatively spectacular results for the Chilean economy (see tables 7.7 and 7.8)".) Additionally, Allende government had reduced inflation to 14% in the first nine months of 1971.

=== Foreign policy ===
In 1971, Chile re-established diplomatic relations with Cuba, joining Mexico and Canada in rejecting a previously established Organization of American States convention prohibiting governments in the Western Hemisphere from establishing diplomatic relations with Cuba. Shortly afterward, Cuban president Fidel Castro made a month-long visit to Chile. Originally, the visit was supposed to be one week; however, Castro enjoyed Chile and one week led to another. Despite his attitude of "socialist solidarity", Castro was reportedly critical of Allende's policies. Castro was quoted as saying that "Marxism is a revolution of production", whereas "Allende's was a revolution of consumption."

==== Foreign relations ====
Allende took office in a difficult international context. Chile was aligned with the United States in 1970. Elsewhere in Latin America, Brazil, Argentina and Bolivia were ruled by conservative military dictatorships (soon to be joined by Uruguay). Colombia had a liberal government and Venezuela, a democratic Christian one, both elected by the people. Many in Cuba, Peru and Mexico viewed the Chilean socialist experiment with sympathy. Under Allende's presidency, Chile joined the Non-Aligned Movement.

Chile, which until then had been fussy about ideological boundaries, diversified its diplomatic and trade relations, regardless of the internal political regime of each country. The government established diplomatic relations with Cuba, Guyana, seven African countries (Congo, Equatorial Guinea, Libya, Madagascar, Nigeria, Tanzania, and Zaire), three European countries (Albania, East Germany and Hungary) and seven Asian countries (Afghanistan, Bangladesh, Cambodia, North Korea, China, Mongolia, South Vietnam and North Vietnam).

It tried to promote Latin American integration. At the 1971 Latin American Economic and Social Council, the Chilean representative Gonzalo Martner García formulated four major proposals, summarized by the historian Jorge Magasich: "1) to ask the United States for a moratorium on external debt for a decade in order to allocate these sums to development policies; 2) to create a Latin American central bank to "invest Latin America's reserves, 70% of which are in the United States", to receive "the region's deposits and assets" and to coordinate the operations of the central banks in order to protect the region from financial turbulence; 3) Promote the creation of a global technology fund for development, fed by compulsory contributions of licenses, industrial processes and other funds for research, so as to limit the abuses associated with technological property; 4) Create a Latin American organisation for the development of science and technology appropriate to the region."

He began negotiations with Bolivia over the historical dispute between the two countries (Bolivia had lost access to the sea since the War of the Pacific between 1879 and 1884) and welcomed Bolivia's maritime request. Nevertheless, relations became tense again following a coup d'état by Bolivian General Hugo Banzer in August 1971. At the same time, Chile granted asylum to thousands of political exiles from Latin American countries.

Salvador Allende openly rejected the influence of the Organization of American States (OAS), a body close to the United States government, and the General Agreement on Tariffs and Trade (GATT), which favored the interests of more developed countries. On the other hand, he was a fervent defender of the United Nations Conference on Trade and Development (UNCTAD), which he considered to be more representative since it allowed economic and trade issues to be negotiated on an equal legal footing. In a speech to UNCTAD, he also warned of the policy of the United States, Japan and the European Economic Community to progressively eliminate obstacles to free trade. He said that "freeing up trade ... erases at a stroke the benefits that the Generalised System of Preferences brings to developing countries".

Allende's Popular Unity government tried to maintain normal relations with the United States. When Chile nationalized its copper industry, the United States government cut off support and increased its support to the opposition. Forced to seek alternative sources of trade and finance, Chile gained commitments from the Soviet Union to invest some $400 million in Chile in the next six years. The United States Department of State put it at $115 million from Eastern Europe and $65 million from China, while Soviet and Chilean Popular Unity sources put it at total of $620 million from socialist countries. Much of the credit was never utilized, and the Soviets were not willing to subsidize Chile the same way they did for Cuba.

Allende's government was disappointed that it received far less economic assistance from the Soviets than it hoped for. Trade between the two countries did not significantly increase and the credits were mainly linked to the purchase of Soviet equipment. Moreover, credits from the Soviet Union were much less than those provided to the People's Republic of China and countries of the Eastern Bloc. When Allende visited the Soviet Union in late 1972 in search of more aid and additional lines of credit after three years, he was turned down.

===== United States involvement =====
The United States opposition to Allende started several years before he was elected President of Chile. Declassified documents show that from 1962 to 1964, the CIA spent $3 million on anti-Allende propaganda "to scare voters away from Allende's FRAP coalition" and spent a total of $2.6 million to finance the presidential campaign of Eduardo Frei.

The possibility of Allende winning Chile's 1970 election was deemed a disaster by the Nixon administration that wanted to protect American geopolitical interests by preventing the spread of Communism during the Cold War. In September 1970, then United States president Richard Nixon informed the CIA that an Allende government in Chile would not be acceptable and authorized $10 million to stop Allende from coming to power or unseat him. A CIA document declared, "It is firm and continuing policy that Allende be overthrown by a coup." Henry Kissinger's 40 Committee and the CIA planned to impede Allende's investiture as President of Chile with covert efforts known as "Track I" and "Track II"; Track I sought to prevent Allende from assuming power via so-called "parliamentary trickery", while under the Track II initiative, the CIA tried to convince key Chilean military officers to carry out a coup.

Some point to the involvement of the Defense Intelligence Agency agents that allegedly secured the missiles used to bombard La Moneda Palace. In fact, open US military aid to Chile continued during the Allende administration, and the national government was very much aware of that although there is no record that Allende himself believed that such assistance was anything but beneficial to Chile. During Richard Nixon's presidency, United States officials attempted to prevent Allende's election by financing political parties aligned with opposition candidate Jorge Alessandri and supporting strikes in the mining and transportation sectors. After the 1970 election, the Track I operation attempted to incite Chile's outgoing president, Eduardo Frei Montalva, to persuade his party (PDC) to vote in Congress for Alessandri.

Under the plan, Alessandri would resign his office immediately after assuming it and call new elections. Eduardo Frei would then be constitutionally able to run again (since the Chilean Constitution did not allow a president to hold two consecutive terms, but allowed multiple non-consecutive ones), and presumably easily defeat Allende. The Chilean Congress instead chose Allende as president, on the condition that he would sign a "Statute of Constitutional Guarantees" affirming that he would respect and obey the Chilean Constitution and that his reforms would not undermine any of its elements. Track II was aborted, as parallel initiatives already underway within the Chilean military rendered it moot. During the second term of office of Democratic President Bill Clinton, the CIA acknowledged having played a role in Chilean politics before the coup, but its degree of involvement is debated. The CIA was notified by its Chilean contacts of the impending coup two days in advance but contends it "played no direct role in" the coup.

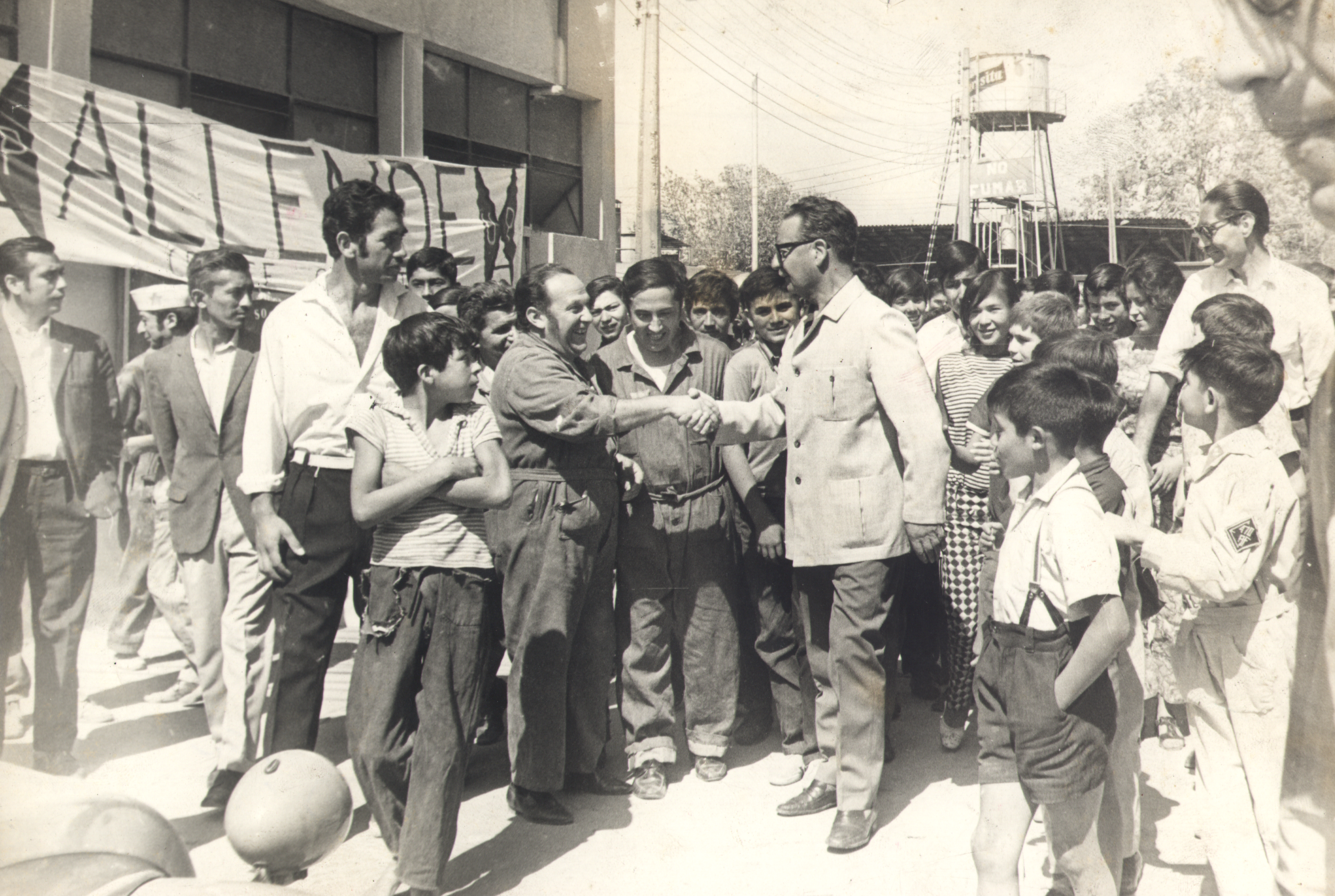
Allende in 1972

Much of the internal opposition to Allende's policies came from the business sector, and recently released United States government documents confirm that the United States indirectly funded the truck drivers' strike, which exacerbated the already chaotic economic situation before the coup. The most prominent United States corporations in Chile before Allende's presidency were the Anaconda and Kennecott copper companies and ITT Corporation, International Telephone and Telegraph. Both copper corporations aimed to expand privatized copper production in the city of Sewell in the Chilean Andes, where the world's largest underground copper mine "El Teniente", was located.

At the end of 1968, according to United States Department of Commerce data, United States corporate holdings in Chile amounted to $964 million. Anaconda and Kennecott accounted for 28% of United States holdings, but ITT had by far the largest holding of any single corporation, with an investment of $200 million in Chile. In 1970, before Allende was elected, ITT owned 70% of Chitelco, the Chilean Telephone Company and funded El Mercurio, a Chilean right-wing newspaper. Documents released in 2000 by the CIA confirmed that before the elections of 1970, ITT gave $700,000 to Allende's conservative opponent, Jorge Alessandri, with help from the CIA on how to channel the money safely. ITT president Harold Geneen also offered $1 million to the CIA to help defeat Allende in the elections.

After General Augusto Pinochet assumed power, United States Secretary of State Henry Kissinger told President Nixon that the United States "didn't do it" (referring to the coup) but "we helped them... created the conditions as great as possible". Documents declassified under the Clinton administration's Chile Declassification Project show that the United States government and the CIA sought to overthrow Allende in 1970 immediately before he took office ("Project FUBELT"). Many documents regarding the United States intervention in Chile remain classified. Those that have been declassified showed that Nixon, Kissinger, and the United States government were aware of the coup and the plans to overthrow Allende's democratically elected government.

===== Relations with the Soviet Union =====
Political and moral support came mostly through the Communist Party and unions of the Soviet Union. For instance, Allende received the Lenin Peace Prize from the Soviet Union in 1972. At the same time, there were some fundamental differences between Allende and Soviet political analysts, who believed that some violence or measures that those analysts "theoretically considered to be just", should have been used. Declarations from KGB General Nikolai Leonov, former Deputy Chief of the First Chief Directorate of the KGB, confirmed that the Soviet Union supported Allende's government economically, politically and militarily. Leonov stated in an interview at the Chilean Center of Public Studies (CEP) that the Soviet economic support included over $100 million in credit, three fishing ships (that distributed 17,000 tons of frozen fish to the population), factories (as help after the 1971 earthquake), 3,100 tractors, 74,000 tons of wheat and more than a million tins of condensed milk. In mid-1973, the Soviets approved the delivery of weapons (artillery and tanks) to the Chilean Army. When news of an attempt from the Army to depose Allende through a coup d'état reached Soviet officials, the shipment was redirected to another country.

Allende is mentioned in a book written by the official historian of the British Intelligence MI5, Christopher Andrew. According to SIS and Andrew, the book is based on the handwritten notes of KGB archivist defector Vasili Mitrokhin. Andrew alleged that the KGB said that Allende "was made to understand the necessity of reorganizing Chile's army and intelligence services, and of setting up a relationship between Chile's and the USSR's intelligence services." The Soviets observed closely whether the alternative form of socialism could work, and they did not interfere with the Chileans' decisions. Nikolai Leonov affirmed that whenever he tried to give advice to Latin American leaders, he was usually turned down by them, and he was told that they had their own understanding on how to conduct political business in their countries. Leonov added that the relationships of KGB agents with Latin American leaders did not involve intelligence because their intelligence target was the United States. Since many North Americans were living in the region, the Soviets were focusing in recruiting agents from the United States. Latin America was also a better region for KGB agents to get in touch with their informants from the CIA or other contacts from the United States than inside that country.

According to Vasili Mitrokhin, the Soviet Union provided financial support for the election of Salvador Allende, with whom it had had ties since the 1950s, by granting him a "personal subsidy of $500,000," which was approved by the Politburo with the aim of "strengthening confidential relations." It is also reported that $18,000 was paid to a left-wing senator to "persuade him not to run as a candidate." Once elected, the USSR provided $30,000 in October 1971 to "consolidate relations of trust" with the Allende government and another $50,000 requested in February 1973, shortly before the 1973 Chilean parliamentary election. The documents also claim that the Soviet intelligence service sought closer cooperation between Chilean intelligence agencies and the Soviet Union, including a possible reorganization of the Chilean Army and intelligence services, proposals to which Allende allegedly reacted positively. The KGB reportedly viewed the Popular Unity government's situation as increasingly difficult by 1972 and criticized Allende for not using "force" against his opponents. After the 1973 Chilean coup d'état, Soviet intelligence officials reportedly complained that Allende had given little importance to their warnings about the possibility of his overthrow.

=== Socioeconomic and political tensions ===
In October 1972, the first of what were to be a wave of strikes was led first by truckers, and later by small businessmen, some (mostly professional) unions and some student groups. Other than the inevitable damage to the economy, the chief effect of the 24-day strike was to induce Allende to bring the head of the army, general Carlos Prats, into the government as Interior Minister. Allende also instructed the government to commandeer trucks to keep the nation from coming to a halt. Government supporters also helped to mobilize trucks and buses, but violence served as a deterrent to full mobilization, even with police protection for the strike-breakers. Allende's actions were eventually declared unlawful by the Chilean appeals court and the government was ordered to return trucks to their owners. Throughout his presidency, racial tensions between the poor descendants of indigenous people, who supported Allende's reforms, and the white elite increased.

Throughout his presidency, Allende remained at odds with the Chilean Congress, which was dominated by the Christian Democratic Party. In 1964, Eduardo Frei had promised a "Revolution in Liberty", a middle-class revolution that was funded by the United States government's Alliance for Progress. Frei carried out a series of progressive reforms, including land reform, an issue that had not been touched since Chile's independence in the early 19th century. According to historian Marian Schlotterbeck, this was "[John F.] Kennedy's vision – stave off the threat of communist revolution by improving standards of living across the continent". The Christian Democrats had campaigned on a socialist platform in the 1970 elections but drifted away from those positions during Allende's presidency, and accused Allende of leading Chile toward a Cuban-style dictatorship and sought to overturn many of his more radical policies. They eventually formed a coalition with the National Party.

Allende and his opponents in Congress repeatedly accused each other of undermining the Chilean Constitution and acting undemocratically. Allende's increasingly bold socialist policies (partly in response to pressure from some of the more radical members within his coalition), combined with his close contacts with Cuba, heightened fears in Washington. The Nixon administration continued exerting economic pressure on Chile via multilateral organizations and continued to back Allende's opponents in the Chilean Congress. Almost immediately after his election, Nixon directed CIA and US State Department officials to "put pressure" on the Allende government. His economic policies were used by economists Rudi Dornbusch and Sebastián Edwards to coin the term macroeconomic populism. In 1972, Chile's inflation stood at 150%.

== Crisis ==
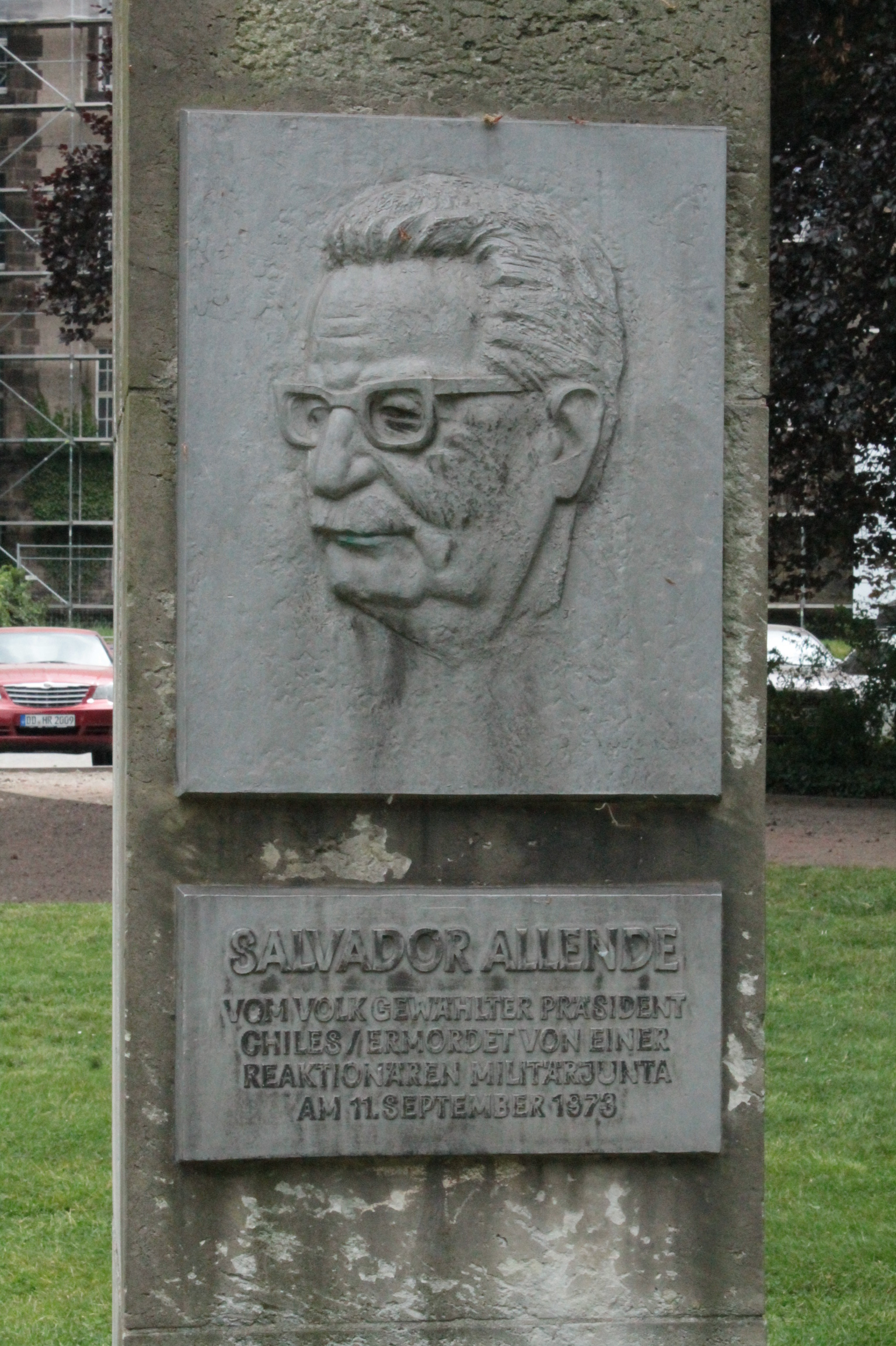
Monument to Salvador Allende, Munchner Platz, Dresden

On 29 June 1973, Colonel Roberto Souper surrounded the presidential palace, La Moneda, with his tank regiment but failed to depose the government. That failed coup d'état – known as the Tanquetazo ("tank putsch") – organised by the nationalist Patria y Libertad paramilitary group, was followed by a general strike at the end of July that included the copper miners of El Teniente.

In August 1973, a constitutional crisis occurred, and the Supreme Court of Chile publicly complained about the inability of the Allende government to enforce the law of the land. On 22 August, the Chamber of Deputies (with the Christian Democrats uniting with the National Party) accused the government of unconstitutional acts through Allende's refusal to promulgate constitutional amendments, already approved by the Chamber, which would have prevented his government from continuing his massive nationalization plan and called upon the military to enforce constitutional order.

For months, Allende had feared calling upon the Carabineros ("Carabineers", the national police force), suspecting them of disloyalty to his government. On 9 August, President Allende appointed General Carlos Prats as Minister of Defence. On 24 August 1973, General Prats was forced to resign both as defense minister and as the commander-in-chief of the army, embarrassed by both the Alejandrina Cox incident and a public protest in front of his house by the wives of his generals. General Augusto Pinochet replaced him as Army commander-in-chief the same day.

=== Resolution by the Chamber of Deputies ===
On 22 August 1973, the Christian Democrats and the National Party members of the Chamber of Deputies joined to vote 81 to 47 in favor of a resolution that accused the government of disregard the separation of powers and arrogating legislative and judicial prerogatives to the executive branch of government, among other alleged constitutional violations. The resolution asked the authorities to "put an immediate end" to "breach[es of] the Constitution ... with the goal of redirecting government activity toward the path of law and ensuring the Constitutional order of our Nation, and the essential underpinnings of democratic co-existence among Chileans." The resolution declared that Allende's government sought "to conquer absolute power with the obvious purpose of subjecting all citizens to the strictest political and economic control by the state ... [with] the goal of establishing ... a totalitarian system" and claimed that the government had made "violations of the Constitution ... a permanent system of conduct".

Specifically, the government of Allende was accused of ruling by decree and thwarting the normal legislative system; refusing to enforce judicial decisions against its partisans; not carrying out sentences and judicial resolutions that contravened its objectives; ignoring the decrees of the independent General Comptroller's Office; sundry media offenses, including usurping control of the National Television Network and applying economic pressure against those media organizations that were not unconditional supporters of the government; allowing its supporters to assemble with arms, and preventing the same by its right-wing opponents; supporting more than 1,500 illegal takeovers of farms; illegal repression of the El Teniente miners' strike; and illegally limiting emigration. Finally, the resolution condemned the creation and development of government-protected socialist armed groups, which were said to be "headed towards a confrontation with the armed forces". President Allende's efforts to re-organize the military and the police forces were characterized as "notorious attempts to use the armed and police forces for partisan ends, destroy their institutional hierarchy, and politically infiltrate their ranks".

=== Allende's response ===
The resolution was later used by Pinochet as a way to justify the coup, which occurred two weeks later. On 24 August 1973, two days after the resolution, Allende responded. He accused the opposition of trying to incite a military coup by encouraging the armed forces to disobey civilian authorities. He described the Congress's declaration as "destined to damage the country's prestige abroad and create internal confusion", and predicted: "It will facilitate the seditious intention of certain sectors." He observed that the declaration (passed 81–47 in the Chamber of Deputies) had not obtained the two-thirds Senate majority "constitutionally required" to convict the president of abuse of power, thus the Congress was "invoking the intervention of the armed forces and of Order against a democratically-elected government" and "subordinat[ing] political representation of national sovereignty to the armed institutions, which neither can nor ought to assume either political functions or the representation of the popular will."

Allende argued that he had obeyed constitutional means for including military men to the cabinet at the service of civic peace and national security, defending republican institutions against insurrection and terrorism. In contrast, he said that Congress was promoting a coup d’état or a civil war with a declaration full of affirmations that had already been refuted beforehand and which in substance and process (directly handing it to the ministers rather than directly handing it to the president) violated a dozen articles of the then-current constitution. He further argued that the legislature was usurping the government's executive function.

Allende wrote: "Chilean democracy is a conquest by all of the people. It is neither the work nor the gift of the exploiting classes, and it will be defended by those who, with sacrifices accumulated over generations, have imposed it ... With a tranquil conscience ... I sustain that never before has Chile had a more democratic government than that over which I have the honor to preside ... I solemnly reiterate my decision to develop democracy and a state of law to their ultimate consequences...Congress has made itself a bastion against the transformations ... and has done everything it can to perturb the functioning of the finances and of the institutions, sterilizing all creative initiatives." Adding that economic and political means would be needed to relieve the country's current crisis, and that the Congress was obstructing said means; having already paralyzed the state, they sought to destroy it. He concluded by calling upon the workers and all democrats and patriots to join him in defending the Chilean constitution and the revolutionary process.

== Coup ==
In early September 1973, Allende floated the idea of resolving the constitutional crisis with a plebiscite. (Note: Allende's personal adviser, Juan Garcés, escaped the siege on the Moneda Palace and fled to Europe, where he published testimonies about the last days of the administration: "On 10 September, Allende had assembled his ministers in an extraordinary council to finalize the call announcing the plebiscite.") His speech outlining such a solution was scheduled for Tuesday, 11 September but he was never able to deliver it. On that same day, the Chilean military under Pinochet, aided by the United States and its CIA, staged a coup against Allende, who was at the head of the first democratically elected Marxist government in Latin America. Historian Peter Winn described the 1973 coup as one of the most violent events in Chilean history. It led to a series of human rights abuses in Chile under Pinochet, who initiated a brutal and long-lasting campaign of political suppression through torture, murder, and exile, which significantly weakened leftist opposition to the military dictatorship of Chile, which ruled the country until 1990. Due to the coup's occurrence on the same date as the 11 September attacks in the United States, it has sometimes been referred to as "the other 9/11".

=== Death ===
"Workers of my country, I have faith in Chile and its destiny. Other men will overcome this dark and bitter moment when treason seeks to prevail. Keep in mind that, much sooner than later, the great avenues will again be opened through which will pass free men to construct a better society. Long live Chile! Long live the people! Long live the workers!"
—President Allende's farewell speech, 11 September 1973.

Just before the capture of La Moneda (the Presidential Palace), with gunfire and explosions clearly audible in the background, Allende gave his farewell speech to Chileans on live radio, speaking of himself in the past tense, of his love for Chile and of his deep faith in its future. He stated that his commitment to Chile did not allow him to take an easy way out, and he would not be used as a propaganda tool by those he called "traitors" (he refused an offer of safe passage). Juan Seoane, Chief of President Allende's Bodyguard at the time of the events – and who was with Allende until moments before his death – declared in an interview reported by the University of Chile:

"Allende began to say goodbye to us one by one, he gave us a hug and told us ‘Thank you for everything, comrade, thank you for everything'", and then he said that he was going to leave last. He walked to the end of the line with his AK, turned around behind a wall, and then he shouted, 'Allende doesn't surrender…!'. The shot was heard fifteen meters from where we were". (Reports in El Tiempo and other Latin-American media confirmed Allende´s last words).

Shortly afterwards, the coup plotters announced that Allende had committed suicide. An official announcement declared that the weapon he had used was an automatic rifle. Before his death he had been photographed several times holding an AK-47, a gift from Fidel Castro. He was found dead with that gun, according to contemporaneous statements made by officials in the Pinochet regime. In an interview with David Frost, the daughter of Allende's first cousin, Isabel Allende, said that, at a family lunch nine days before his death, Allende had said that he would either stay till the end of this term of presidency or he would be taken out feet first. Lingering doubts regarding the manner of Allende's death persisted throughout the period of the Pinochet regime. Many Chileans and independent observers refused to accept on faith the government's version of events amid speculation that Allende had been murdered by government agents. Pinochet had long left power and died when in 2011 a Chilean court opened a criminal investigation into the circumstances of Allende's death.

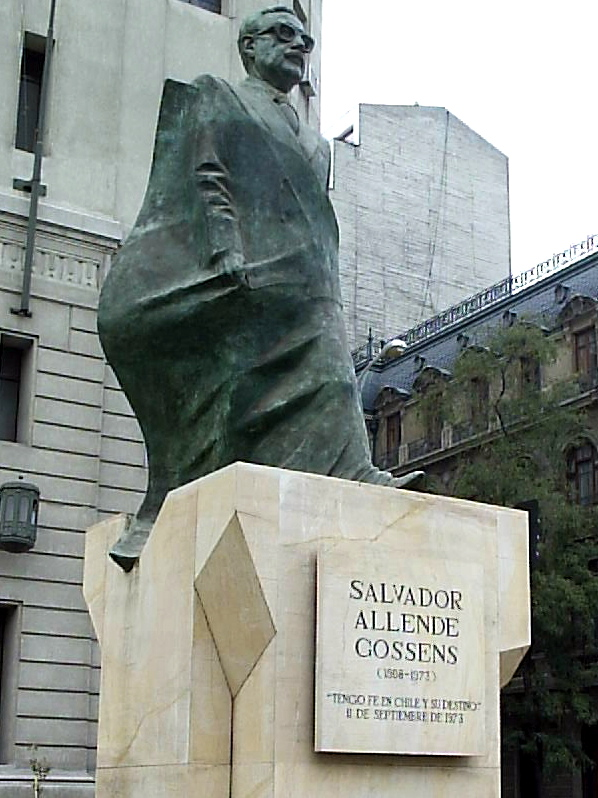
Statue of Allende in front of the Palacio de la Moneda. A portion of the statue's drapery, shown worn as a cape, is the national flag of Chile.

The ongoing criminal investigation led to a May 2011 court order that Allende's remains be exhumed and autopsied by an international team of experts. Results of the autopsy were officially released in mid-July 2011. The team of experts concluded that the former president had shot himself with an AK-47 assault rifle. In December 2011 the judge in charge of the investigation affirmed the experts' findings and ruled Allende's death a suicide. On 11 September 2012, the 39th anniversary of Allende's death, a Chilean appeals court unanimously upheld the trial court's ruling, officially closing the case. The Guardian reported that a scientific autopsy of the remains had confirmed that "Salvador Allende committed suicide during the 1973 coup that toppled his socialist government." It went on to say:

British ballistics expert David Prayer said Allende died of two shots fired from an assault rifle that was held between his legs and under his chin and was set to fire automatically. The bullets blew out the top of his head and killed him instantly. The forensics team's conclusion was unanimous. Spanish expert Francisco Etxeberria said: "We have absolutely no doubt" that Allende committed suicide.

Isabel Allende Bussi, the daughter of Allende and a member of the Senate of Chile told the BBC that: "The report conclusions are consistent with what we already believed. When faced with extreme circumstances, he made the decision of taking his own life, instead of being humiliated." The definitive and unanimous results produced by the 2011 Chilean judicial investigation appear to have laid to rest decades of nagging suspicions that Allende might have been assassinated by the Chilean Armed Forces. Public acceptance of the suicide theory had already been growing for much of the previous decade. In a post-junta Chile where restrictions on free speech were steadily eroding, independent and seemingly reliable witnesses began to tell their stories to the news media and to human rights researchers. The cumulative weight of the facts reported by those witnesses provided enough support for many previously unconfirmed details relating to Allende's death.

== Family ==
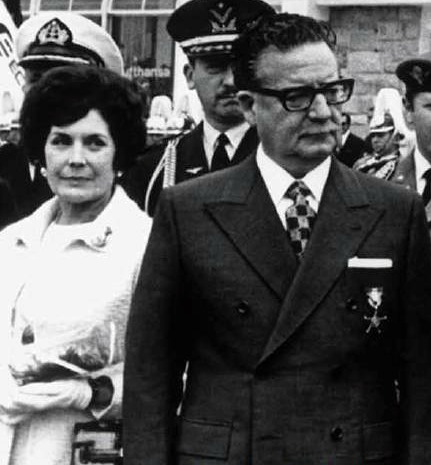
Allende with his wife Hortensia Bussi in 1971.

Well-known relatives of Salvador Allende include his daughter Isabel Allende Bussi (a politician) and his cousin Isabel Allende Llona (a writer).

== Memorials ==
On the 30th anniversary of his death, an Allende Museum opened in Chile, and an Allende foundation has since managed his estate.

=== South America ===
Memorials to Allende include a statue in front of the Palacio de la Moneda. The placement of the statue was controversial; it was placed facing the eastern edge of the Plaza de la Ciudadanía, a plaza which contains memorials to a number of Chilean statesmen. However, the statue is not located in the plaza, but rather on a surrounding sidewalk facing an entrance to the plaza. His tomb is a major tourist attraction. Allende is buried in the general cemetery of Santiago.

There is a square in São Paulo, Brazil, named after Allende. Also in Brazil, Rio de Janeiro has a BRT station named after him. In Nicaragua, the tourist port of Managua is named after him. The Salvador Allende Port is located near downtown Managua. The broken glasses of Allende were given to the Chilean National History Museum in 1996 by a woman who had found them in La Moneda in 1973.

=== Europe ===
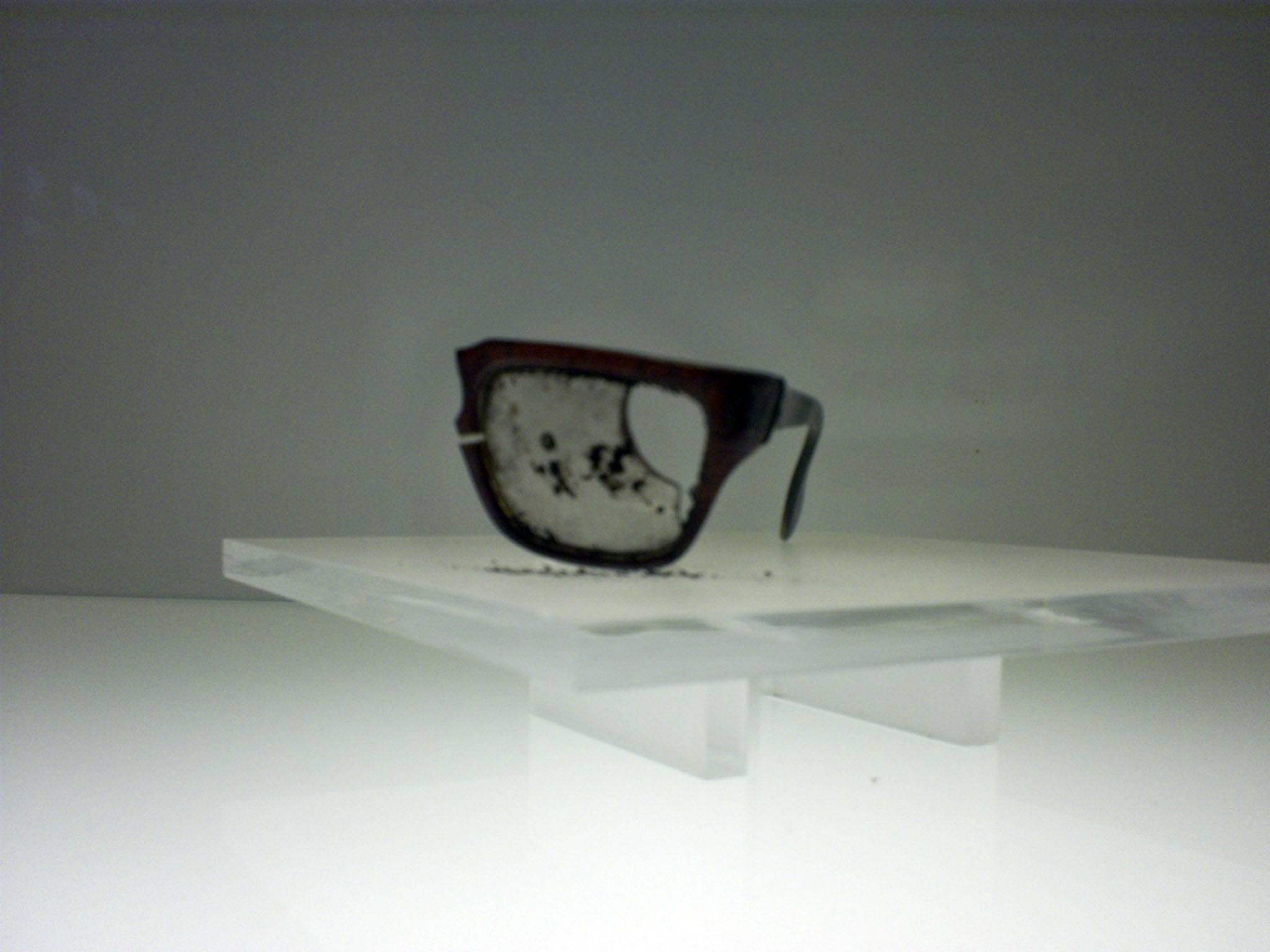
The remains of Salvador Allende's glasses following his death, as displayed in the Chilean National History Museum

In 1984, a memorial stone dedicated to him was erected in the Gajnice neighbourhood of Zagreb. There is a bronze bust of him accompanied by a memorial stone in the Donaupark in Vienna. In Istanbul, a statue of Allende can be found side by side with Mustafa Kemal Atatürk in Ataşehir.

European landmarks named after Allende include one of the major streets in the Karaburma neighborhood of Belgrade, an avenue linking the parishes of Caxias and Paço de Arcos in Oeiras, Portugal, a park in La Spezia, Italy, a bridge in Terni, Italy, and a street in Sokol District, Moscow, which was named after Allende soon after his death. A memorial plaque is also installed there. Further tributes include Salvador Allende Square in the 7th arrondissement of Paris, near the Chilean embassy, the Plaza de Salvador Allende square in Viladecans, near Barcelona, and the Salvador-Allende-Straße avenue and a nearby bridge in Berlin, Streets in several other German cities, especially in former East Germany but also in the West, are named after Allende, as is a street in Szekszárd, Hungary, and Allende Park in Budapest. Allende Avenue (5th Avenue) in Harlow, Essex, was renamed to Zelenskyy Avenue in May 2023 in recognition of the president of Ukraine, Volodymyr Zelenskyy, during the Russo-Ukrainian war.

=== North America ===
In 2009, the Salvador Allende Monument, Montreal, was installed in Parc Jean-Drapeau. A residential street in Toronto has also been named after him.

=== Africa ===
There is a street named after Allende in the capital city of Maputo, Mozambique.

=== Asia ===
The Malaysian rock band Martin Vengadesan & The Stalemate Factor paid tribute with a folk song called The Final Hours Of Salvador Allende which was released in 2018.

=== Postage stamps ===
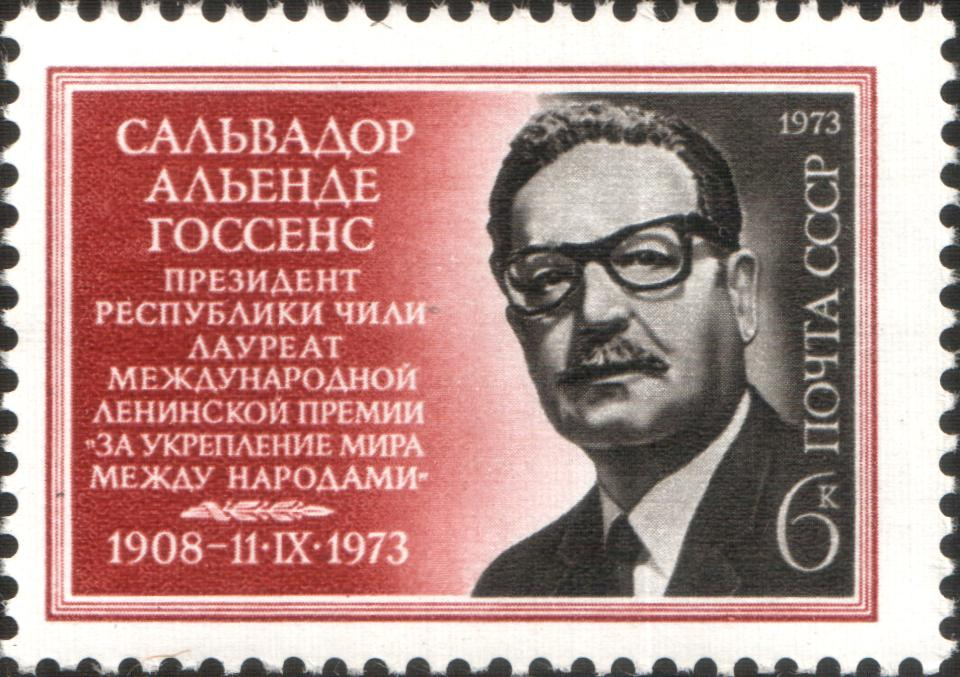
November 1973 USSR postage stamp. Probably the first Allende stamp, released after the coup.

One of the first postage stamps to commemorate Salvador Allende, released after the 1973 coup in Chile, was the Soviet one. It was issued just two months after the event and had a circulation of 3.8 million. The issue was designed by the painter A. Kovrizhkin and bore the title "Salvador Allende Gossens, President of the Republic of Chile, Laureate of the Lenin Peace Prize, 1908 – 11.IX.1973".

A stamp was released by Magyar Posta in Hungary in 1974 shortly after the 11 September 1973 coup in Chile that ended the socialist government of Salvador Allende. The stamp bore an image of Allende that had become popular during his election campaign in 1970.

Two other stamps, both on the tenth anniversary of the coup, represent extreme reactions to the event. Scott Cuba #2605 shows the burning presidential palace of La Moneda ("The Mint") and a picture of Allende. The caption refers to him as having "fallen in combat".

In contrast, Chile, still under the military dictatorship of General Augusto Pinochet at that time, issued Scott Chile #656, labeled "Ten Years of Liberty," celebrating the decade since the fall of Allende and the rise of the junta.

== Public perception ==
Allende is seen as a significant historical figure in Chile. The former social-democratic president Ricardo Lagos honored Allende as a humanist and a statesman.

== Electoral history ==
=== 1952 Presidential election ===
Candidate	Party	Popular vote		Congress vote	
Candidate	Party	Votes	%	Votes	%
Carlos Ibáñez del Campo	Independent	446,439	46.79	132	91.67
Arturo Matte Larraín	Liberal Party	265,357	27.81	12	8.33
Pedro Enrique Alfonso Barrios	Radical Party	190,360	19.95		
Salvador Allende	Socialist Party	51,975	5.45		
Total		954,131	100.00	144	100.00
Valid votes		954,131	99.69	144	82.76
Invalid/blank votes		2,971	0.31	30	17.24
Total votes		957,102	100.00	174	100.00
Registered voters/turnout		1,105,029	86.61	192	90.62
Source: Nohlen, Chilean Electoral Database

=== 1958 Presidential election ===
Candidate	Party	Popular vote		Congress vote	
Candidate	Party	Votes	%	Votes	%
Jorge Alessandri	Independent (Liberal–Conservative)	389,909	31.56	147	84.97
Salvador Allende	Socialist Party	356,493	28.85	26	15.03
Eduardo Frei Montalva	Christian Democratic Party	255,769	20.70		
Luis Bossay	Radical Party	192,077	15.55		
Antonio Zamorano	Independent	41,304	3.34		
Total		1,235,552	100.00	173	100.00
Valid votes		1,235,552	98.82	173	92.51
Invalid/blank votes		14,798	1.18	14	7.49
Total votes		1,250,350	100.00	187	100.00
Registered voters/turnout		1,497,493	83.50	192	97.40
Source: Nohlen, Chilean Electoral Database

=== 1964 Presidential election ===
Candidate	Party	Votes	%
Eduardo Frei Montalva	Christian Democratic Party	1,409,012	56.09
Salvador Allende	Socialist Party	977,902	38.93
Julio Durán	Radical Party	125,233	4.99
Total		2,512,147	100.00
Valid votes		2,512,147	99.27
Invalid/blank votes		18,550	0.73
Total votes		2,530,697	100.00
Registered voters/turnout		2,915,121	86.81
Source: Nohlen, Chilean Electoral Database

=== 1970 Presidential election ===
Candidate	Party	Popular vote		Congress vote	
Candidate	Party	Votes	%	Votes	%
Salvador Allende	Popular Unity	1,070,334	36.61	153	81.38
Jorge Alessandri	Independent (National Party)	1,031,159	35.27	35	18.62
Radomiro Tomic	Christian Democratic Party	821,801	28.11		
Total		2,923,294	100.00	188	100.00
Valid votes		2,923,294	98.93	188	96.41
Invalid/blank votes		31,505	1.07	7	3.59
Total votes		2,954,799	100.00	195	100.00
Registered voters/turnout		3,539,747	83.47	200	97.50
Source: Nohlen, Chilean Election Database, Tricel

== Notes ==
Chamber of Deputies of Chile
Preceded by Humberto Casali Monreal	Member of the Chamber of Deputies for Quillota and Valparaíso; 1937–1939	Succeeded by Vasco Valdebenito García
Political offices
Preceded by Miguel Etchebarne	Minister of Public Health, Social Assistance and Welfare; 1939–1942	Succeeded by Eduardo Escudero
Preceded by Eduardo Frei Montalva	President of Chile; 1970–1973	Succeeded by Augusto Pinochet
Party political offices
Preceded by Marmaduke Grove	Secretary of the Socialist Party of Chile; 1943–1944	Succeeded by Bernardo Ibáñez
Preceded by Bernardo Ibáñez	Socialist nominee for President of Chile; 1952, 1958, 1964, 1970	Succeeded by Patricio Aylwin
Senate of Chile
Preceded by Luis Ambrosio Concha	Senator for Valdivia, Osorno, Llanquihue, Chiloé, Aysén and Magallanes; 1945–1953	Succeeded by Aniceto Rodríguez Arenas
Preceded by Elías Lafertte Gaviño	Senator for Tarapacá and Antofagasta; 1953–1961	Succeeded by Raúl Ampuero Díaz
Preceded by Carlos Alberto Martínez	Senator for Aconcagua and Valparaíso; 1961–1969	Succeeded by Hugo Ballesteros Reyes
Preceded by Tomás Reyes	President of the Senate of Chile; 1966–1969	Succeeded by Tomás Pablo
New constituency	Senator for Chiloé, Aysén and Magallanes; 1969–1970	Succeeded by Adonis Sepúlveda Acuña
