= Paul Zwier =

Lawyer and author

Paul J. Zwier
- Education: Calvin University; Pepperdine University School of Law; Temple University School of Law
- Occupations: Lawyer; author; academic
- Organizations: Emory University School of Law; Guttman Brooks & Buschner
- Awards: Teacher, University of Richmond Law (1991), Honorable Prentice Marshall Faculty Award, NITA (1998)

Paul J. Zwier is a lawyer, author, and academic. He is a former Professor of Law, Director of the Advocacy Skills Program, and Director of the Program for International Advocacy and Dispute Resolution at Emory University, and has been serving as an Of Counsel at Guttman, Buschner & Brooks (GBB).

Zwier is most known for his work in advocacy, negotiation, and mediation skills training, with a focus on legal training for lawyers, torts law, evidence, and case studies regarding international affairs. He is the author of books including Principled Negotiation on an International Stage, Critical Race Theory and the American Justice System, and Effective Expert Testimony. He was awarded the Distinguished Educator award by the University of Richmond in 1991 and the Honorable Prentice Marshall Faculty Award by National Institute for Trial Advocacy (NITA) in 1998.

Zwier has conducted training sessions for judges and lawyers at International Criminal Courts such as the ICC, ICTY, ICTR, and ICT-Sierra Leone.

== Education ==
Zwier completed his Bachelor of Arts degree at Calvin College in 1976, followed by a Juris Doctor degree at Pepperdine University School of Law in 1978, where he also contributed to the Pepperdine Law Review. Subsequently, he obtained his Master of Laws in Legal Education from Temple University School of Law in May 1981.

== Career ==
Zwier has maintained bar admissions in California since 1979 and Virginia from 1984 to 1999. He has served as a speaker and panelist, delivering presentations on topics such as the rule of law, gender-based violence, and law and development at forums including the Law and Development Institute.

Zwier began his professional journey with NITA in 1982 as a Team Leader. Over the years, he assumed various roles within the organization till 2017, including associate director for In-House Training, associate director for Public Programs, and Director of NITA/Emory Deposition Program and Director of NITA Appellate Programs, Motions Programs, and Negotiation Programs. From 2004 to 2018, he served as a Consultant at The Carter Center (TCC), specializing in Syria as a country expert, collaborating with NGO partners on UN-related initiatives to outline a post-conflict vision for Syria, and evaluating TCC's GBV programs in conjunction with Emory's Institute for Developing Nations (IDN). Concurrently, he served on the executive committee of the IDN's Board from 2007 to 2017. As Emory University's Program Director for International Advocacy and Dispute Resolution, he designed training programs for lawyers at international courts and conducted rule of law/advocacy training, collaborating with TCC, Lawyers Without Borders (LWOB), NITA, and the Senior Lawyers Project. In addition, he played a key role in global legal education as the Director of the USAID Emory/Universidad Panamericana Partnership from 2013 to 2016, focusing on oral advocacy education in Mexico, and then took on the role of Director of the PI US Russia Foundation Emory/Ural State/Moscow State Partnership from 2016 to 2018, delivering legal training.

Zwier was appointed as an assistant professor of law at the University of Richmond School of Law in 1980, where he advanced to become an associate professor of law in 1983 and a professor of Law until 1999. Following this, he served as the Professor of Law and Director of the Center for Advocacy and Dispute Resolution at the University of Tennessee, Knoxville, College of Law from 1999 to 2003. In 2003, he joined Emory University School of Law as a professor of Law and remained there until 2023. He has also undertaken visiting professorships at institutions such as Temple University School of Law in 1988–89, and William & Mary Law School in Fall 1998.

== Research ==
Zwier has researched negotiation, mediation, and legal advocacy.

Zwier's early research has explored concepts of tort law such as by the incorporation of economic analysis into tort law, originating from Judge Hand's formulation of a liability equation based on cost–benefit considerations in United States v. Carroll Towing Co. His subsequent studies focused on diverse legal topics, including Non-disclosure agreements (NDAs) and their impact on liberty interests, liquidated damages, injunctions, and arbitration agreements. Additionally, his 2021 work underscored the dual nature of Senate impeachment trials, advocating for clarity in trial procedures and jurisdictional scope to uphold integrity and constitutional roles.

=== Works ===
Zwier has penned books that delve into legal contexts while also offering principles of negotiation and mediation. One of his works, Advanced Negotiation and Mediation Theory and Practice, co-authored with Thomas Guernsey, has underscored a strategic approach to negotiation, blending tactics to optimize outcomes. Fazzi's review, published in the Dispute Resolution Journal, noted, "Experience alone hasn't made a good negotiator, but a lack of it could have been detrimental. For a novice practitioner, reading this book may have helped remedy such a deficiency." His book Principled Negotiation and Mediation in the International Arena: Talking with Evil has intertwined the development of the rule of law with conflict resolution techniques, proposing an approach to international disputes, suggesting that engaging a pragmatic mediator in negotiations with terrorists and other undesirable actors could prove beneficial for the US. Published in 2020, his work Peacemaking, Religious Belief and the Rule of Law investigated how mediators use social media to promote sustainable peace, justice, and forgiveness, using case studies from Syria to evaluate their impact on democracy and peace maintenance within international law.

Among Zwier's works on expert witness management and testimony strategies, his book Expert Rules, co-authored with David M. Malone, highlighted tools to handle expert queries, covering problem approaches, Daubert's impact, and effective examination structures. Badger in his review commented, "The book has discussed everything from finding and feeding an expert to how to prepare one for a deposition." In Effective Expert Testimony, he discussed how lawyers can leverage expert witnesses.

More recently, in 2023 Zwier's work Critical Race Theory and The American Justice System examined how trial lawyers navigated cases involving Black victims killed by white perpetrators, considering CRT skepticism about fair jury judgments and including recent guilty verdicts in high-profile cases that prompted reflection on the American justice system's resilience against CRT critiques. Later in 2023, he published Critical Race Theory and the Struggle at the Heart of Legal Education, a view of the turmoil CRT has caused for legal educators navigating US principles of rule of law.

== Awards and honors ==
- 1998 – Honorable Prentice Marshall Faculty Award, Excellence in Teaching and Program Design, NITA

== Bibliography ==
=== Books ===
- Expert Rules: 100 (and more) Points You Need to Know About Expert Witnesses (1999) ISBN 9781556817212
- Fact Investigation (2000) ISBN 9781556815324
- Legal Strategy (2005) ISBN 9781556819230
- Advanced Negotiation and Mediation, Theory and Practice (2005) ISBN 9781601564795
- Supervisory and Leadership Skills in the Modern Law Practice (2007) ISBN 9781556819919
- Principled Negotiation and Mediation in the International Arena (2013) ISBN 9781107355200
- Exhibit Rules: Tips, Rules, and Tactics for Preparing, Offering and Opposing Exhibits (2013) ISBN 9781601568236
- Effective Expert Testimony (2014) ISBN 9781601563408
- Peacemaking, Religious Belief, and the Rule of Law (2020) ISBN 9780367593582
- Critical Race Theory and the American Justice System (2023) ISBN 9781527593688
- ’’Critical Race Theory and the Struggle at the Heart of Legal Education’’ (2023) ISBN 9781527536234

=== Selected articles ===
- Zwier, P. J. (1981). Cause in Fact in Tort Law-A Philosophical and Historical Examination. DePaul L. Rev., 31, 769.
- Zwier, P. J. (1991). Due Process and Punitive Damages. Utah L. Rev., 407.
- Zwier, P. J., & Hamric, A. B. (1996). The ethics of care and reimagining the lawyer/client relationship. J. Contemp. L., 22, 383.
- Zhang, M., & Zwier, P. J. (2002). Burden of proof: developments in modern Chinese evidence rules. Tulsa J. Comp. & Int'l L., 10, 419.
- Zwier, P. J., & Barney, A. (2012). Moving to an oral adversarial system in Mexico: jurisprudential, criminal procedure, evidence law, and trial advocacy implications. Emory Int'l L. Rev., 26, 189.
- Zwier, P. J. (2021). Impeachment trials after Trump: More trial and less politics. SSRN Electronic Journal.
- Zwier, P. J. (2024). US state abortion law in an international context: Distinguishing religion and politics. SSRN Electronic Journal. https://doi.org/10.2139/ssrn.4748763
