= Soledad Bianchi =

Chilean sociologist

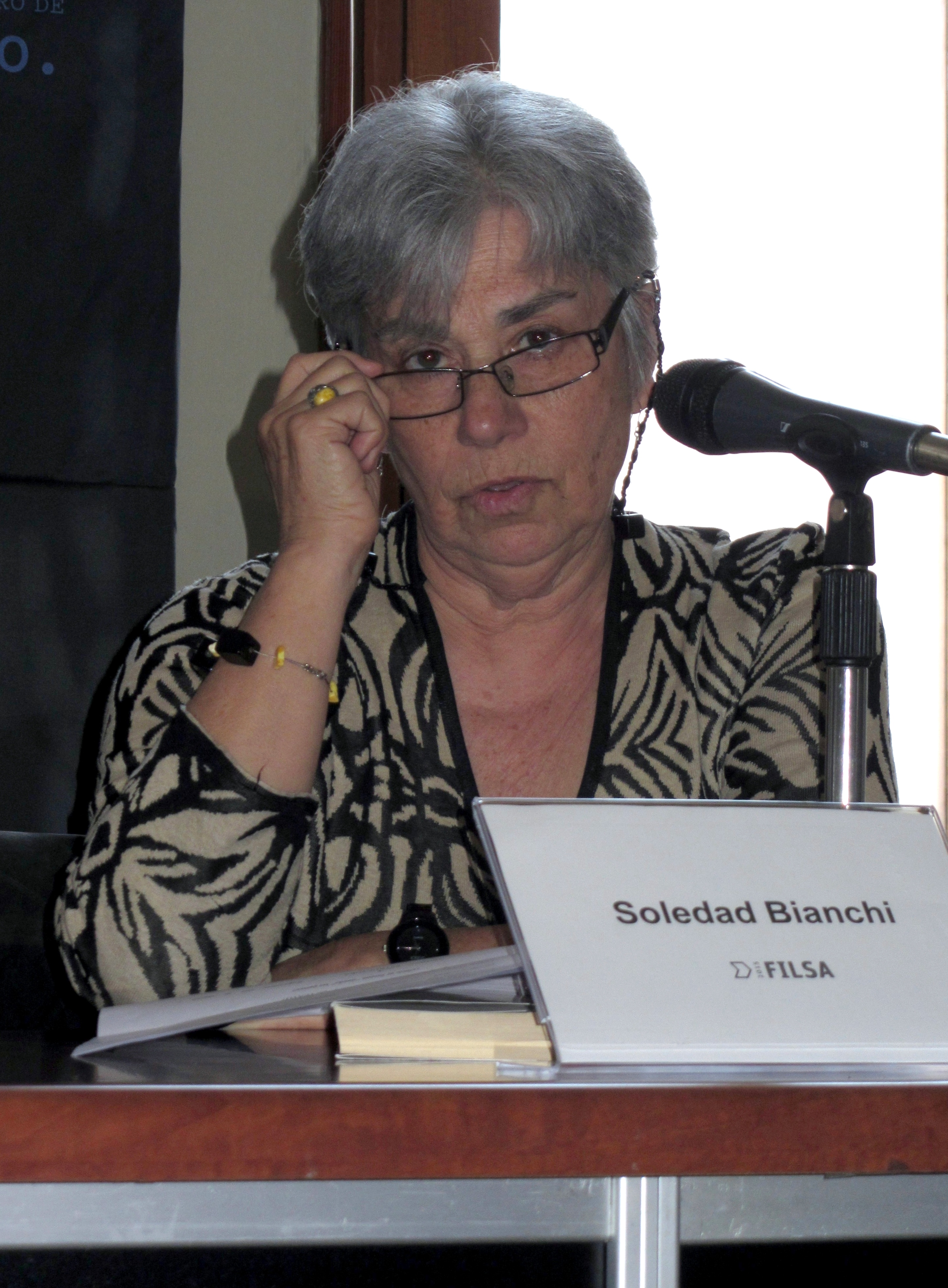
- Bianchi at the Santiago International Book Fair 2015
- Citizenship: Chile
- Known for: Study of Chilean poetry
- Scientific career
- Fields: Sociology of literature
- Workplaces: University of Chile; Pontifical Catholic University of Valparaíso; Paris 13 University

Soledad Bianchi is a Chilean sociologist specialized in the sociology of literature. She went into exile in France during the military dictatorship era.

== Sources ==
- Alcides Jofré, Manuel (1984), "Haciendo Chile en el exilio" (PDF), APSI (in Spanish), no. July 31–August 13, pp. 47–48
