= National Institute for Trial Advocacy =

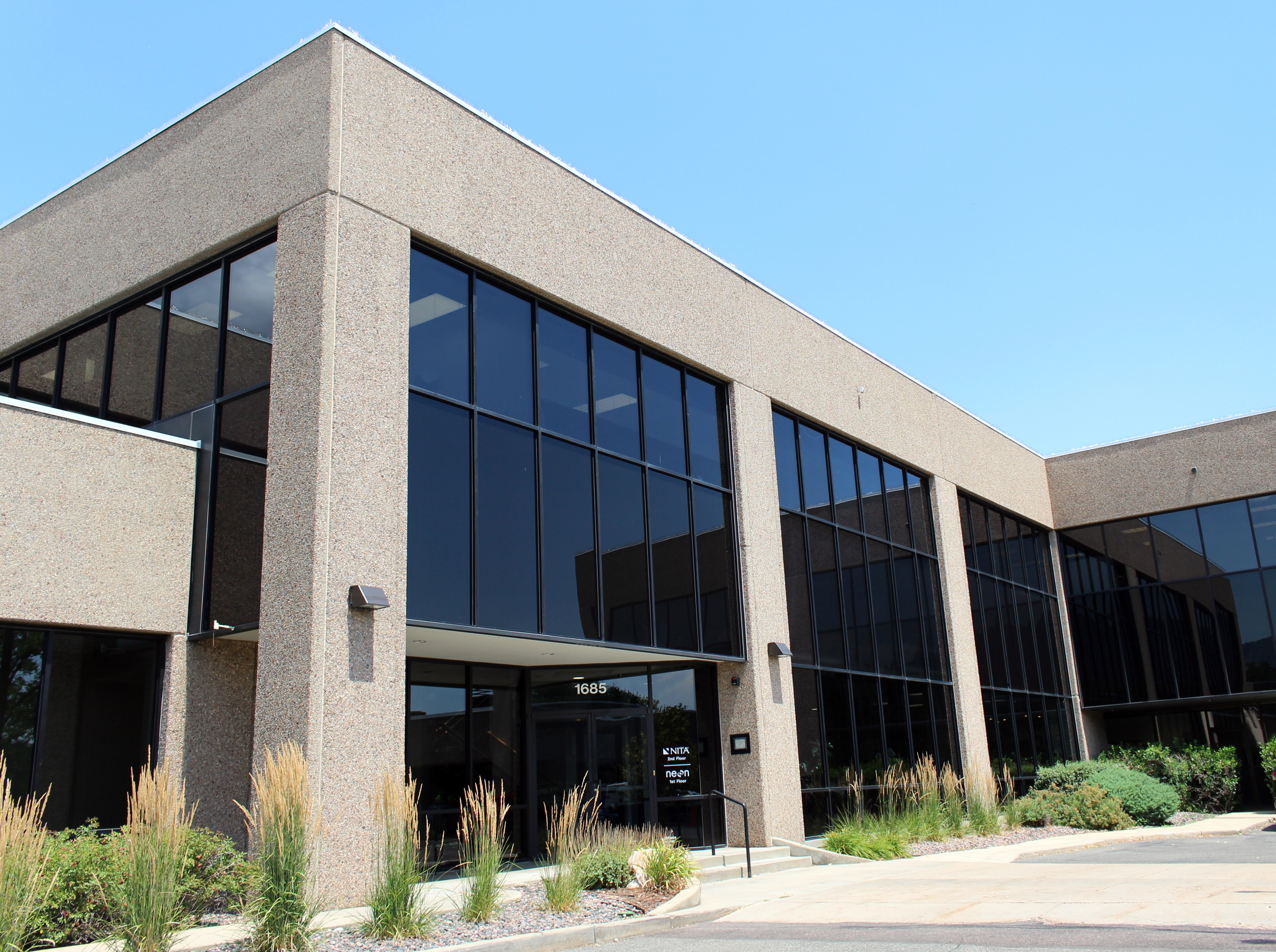
NITA's former headquarters in Boulder (2010-2021)

The National Institute for Trial Advocacy (NITA) is an American not-for-profit organization that provides lawyers with training in trial advocacy skills.

NITA's founding was brought about in 1971 by the Committee on Advocacy of the Section on Judicial Administration of the American Bar Association, which was trying to address a critical shortage of competent trial attorneys. A group of law professors and lawyers concluded that learning-by-doing trial training was the best approach towards filling this gap. NITA's inaugural National Session was held June 25 to July 21, 1972, at the University of Colorado Boulder.

NITA's National Sessions bring together participants from all across the country who are taught through a learning-by-doing approach how to better represent their clients in the courtroom. Prior to the COVID-19 pandemic of 2020-2021 that curtailed in-person meetings and activities for more than a year, the National Session had been held every year since 1972.

In 1972, NITA started holding public service trial training sessions in a variety of specialties across the country as well as other skills courses, including deposition and courtroom technology skills.

During the 1990s and early 2000s, NITA was based in South Bend, Indiana. NITA returned to Colorado in 2003 when it opened its National Education Center (NEC) in Louisville, Colorado, and then moved its headquarters from South Bend into a building adjacent to the NEC in 2006. NITA finally came home to Boulder in October 2010 when it leased part of the former Exabyte headquarters building. After ten years in Boulder, NITA once again returned to Louisville in 2021, where the organization celebrated its 50th anniversary with a year of activities that marked this important milestone.
