= Southern Pacific Nautical Brotherhood =

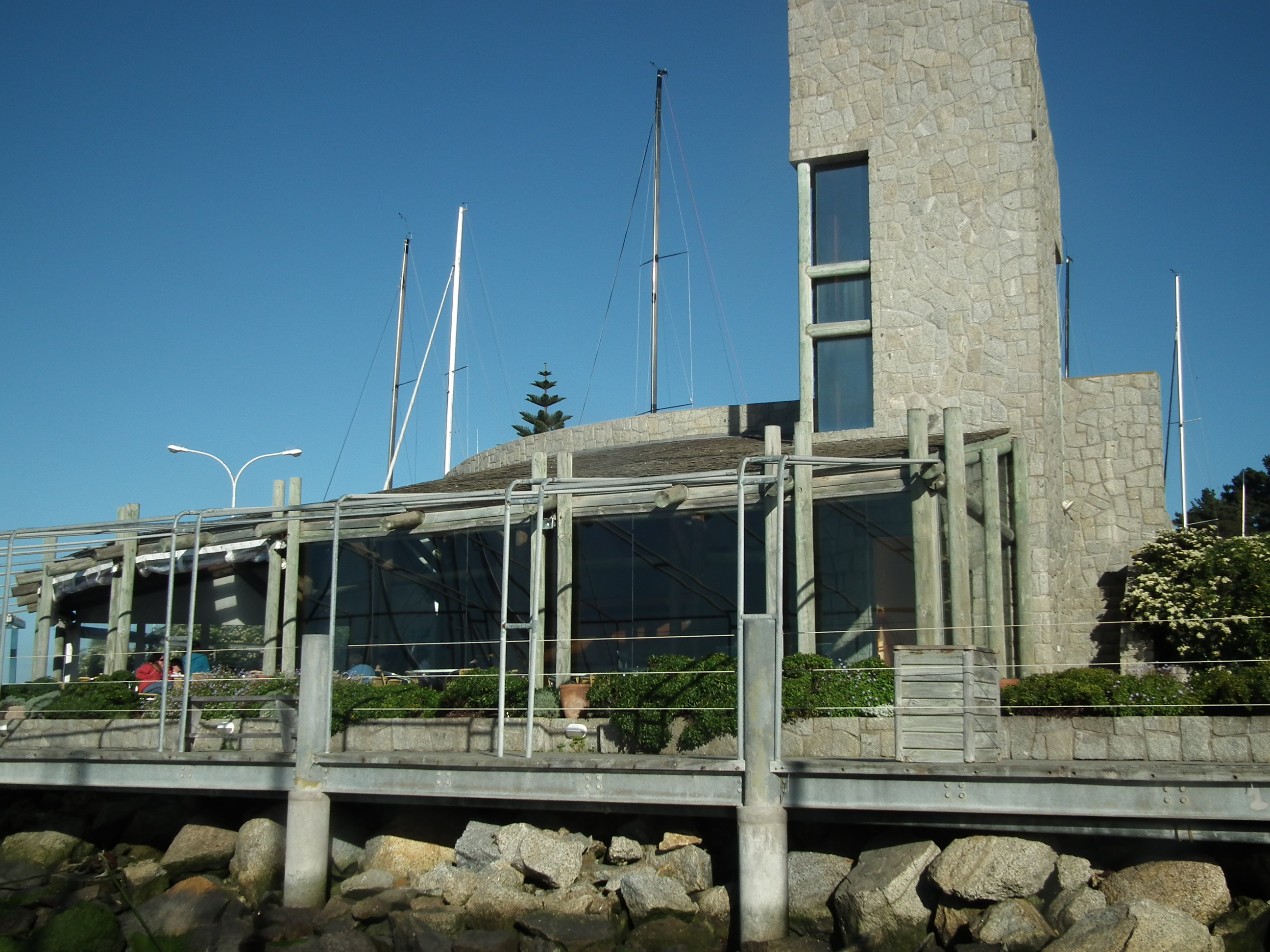
- Nautical Brotherhood Building
- Sport: Sailing
- Founded: 1968
- Location: Algarrobo

Burgee of the Southern Pacific Nautical Brotherhood.

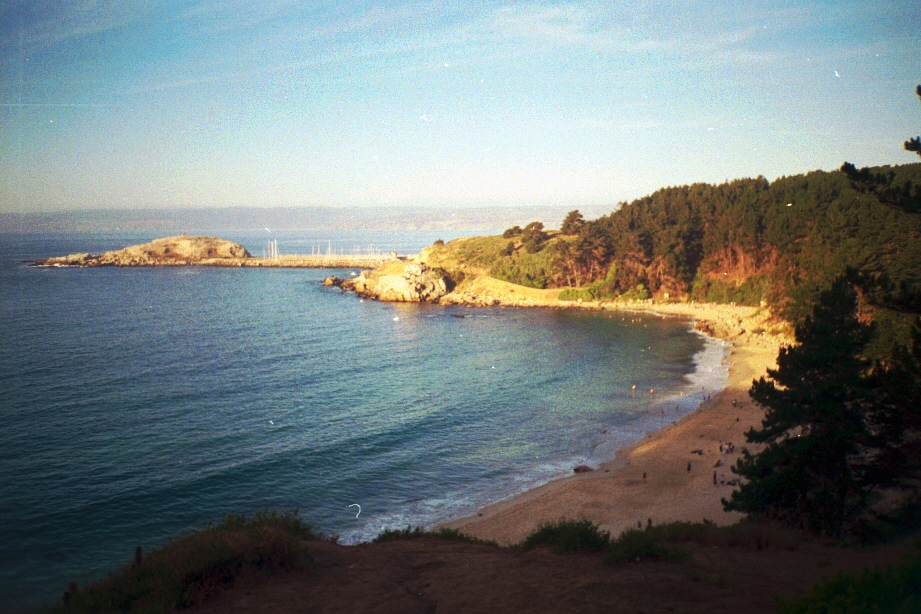
El Canelo Beach (Algarrobo), with the Pájaro Niño islet in the background where you can see the masts of the yachts of the Southern Pacific Nautical Brotherhood

The Southern Pacific Nautical Brotherhood is a nautical club dedicated to sailing and yachting based in Algarrobo, Chile. It operates as a Chilean nautical sports corporation, under private law, whose legal personality was granted by D.S. (J) N.º 1870 on October 17, 1968.

== History ==
It was founded in August 1968 by various people brought together by their interest in water sports. At its founding meeting, they named Agustín Edwards Eastman as the first commodore and José Toribio Merino as vice-commodore.

Founders:

- José Toribio Merino Castro
- Vice-admirals Patricio Carvajal Prado y Arturo Troncoso Daroch.
- Ex-naval officers Roberto Kelly Vásquez y Hernán Cubillos Sallato.
- Civilians Agustín Edwards Eastman, René Silva Espejo, Arturo Fontaine Aldunate, Sergio de Castro Spíkula y otros.

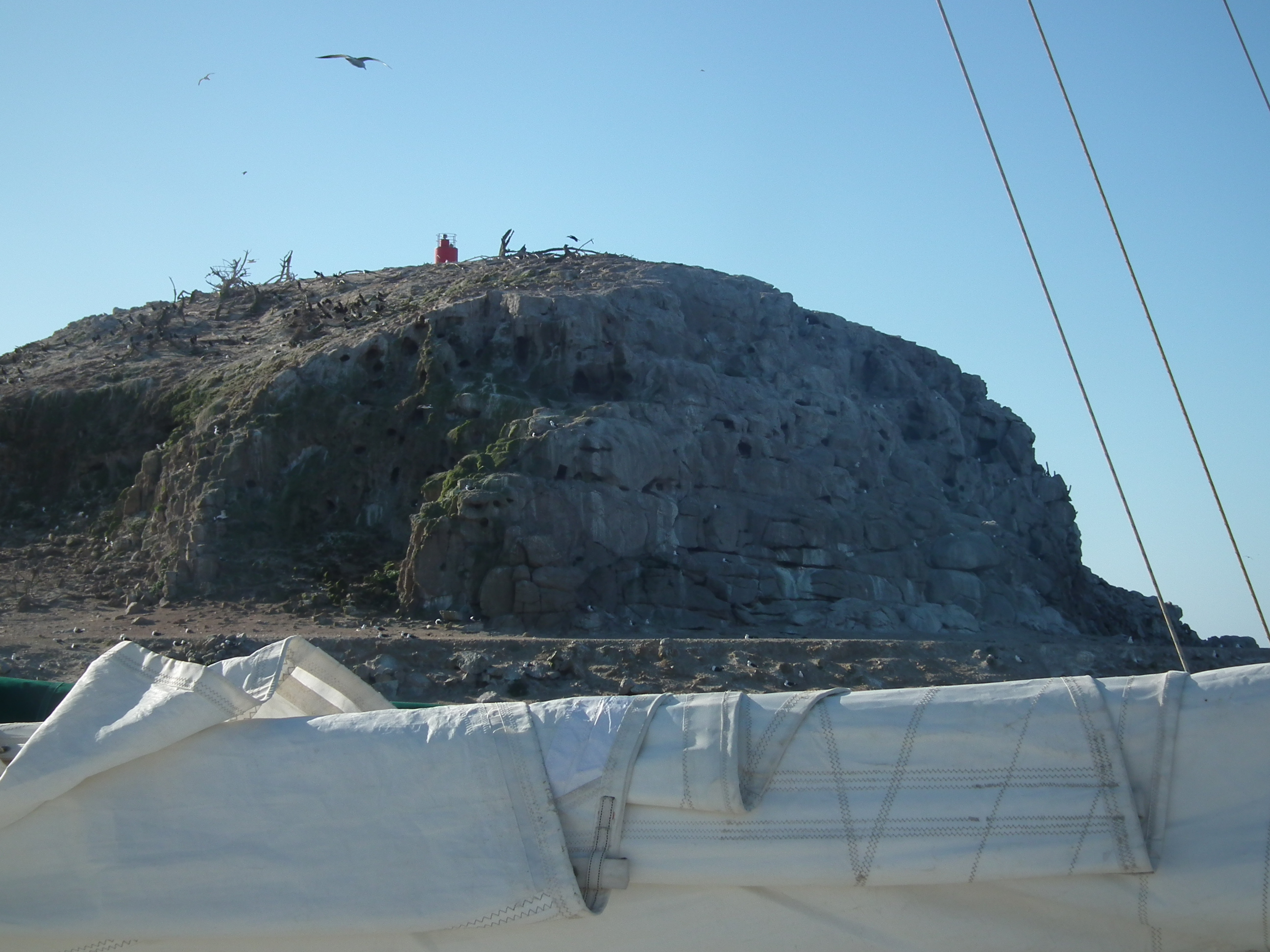
The Pájaro Niño Islet is on the south side of Algarrobo Bay, artificially connected to the Continent by the Southern Pacific Nautical Brotherhood.

== Boat races ==
The Brotherhood has organized the following international boat races:

- Optimist South American Championship in 1985, 1995 and 2019
- J/24South American Championship in 1999
- Lightning South American Championship in 2001
- Soto 40 South American Championship in 2012
- Laser Central and South American Championship in 2013
- J/70 South American Championship in 2017
- Snipe South American Championship in 2019
- Snipe Western Hemisphere and Asia Championship in 2023

== Athletes ==
Among its athletes, Tito González has six world championships, five Pan American medals, eleven South American titles and was chosen as the Best Athlete of Chile in 2005.

Felipe Cubillos was national Sabot champion in 1972 and South American Lightning champion in 1980. Emilio Cousiño and Bernardo Matte, with their Transpac 52 "Pisco Sour", won the Chiloé Regatta twice (2004 and 2006), the Breitling Cup (2004) and the S.M. la Reina trophy (2005), as well as a second and a third place in the Copa del Rey de Vela (2007 and 2004).

María Jesús Seguel Tagle and Matías Clemente Seguel Tagle were Snipe South American champions in 2019, as well as gold medalists at the 2019 South American Beach Games and silver medalists at the 2018 South American Games and the 2017 Bolivarian Games.

== Scandals ==
=== Accusations of collaboration with the Central Intelligence Agency ===
The Brotherhood was an important base in the conspiracy to enact the coup d'etat against Salvador Allende. All its members would hold relevant positions in the military dictatorship of Pinochet, both within it or from outside. The meetings were held in the form of rotating meals at each member's home. All of them, both civilian and military, had active participation in the rebellion against Salvador Allende's government and in unleashing the military coup as part of the dictatorship. The coordination of the intervention was centered in Viña, as General Carlos Prats would later state in The Times of London:.

It was there in Valparaíso where the officers involved in the conspiracy met secretly with a U.S. Marine officer, the same one who would later maintain contact with Admiral Jose Toribio Merino, Chief of the Navy in Valparaíso and member of the Cofradía Náutica del Pacífico Austral (Nautical Brotherhood of the Southern Pacific), the original entity of the coup. That man was Lieutenant Colonel Patrick Ryan.

— General Carlos Prats in The Times of London.

Two years later, the same Horman Agency would cite these meetings between American diplomatic and naval personnel with the Chilean rebels.

Several CIA agents operating in Chile are implicated in the activities of openly seditious groups, including Ambassador Nathaniel Davis, who was in Guatemala during the period when diplomatic and military advisors helped organize fascist terrorist groups such as La Mano Blanca, Nueva Organización Anticomunista and the Consejo Anticomunista de Guatemala, which murdered thousands of students, workers and peasants.

— FIN Agency

These ultra-conservative sailors and civilians were joined by 10 economists graduated from the Catholic University headed by Sergio de Castro, who prepared the economic plan of the Military Junta. Many times members of the Office of Naval Intelligence (ONI) were present in Valparaíso and Chilean naval offices. Some of them would later become involved in the disappearance of the American journalist Charles Horman.

The first meeting to determine the economic plan of the coup was held with most of the economists in August 1972 at the Círculo Español in Santiago. The economists who were Christian Democrats agreed to join in the planning of the economy requested by the Marines. Sergio Undurraga Saavedra, who at that time was head of studies at Sofofa, was another "bricklayer". Dedicated in recent years to financial business, Undurraga presided over the Moneda Asset Investment Fund, and since January 2005, he has headed the Center for Corporate Governance and at the same time kept Eduardo Frei Montalva informed as did the other economists with the National Party.

Ryan replied to these accusations denying the CIA collaboration:

Of personal interest to the author was a London Times article (27/10/73) written by Godfrey Hodgson and William Shawcross, which stated that, "in planning for the coup d'etat, Admiral Jose Toribio Merino maintained close personal liaison with Lieutenant Colonel Patrick J. Ryan, USMC of the U.S. Navy Mission in Valparaiso, Chile". Although I found the London Times reporting of my daily and personal liaison with Admiral Merino most flattering, I also found it completely untrue! During the eight months in Chile preceding the coup, my desk calendar reveals only two appointments with Admiral Merino, and they dealt with strictly mundane matters. These appointments were typical vice admiral lieutenant colonel contacts. He talked, I listened and then carried out his orders. The London Times' report of my liaison duties with Merino in connection with the coup was absolutely false and typified the misinformation and fabricated "facts" that were disseminated to the world regarding the coup in Chile.

Ryan's own interpretation of Chile's political crisis was presented in his book Allende's Chile: 1000 Bungled Days, published in 1976. The work criticized Salvador Allende's government and argued that its policies contributed to Chile's political and economic instability as well as rejecting the Kennedy Amendment, stating:

For ten years the United States fought communism in Vietnam, 7000 miles from California, at a tragic loss of 55,000 American lives, six times as many wounded, not to mention a staggering cost of 150 billion dollars. [...] We lost the war! On the other hand, the Republic of Chile, situated in our hemisphere, fought communism here in America's Backyard, without the aid of B-52's, the 7th Fleet, or even a Bob Hope visit. No American fingers squeezed M-16 triggers, no gruesome parade of American flag draped caskets were airlifted daily from Santiago, Chile, to gravesites in the United States of America. What's more, without our aid, and unencumbered by our tactic of "measured response" the Chileans defeated communism! The United States government not only has not acclaimed Chile's outright defeat of communism, but incredibly, our Senate and Congress, via the Kennedy Amendment to the Foreign Assistance Act, have terminated all military aid to the new anti-communist government of Chile. Why?

— Lieutenant Colonel Patrick J. Ryan, 1976.

=== 1973 Coup d'etat ===
On October 10, 1973, the Southern Pacific Nautical Brotherhood held -at night- its regular meeting at the home of Hernán Cubillos Sallato, president of El Mercurio, in Candelaria Goyenechea Street, in the Vitacura district of Santiago, Chile. The Commodore of the "Brotherhood", José Toribio Merino, newly self-appointed commander in chief of the navy and member of the Military Junta, presided. Merino informed that his proposal to appoint as Minister of Economy the general manager of El Mercurio, Fernando Léniz, had just been approved by the Military Junta. Léniz had asked the Military Junta to lift the closure of El Mercurio's satellite newspaper Las Últimas Noticias, to which the Military Junta immediately agreed to Léniz's request. It ended in the early hours of the morning, when the participants withdrew. On September 11, 1973, at the premises of the Editorial Lord Cochrane, which belonged to the group, El Ladrillo was reproduced and delivered to the officers of the Armed Forces appointed to the dictatorial government. El Ladrillo drew the lines to start acting in a very different dimension to what had been the previous economic policies. It was not only about facing the crisis. "The current situation has been incubating for a long time and has become a crisis only because the erroneous economic policies under which our country has functioned since the crisis of the 1930's have been extreme," he points out. In its pages was the outline that was later called the "modernizations." The coup opened a great opportunity to put their convictions to the test.

=== Projection in the dictatorship ===
It is believed that a group of civilians that were presented by Pinochet's dictatorship were really long-time conspirators and sailors. After the economic change of Chile from a welfare state to a neoliberal one many of them benefited by the transition of state businesses to lower prices as a result of privatization. (Note: Manuel Cruzat Infante, an alumnus of the Catholic University, with a master's degree from Chicago and a doctorate from Harvard, who had been the head of the research department of the BHC group and towards the end of the 70's became a partner of the country's main economic group, together with his brother-in-law Fernando Larraín Peña. Another of the Ladrillo's men was Juan Braun Lyon, Cruzat's inseparable business partner to this day. After the coup in 1974, Cruzat and Larraín came to control close to a hundred companies and had interests in many others. The group's contacts and harmony with the regime, the first privatizations, its audacity and access to international credit were key to the vertiginous growth that turned it into Chile's largest economic empire by the end of the 1970s.)

=== Pájaros Niños Islet ===
Previously, the islet was known as San Pedro Islet, but it was united with the continent through an artificial structure by the end of 1978. This construction altered the natural environment of the islet. In parallel to this modification, it was protected by the Consejo de Monumentos Nacionales, through its declaration as a Nature Sanctuary in 1978, due to the request of the Institute of Political Ecology.

=== Killing of Humboldt penguins ===
The TVN news show 24 horas aired a report against the administration of the Nautical Brother of Algarrobo, demonstrating a note where it showed that they were killing the eggs of the protected Humboldt penguins, to stop the bad odor generated by the birds, that only inhabit the coasts of Peru and Chile and are considered vulnerable according to the International Union for Conservation of Nature.

A peaceful demonstration was held on February 16, 2013 in the commune of Algarrobo, with the aim of stopping the mistreatment of penguins and birdlife in general on Pájaro Niño Island. About three thousand people marched through the streets of Algarrobo, to express their repudiation of the killing of penguins and the destruction of their eggs on the Pájaro Niño islet, as well as the attacks on pelicans and seagulls that inhabit this Nature Sanctuary.

== See also ==
- United States intervention in Chile
