= United States intervention in Chile =

Aspect of bilateral relations since 1811

United States intervention in Chilean politics started during the War of Chilean Independence (1812–1826). The influence of United States in both the economic and the political arenas of Chile has since gradually increased over the last two centuries and continues to be significant.

== Chilean independence ==
The arrival of Joel Roberts Poinsett, in 1811, marked the beginning of U.S. involvement in Chilean politics. He had been sent by President James Madison in 1809 as a special agent to the South American Spanish colonies (a position he filled from 1810 to 1814) to investigate the prospects of the revolutionaries, in their struggle for independence from Spain.

== War scare of 1891 ==
During the 1891 Chilean Civil War, the U.S. backed President José Manuel Balmaceda, as a way to increase their influence in Chile, while Britain backed the successful Congressional forces.

=== Itata incident ===
The Itata incident concerned an attempted shipment of 5,000 rifles in 1891 by the ship Itata of arms purchased in California from Remington. The U.S. Navy was supported with a fleet of a multi-national ships, some from the Royal Navy and Imperial German Kaiserliche Marine. This fleet went to the port of Iquique and convinced the port authorities to hand over the weapons.

=== Baltimore crisis ===
The U.S. Government sent a warship to Chile to protect American interests. The crew of the Baltimore took shore leave at Valparaíso. During the US sailors' shore leave on 16 October 1891, a mob of enraged Chileans angry about the Itata's capture, attacked them. Two American sailors were killed, 17 were wounded and 36 others were jailed. That Valparaíso riot prompted saber rattling from enraged US officials. A war between the U.S. and Chile was remotely possible. Chile's foreign minister escalated the tension, but U.S. Secretary of State James G. Blaine managed to de-escalate rising tensions. The crisis ended when the Chilean government bowed, and while maintaining that the seamen were to blame for the riot, paid an indemnity of $75,000 to the victims' families.

== Early 20th century ==
United States involvement in Chilean affairs intensified in the early decades of the 20th century. After World War I, the United States replaced Britain as the leading superpower controlling most of Chile's resources and economic activity. This shift hindered Chile from profiting as a result of the war and gaining financial independence. The dependence on the United States formally began in the early years of the 1920s as two major US companies, Anaconda and Kennecott, took control of the valuable resources. Up until the 1970s, "both industries controlled between 7% to 20% of the country's gross domestic product".

The conclusion of World War II resulted in a similar situation, as Chile could not exploit the "excess of copper they produced, as almost all the copper was marketed through subsidiaries of United States copper firms established in Chile for whom the allied government fixed a ceiling price upon copper products during the course of the war."

As the working class demanded an improvement in their standard of living, higher wages and improved working conditions, the notion that a left-wing government could be the solution for the people began to take form.

== 1950s and 1960s ==
During the 1950s and 1960s, the United States put forward a variety of programs and strategies, ranging from funding political campaigns to funding propaganda, aimed at impeding the presidential aspirations of left-wing candidate Salvador Allende, who served as President of the Senate (1966–1969) before running a final time to become the 28th president of Chile, which lasted until his death in 1973. Throughout these two decades, left-wing parties in Chile failed to gain power, in part due to the fact that the United States was impeding these parties through various means. In the 1958 presidential election, Jorge Alessandri – a nominal independent with support from the Liberal and Conservative parties – defeated Allende by nearly 33,500 votes to claim the presidency. His laissez-faire policies, endorsed by the United States, were regarded as the solution to the country's inflation problems. Under recommendations from the United States, Alessandri steadily reduced tariffs starting in 1959, a policy that caused the Chilean market to be overwhelmed by American product. These governmental policies angered the working class of Chile, who demanded higher wages, and the repercussions of this massive discontent were felt in the 1961 congressional elections. The president suffered terrible blows, sending the message that laissez-faire policies were not desired. As the "grand total of $130 million from the U.S. banking industry, the U.S. Treasury Department, the IMF and the ICA" accepted by Alessandri illustrates, laissez-faire policies may have induced the opposite of the intended effect – making Chile more dependent on the United States, not less.

Presidential candidate Salvador Allende was a top contender in the 1964 election. The U.S., through the Central Intelligence Agency (CIA), covertly spent three million dollars campaigning against him, before and after the election, mostly through radio and print advertising. The Americans viewed electing Christian Democratic contender Eduardo Frei Montalva as vital, fearing that Alessandri's failures would lead the people to support Allende. Allende was feared by the Americans because of his warm relations with Cuba and his open criticism of the Bay of Pigs Invasion. Furthermore, clandestine aid to Frei was put forward through John F. Kennedy's Latin American Alliance for Progress, which promised "$20 billion in public and private assistance in the country for the next decade."

== The 1970 election ==
According to a U.S. Senate select committee, publishing a Church Commission Report in 1975 to describe international abuses committed by the CIA, NSA, and FBI, covert United States involvement in Chile in the decade between 1963 and 1973 was "extensive and continuous". The CIA spent $8 million in the three years between 1970 and the military coup of September 1973, with over $3 million allocated toward Chilean intervention in 1972 alone. Covert American activity was present in almost every major election in Chile in the decade between 1963 and 1973, but its tangible effect on electoral outcomes is not altogether clear. Chile, more than any of its South American neighbors, had a long-standing democratic tradition dating back to the early 1930s, and it has been difficult to gauge how successful CIA tactics were in swaying voters.

A declassified file from August 19, 1970, reveals the minutes of high-level officials in the CIA known as the "Special Review Group." It was chaired by Henry Kissinger and was sanctioned by President Nixon. This was one of several documents released as part of the Foreign Relations of the United States (FRUS) series dedicated toward US-Chilean interventionalism – collectively known as Foreign Relations of the United States, 1969–1976, Volume XXI, Chile, 1969–1973 and Foreign Relations, 1969–1976, Volume E–16, Documents on Chile, 1969–1973 – that revealed a detailed account of correspondences between each of these officials, telegrams from the Chilean embassy, memorandums, and "special reports" concerning the state of affairs in Chile. For instance, a National Intelligence Estimate from January 28, 1969, stated the problems and conclusions that senior officials in Washington identified over the proliferating crisis in Chile. The document indicates that the 1970 election stood above all other issues as of critical importance, with Chile's political and economic stability depending heavily on that particular election's outcome; the document notes the possibility of out of control economic stagnation and inflation in Chile as concerns. The conclusions of the document suggest that factionalism needed to be addressed, and expounded on United States interests in copper extraction companies operating in Chile. The election represented the potential for important economic relations to collapse or continue. The document further focuses on potential ramifications if the election outcome were to not align with US interests.

At a 8 September 1970 meeting of the 40 Committee, the chairman of the committee asked for an analysis of where the U.S. and CIA stood in terms of taking action to prevent Allende from becoming President of Chile. William Broe, a high-ranking CIA officer, said Eduardo Frei Montalva, the 29th president of Chile, was essential to the situation, regardless of the type of involvement — military or congressional. The 40 Committee asked that the CIA collect information and create more intelligence reports to see what could be further done in Chile. The committee decided it was unlikely they were going to be able to influence the 24 October congressional election to go against Allende. Richard Helms was also concerned about Allende supporters in the Chilean military, as it seemed they would support Allende in the event of a coup. As a result of all this information, the committee requested a full analysis of two things: (1.) a cost-versus-benefit analysis of organizing a military (Chilean) coup; (2.) a cost-versus-benefit analysis of organizing future oppositions to Allende to topple his influence. This presented two options for Henry Kissinger: political maneuvering or outright force.

Four days after the 8 September 1970 meeting of the 40 Committee, a cable between Helms and Henry Kissinger discussed the lack of morale that the U.S. embassy had in Chile according to the American ambassador to Chile, Edward Korry. Kissinger stated in response that he would call another 40 Committee meeting for the following Monday. Kissinger further said "we will not let Chile go down the drain."

== Allende presidency ==
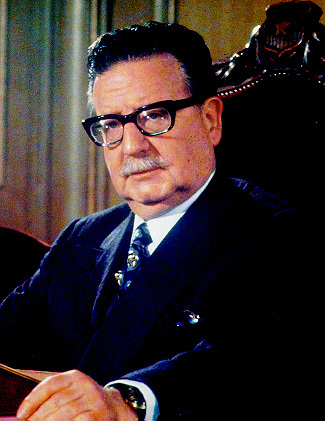
Salvador Allende

Salvador Allende ran again in the 1970 presidential election, winning a narrow victory plurality vote (near 37%). U.S. President Richard Nixon feared that Chile could become "another Cuba" and cut off most foreign aid to Chile. The U.S. Government believed that Allende would become closer to socialist countries such as Cuba and the Soviet Union. They feared that Allende would push Chile into socialism, resulting in the loss of all the U.S. investments made in Chile.

On 15 September 1970, before Allende took office, Richard Nixon gave the order to overthrow him. According to a declassified document from the NSA, the handwritten notes from CIA Director Richard Helms state: "1 in 10 chance perhaps, but save Chile!; worth spending; not concerned; no involvement of embassy; $10,000,000 available, more if necessary; full-time job—best men we have; game plan; make the economy scream; 48 hours for plan of action [sic]." These notes came from a meeting Helms had with President Nixon, indicating the administration's willingness to stage a coup in Chile and the extent to which Nixon was willing to go to do so. On 5 November 1970, Henry Kissinger advised President Nixon against peaceful coexistence with the Allende administration and instead advocated one of two positions. "Track I" was a State Department initiative designed to thwart Allende by subverting Chilean elected officials within the bounds of the Chilean constitution, excluding CIA involvement. Track I expanded to encompass some policies whose ultimate goal was to create the conditions that would encourage a coup. "Track II" was a CIA operation overseen by Henry Kissinger and Thomas Karamessines, the CIA director of covert operations. Track II excluded the State Department and Department of Defense. The goal of Track II was to find and support Chilean military officers who would support a coup.

Immediately after the Allende government came into office, Nixon's administration sought to place pressure on it to limit its ability to implement policies contrary to U.S. and hemispheric interests, such as the total nationalization of several U.S. corporations operating in Chile. Nixon directed that no new bilateral economic aid commitments be undertaken with the government of Chile. The U.S. supported Allende's opponents in Chile during his presidency, intending to encourage either Allende's resignation, his overthrow, or his defeat in the election of 1976. The Nixon administration also covertly funded independent and non-state media and labor unions.

=== Track I ===
Track I was a U.S. State Department plan designed to persuade the Chilean Congress, through outgoing Christian Democratic President Eduardo Frei Montalva, to confirm conservative runner-up Jorge Alessandri as President. Alessandri would resign shortly after, rendering Frei eligible to run against Allende in new elections. As part of the Track I strategy to block Allende from assuming office after the election, the CIA needed to influence a congressional run-off vote required by the Constitution since Allende did not win the absolute majority. Their tactics included political warfare, economic pressure, propaganda, and diplomatic hardball as they aimed to buy enough Chilean senatorial votes to block Allende's inauguration. Should that plan not succeed, U.S. Ambassador Edward Korry would attempt to persuade President Frei to create a constitutional coup. Their last resort was to have the U.S. "condemn Chile and the Chileans to utmost deprivation and poverty, forcing Allende to adopt the harsh features of a police state," Korry told Kissinger. To aid in this mission, the CIA station chief in Brazil, David Atlee Phillips, was brought in along with twenty-three foreign reporters who worked to stir up international opinion against Allende, the centerpiece of this part of the operation being the strong anti-Allende story on the front cover of Time magazine.

=== Track II ===
The CIA had also created a second plan, Track II, in which the agency would find and support military officers willing to participate in a coup. They could then call new elections in which Allende could be defeated.

In September 1970, Nixon authorized the expenditure of $10 million to stop Allende from coming to power or to unseat him. As part of the Track II initiative, the CIA used false flag operatives with fake passports to approach Chilean military officers and encourage them to carry out a coup. A first step to overthrowing Allende required removing General René Schneider, the chief commander of the army. As a constitutionalist, Schneider would oppose a coup d'état. On 18 October 1970, the CIA station in Santiago addressed the logistics of secret weapons and ammunitions for the use in a plot to kidnap Schneider. The CIA provided "$50,000 in cash, three submachine guns, and a satchel of tear gas, all approved at headquarters ..." The submachine guns were delivered by diplomatic pouch.

A group was formed, led by the retired General Roberto Viaux. Considered unstable by the U.S., Viaux had been discouraged from attempting a coup alone. The CIA encouraged him to join forces with an active duty general, Camilo Valenzuela, who had also been approached by CIA operatives. They were joined by Admiral Hugo Tirado, who had been forced into retirement after the Tacnazo insurrection. On 22 October, Viaux went ahead with a plan to kidnap Schneider, but Schneider drew a handgun to protect himself from his attackers, who then shot him in four vital areas. He died in Santiago's military hospital three days later. The attempted kidnapping and Schneider's subsequent death shocked the public and increased support for the Chilean Constitution, the exact opposite of the expected outcome of the planned coup. The Chilean people rallied around their government which, in turn, overwhelmingly ratified Allende on 3 November 1970.

On 25 November 1970, Henry Kissinger issued a memorandum that detailed the Covert Action Program that the U.S. would undertake in Chile. In the memorandum, Kissinger stated that there were five principles of the program. The U.S. would continue to maintain contacts in the Chilean military, take steps to divide Allende's supporters, cooperate with the media to run anti-Allende propaganda campaigns, support non-communist political parties in Chile, and publish materials stating that Allende did not adhere to the democratic process and also wanted to form connections with Cuba and the Soviet Union.

A CIA and White House cover-up obscured American involvement, despite Congressional investigative efforts. The Church Committee, which investigated U.S. involvement in Chile during this period, determined that the weapons used in the kidnapping attempt "were, in all probability, not those supplied by the CIA to the conspirators."

After Schneider's death, the CIA recovered the submachine guns and money it had provided. Both Valenzuela and Viaux were arrested and convicted of conspiracy after Schneider's assassination. One of the coup plotters who escaped arrest requested assistance from the CIA and was paid $35,000, so "The CIA did, in fact, pay 'hush' money to those directly responsible for the Schneider assassination—and then covered up that secret payment for thirty years."

In 1970, the U.S. manufacturing company ITT Corporation owned 70 percent of Chitelco, the Chilean Telephone Company, and funded El Mercurio, a Chilean right-wing newspaper. The CIA used ITT as a conduit to financially aid opponents of Allende's government. On 28 September 1973, ITT's headquarters in New York City were bombed by the Weather Underground for the alleged involvement of the company in the overthrow of Allende.

On 10 September 2001, a suit was filed by Schneider's family accusing former U.S. Secretary of State Henry Kissinger of arranging an assassination because Schneider would have opposed a military coup. CIA documents indicate that while the agency had sought to kidnap him, his death was never intended. Kissinger said he had declared the coup "hopeless" and had "turned it off". However, the CIA claimed that no such "stand-down" order was ever received.

== 1973 coup ==
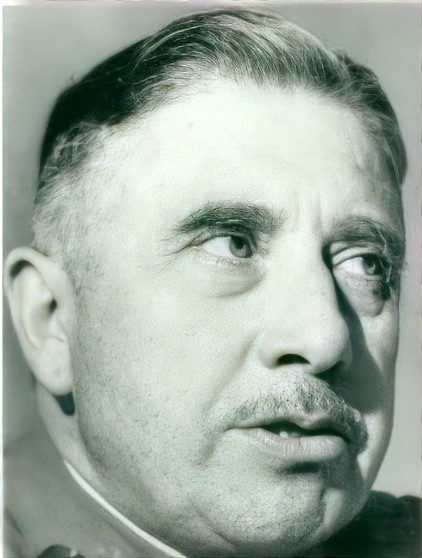
Augusto Pinochet in 1974

On 11 September 1973, Augusto Pinochet rose to power, overthrowing the democratically elected president Salvador Allende. A subsequent September 2000 report from the CIA, using declassified documents related to the military coup, found that the CIA "probably appeared to condone" the 1973 coup, but that there was "no evidence" that the US actually participated in it. This view has been challenged by some authors, who have stated that the covert support of the United States was crucial to the preparation for the coup, the coup itself, and the consolidation of the regime afterwards. It seemed to the CIA that, even if this coup did not come together, Allende would still have a very difficult political future. This point of view has been supported by non-scholarly commentary.

According to the CIA document "CIA Activities in Chile", dated 18 September 2000, the local CIA station suggested during late summer 1973 that the US commit itself to support a military coup. In response, CIA Headquarters reaffirmed to the station that "there was to be no involvement with the military in any covert action initiative; there was no support for instigating a military coup."

On the issue of CIA involvement in the 1973 coup, the CIA document is equally explicit:

On 10 September 1973 – the day before the coup that ended the Allende government – a Chilean military officer reported to a CIA officer that a coup was being planned and asked for US government assistance. He was told that the US Government would not provide any assistance because this was strictly an internal Chilean matter. The Station Officer also told him his request would be forwarded to Washington. CIA learned of the exact date of the coup shortly before it took place. During the attack on the Presidential Palace and its immediate aftermath, the Station's activities were limited to providing intelligence and situation reports.

The report of the Church Committee, published in 1975, stated that during the period leading up to the coup, the CIA received information about potential coup plots.

The intelligence network continued to report throughout 1972 and 1973 on coup plotting activities. During 1972 the Station continued to monitor the group which might mount a successful coup, and it spent a significantly greater amount of time and effort penetrating this group than it had on previous groups. This group had originally come to the Station's attention in October 1971. By January 1972 the Station had successfully penetrated it and was in contact through an intermediary with its leader.

Intelligence reporting on coup plotting reached two peak periods, one in the last week of June 1973 and the other during the end of August and the first two weeks in September. It is clear the CIA received intelligence reports on the coup planning of the group which carried out the successful September 11 coup throughout the months of July, August, and September 1973.

The Church report also considered the allegation that the US government involved itself in the 1973 coup:

Was the United States DIRECTLY involved, covertly, in the 1973 coup in Chile? The Committee has found no evidence that it was.

There is no hard evidence of direct U.S. assistance to the coup, despite frequent allegations of such aid. Rather the United States – by its previous actions during Track II, its existing general posture of opposition to Allende, and the nature of its contacts with the Chilean military – probably gave the impression that it would not look with disfavor on a military coup. And U.S. officials in the years before 1973 may not always have succeeded in walking the thin line between monitoring indigenous coup plotting and actually stimulating it.

Ultimately, while the CIA may not have a direct hand in the military coup, as some declassified documents do not establish a direct hand of the CIA role in the military coup, the information gleaned from some of these documents is enough to establish a close connection between the CIA and various fashions of the coup plotting, and emphasize its indirect hand to at least end the tenure of Allende. One such document dated September 7, 1973, shared an in-depth knowledge the CIA had on the road map to the immediate day of the coup. In the document, a CIA officer informed the White House that a coup was imminent and was going to take effect on September 8, 1973. The CIA officer whose name was kept hidden in the document, in updating the White House on the situation and current development in Chile, reported some level of a consensus among "three services" including the military, and opposing parties to the Allende government, to force him out of power through Self-Resignation as pressure asserted on him from the "rightist National Party". In the event that Allende resisted such an attempt, which he eventually did, the Militantly then "finalized" its "decision" to force him out of office through a coup. In another breadth, the CIA showcased its close connection with the coup plotters, through its knowledge about a change in the military plan in which "some armed forces units wanted to" carried out "as early as the 8th " "but were dissuaded by higher-ranking officers" who said "could not possibly be put together until 10 September", as "the need for a coordinated effort" was lacking from both ranks.

According to the historian Sebastián Hurtado, there isn't documentary evidence to support that the United States Government acted actively in the coordination and execution of the September 11 coup actions by the Chilean Armed Forces; however, Richard Nixon's interest from the beginning was that the Allende government would not be consolidated and acted actively and decisively in the campaign to destabilize his government.

The CIA in their report, was confident that Allende was definitely going to be ousted from office, and that a "coup appears to have the support of all the service commanders", which neither Allende nor his supporters could resist. And that Allende was aware that any attempt "to oppose the military could result in heavy casualties." The CIA informed the White House about the National Police of Chile's knowledge about an imminent coup, who were in "contact with plotters and have agreed not to resist the military if a coup is attempted." This level of knowledge the CIA shared with the White House not only demonstrated an effective way the agency deployed in picking intelligence, but also its closed network or otherwise indirect involvement in the coup.

On one breadth, the CIA entrusted in the non-friendly political atmosphere in Chile at the time which opposed Allende's government would eventually force him out of office, "should no coup develop." The CIA reported that the "rightist National Party" was a step further "demanding Allende’s resignation" on the backdrop of his "incompetence." This incompetence and non-friendly opposed political atmosphere were a direct economic orchestration by the CIA that made Chile ungovernable, a situation the National Parties aimed to use to their advantage.

Transcripts of a phone conversation between Kissinger and Nixon reveal that they did not have a hand in the final coup. They do take credit for creating the conditions that led to the coup. Kissinger says that "they created the conditions as great as possible." Nixon and Kissinger also discussed how they would play this event with the media and lamented the fact that, if this were the era of Eisenhower, then they would be seen as heroes. There was a PDB that had a section on Chile dated 11 September 1973 that is still completely censored, as was an entire page on Chile provided to Nixon on 8 September 1973. Additionally, a cable from CIA operative Jack Devine dated 10 September 1973, confirmed to top U.S. officials that the coup would take place the following day. In collaboration with the coup, a Defense Intelligence Agency summary, also dated on 8 September and classified "Top Secret Umbra", provided detailed information on an agreement among the Chilean Army, Navy, and Air Force to move against Allende on 10 September. As the CIA denies its involvement in the coup, another cable sent from the agency on 8 September classified "Secret" had information on the Chilean Navy time and date to overthrow the government of President Allende. The cable also identified key Chilean officials who were supporting the coup. The cables from around this time with another one stating that the coup was postponed in order to improve tactical coordination and would attempt the coup on 11 September.

Following the coup on 12 September, "The President's Daily Brief," written as a top secret briefing paper by the CIA for Nixon, reported on the events of the coup as that day's first principal development. In this briefing, there is no indication that the U.S. played any significant role in the coup. The CIA only reported the known facts of the situation, such as the state of the Chilean government and the unconfirmed reports of Allende committing suicide. In the last paragraph of the section on Chile, the CIA reported that "The only strong reaction from among Latin American governments has come from Cuba."

A CIA intelligence report 25 October 1973, concerning General Arellano Stark, noted that Arellano had ordered the deaths of 21 political prisoners. Also, the disappearances of 14 other prisoners were also believed to be on the order of Arellano. General Arellano was considered Pinochet's right-hand man after the coup.

Historian Peter Winn has argued that the role of the CIA was crucial to the consolidation of power that followed the coup; the CIA helped fabricate a conspiracy against the Allende government, which Pinochet was then portrayed as preventing. He states that the coup itself was possible only through a three-year covert operation mounted by the United States. He also points out that the US imposed an "invisible blockade" that was designed to disrupt the economy under Allende, and contributed to the destabilization of the regime. Peter Kornbluh, director of the National Security Archive's Chile Documentation Project, argues in his book The Pinochet File that the US was extensively involved and actively "fomented" the 1973 coup. Authors Tim Weiner, in his book, Legacy of Ashes, and Christopher Hitchens, in his book, The Trial of Henry Kissinger similarly argue the case that US covert actions actively destabilized Allende's government and set the stage for the 1973 coup. Joaquin Fermandois criticized Kornbluh's "black and white" and "North American centered conception of world affairs", stating that a variety of internal and external factors also played a role and that a careful reading of the documentary record reveals the CIA was largely "impotent".

Conservative scholar Mark Falcoff alleged that Cuba and the Soviet Union supplied several hundred thousand dollars to the socialist and Marxist factions in the government. Additionally, documents transcribed and provided by KGB defector Vasili Mitrokhin detail the relationship between Allende and the KGB starting in 1953. Allende's KGB file documents "systematic contact" starting in 1961. KGB support for Allende's 1970 campaign included $400,000 in initial financing, with additional funding including a "personal subsidy" of $50,000 to Allende, as well as bribing a left wing Senator $18,000 to persuade him not to stand as a presidential candidate and to remain within the Unidad Popular coalition. Peter Winn noted that "the Chilean revolution always kept to its peaceful road, despite counterrevolutionary plots and violence." Moreover, this strong emphasis on nonviolence was precisely to avoid revolutionary terror which had blemished the reputations of the French, Russian and Cuban revolutions.

Allende later committed suicide, with an article in The Atlantic stating "he committed suicide under mysterious circumstances as troops surrounded his place, ushering in more than 15 years of military dictatorship under Augusto Pinochet". Former CIA agent Jack Devine, who was active in the CIA during the time of the coup, told The Atlantic that overthrowing Allende's government was not the CIA's decision, but rather the decision of the White House, particularly President Nixon. The coup and U.S. involvement remain an important episode, as a New York Times report in October 2017 indicates.

== Pinochet regime ==
The U.S. provided material support to the military regime after the coup, although criticizing it in public. A document released by the U.S. Central Intelligence Agency (CIA) in 2000, titled "CIA Activities in Chile", revealed that the CIA actively supported the military junta after the overthrow of Allende and that it made many of Pinochet's officers into paid contacts of the CIA or U.S. military, even though some were known to be involved in human rights abuses.

CIA documents show that the CIA had close contact with members of the Chilean secret police, DINA, and its chief Manuel Contreras (paid asset from 1975 to 1977 according to the CIA in 2000). Some have alleged that the CIA's one-time payment to Contreras is proof that the U.S. approved of Operation Condor and military repression within Chile. The CIA's official documents state that at one time, some members of the intelligence community recommended making Contreras into a paid contact because of his closeness to Pinochet; the plan was rejected based on Contreras' poor human rights track record, but a single payment was made due to a miscommunication. In the description of the CIA's activities in Chile, it is acknowledged that one of their high-level contacts was more predisposed to committing abuse: "although the CIA had information indicating that a high-level contact was a hard-liner and therefore more likely to commit abuses, contact with him was allowed to continue in absence of concrete information about human rights abuses."

A report dated 24 May 1977 also describes the newfound human rights abuses that may have been occurring in Chile: "reports of gross violation of human rights in Chile, which had nearly ceased earlier this year, are again on the rise...the Pinochet government is reverting to the practices that jeopardized its international standing since the 1973 coup." The document also details how these human rights violations could have caused a worsening of Chile's status on the international stage. It seems that the United States was unable to plan around these violations, as is referred to with the document's mention of high-ranking officials taking parts in the abuses also.

On 6 March 2001, The New York Times reported the existence of a recently declassified State Department document revealing that the United States facilitated communications for Operation Condor. The document, a 1978 cable from Robert E. White, the U.S. ambassador to Paraguay, was discovered by Professor J. Patrice McSherry of Long Island University, who had published several articles on Operation Condor. She called the cable "another piece of increasingly weighty evidence suggesting that U.S. military and intelligence officials supported and collaborated with Condor as a secret partner or sponsor."

In the cable, Ambassador White relates a conversation with General Alejandro Fretes Davalos, chief of staff of Paraguay's armed forces, who told him that the South American intelligence chiefs involved in Condor "keep in touch with one another through a U.S. communications installation in the Panama Canal Zone which covers all of Latin America". This installation is "employed to co-ordinate intelligence information among the southern cone countries." White, whose message was sent to Secretary of State Cyrus Vance, was concerned that the U.S. connection to Condor might be revealed during the then ongoing investigation into the deaths of the 44 year old former Chilean diplomat Orlando Letelier and his American colleague Ronni Moffitt. Her husband Michael Moffit was in the car during the bombing, but was the only survivor. "It would seem advisable," he suggests, "to review this arrangement to insure that its continuation is in U.S. interest."

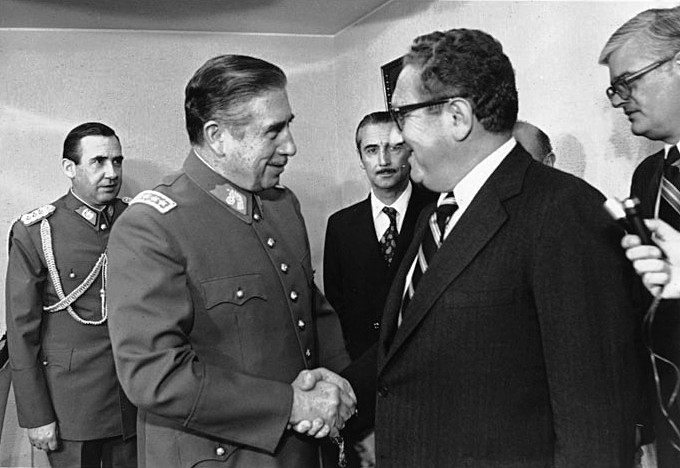
Chilean leader Augusto Pinochet shaking hands with U.S. Secretary of State Henry Kissinger in 1976

The document was found among 16,000 State, CIA, White House, Defense, and Justice Department records released in November 2000 on the nearly 17-year long Pinochet dictatorship in Chile, and Washington's role in the violent coup that brought his military regime to power. The release was the fourth and final batch of records released under the Clinton Administration's special Chile Declassification Project.

During the Pinochet regime, four American citizens were killed: Charles Horman, Frank Teruggi, Boris Weisfeiler, and Ronni Karpen Moffit. Later on, in late August 1976, the United States Government stated in a State Department Secret Memorandum, that the United States Government did play an indirect role in the death of one of the four American citizens, Charles Horman. The memorandum states:

"Based on what we have, we are persuaded that: The GOC sought Horman and felt threatened enough to order his immediate execution. The GOC might have believed this American could be killed without negative fall-out from the USG. There is some circumstantial evidence to suggest: U.S. intelligence may have played an unfortunate part in Horman's death. At best, it was limited to providing or confirming information that helped motivate his murder by the GOC. At worst, U.S. intelligence was aware the GOC saw Horman in a rather serious light and U.S. officials did nothing to discourage the logical outcome of GOC paranoia."- Department of State, Secret Memorandum, "Charles Horman Case," 25 August 1976 (uncensored version)

On 30 June 2014, a Chilean court ruled that the United States played a key role in the murders of Charles Horman and Frank Teruggi. According to Judge Jorge Zepeda, U.S. Navy Captain Ray E. Davis, who commanded the U.S. military mission in Chile, gave information to the Chilean government about Horman and Teruggi that resulted in their arrest and execution in the days following the coup. The Chilean Supreme Court sought to have Davis extradited from Florida to stand trial, but he was secretly living in Santiago and died in a nursing home in 2013.

Michael Townley in 1978.

In a document declassified under the Obama administration's Chilean declassification project, documents were released stating that the CIA suspected Pinochet himself of personally giving the order for the assassination of Ronni Moffitt and Orlando Letelier. Although they were unable to gather enough intelligence that proved that he gave the order, they received shocking evidence from Chilean Major Armando Fernandez, who they convinced to come to the capital to provide them information, that Pinochet was directly involved in covering up the incident. Another declassified copy of a CIA special intelligence assessment on Pinochet's role in the Letelier and Moffitt assassinations were presented to Chilean President Bachelet in 2016. That document asserts the CIA believed that Pinochet "personally ordered his intelligence chief to carry out the murder." Even with the evidence that they had, U.S. Secretary of State George Shultz did not feel that there was enough to indict Pinochet but instead used the information to try to convince Reagan to change their policy with Chile. Pinochet stepped down from power in 1990 and died on 10 December 2006, without facing trial.

In the Michael Townley trial, he attributed responsibility for the orders to the DINA. In contrast, Chilean military officers Raúl Iturriaga Neumann and Manuel Contreras claimed that the assassination orders received by Townley in the various Chile-related cases came exclusively from the CIA, questioning his account and accusing him of lying to implicate the DINA and Pinochet, a thesis that Townley anticipated and explicitly denied in his private confessions. The Junta and Pinochet claimed to have not known of Townley’s existence until he was accused of being the author of the Letelier case. General Contreras lied and assured them he had no connection to Townley, something he also denied three times in 1976 and in 1978 during a meeting about his extradition. Based on those assurances, Pinochet agreed to hand him over to the U.S. Since Townley also participated in the assassination attempts on Prats and Leighton, and Pinochet was accused by the U.S. justice system of the attack on Orlando Letelier. The U.S. intelligence believed the attack on Letelier was ordered by Pinochet, without knowing the details of the Dina-Junta meetings.

On a letter from March 1978 from Michael Townley to the DINA chief Manuel Contreras, he said "I accept that there are things to do and it's better not to inform higher ups. But in my judgement, the physical elimination abroad, with all its risks and possible consequences, especially in the U.S., where there is perhaps the best police force in the world, is not one of them. [...] In my judgement the greatest error has been not informing his Excellency, the truth and real magnitude of this problem. Without this, his Excellency was unable to act or give someone the necessary authority to act [...] So, I support: That if his Excellency is presented with the truth, it is possible and probable that you will be removed from every position, where the Government can be protected. [...] I ask you: To tell his Excellency the truth of this situation, so that he can use his authority as he can."

=== The US. pressures the Philippines to cancel Pinochet's state visit ===
In 1980, Philippine President Ferdinand Marcos had invited the entire Junta (consisting at this point of Pinochet, Merino, Matthei, and Mendoza) to visit the country as part of a planned tour of Southeast Asia in an attempt to help improve their image and bolster military and economic relations with the Philippines, Japan, South Korea, and Hong Kong. Due to intense U.S. pressure at the last minute (while Pinochet's plane was halfway en route over the Pacific), Marcos cancelled the visit and denied Pinochet landing rights in the country. Pinochet and the junta were further caught off guard and humiliated when they were forced to land in Fiji to refuel for the planned return to Santiago, only to be met with airport staff who refused to assist the plane in any way (the Fijian military was called in instead), invasive and prolonged customs searches, exorbitant fuel and aviation service charges, and hundreds of angry protesters who pelted his plane with eggs and tomatoes. The usually stoic and calm Pinochet became enraged, firing his Foreign Minister Hernán Cubillos, who had played an important role during the crisis with Argentina and had helped Chile emerge from international economic isolation, as well as several diplomats, and expelling the Philippine Ambassador. Imelda Marcos later claimed that the cancellation was due to pressure from U.S. President Jimmy Carter. Relations between the two countries were restored only in 1986 when Corazon Aquino assumed the presidency of the Philippines after Marcos was ousted in a non-violent revolution, the People Power Revolution.

=== Kennedy Amendment and other embargoes against Chile ===
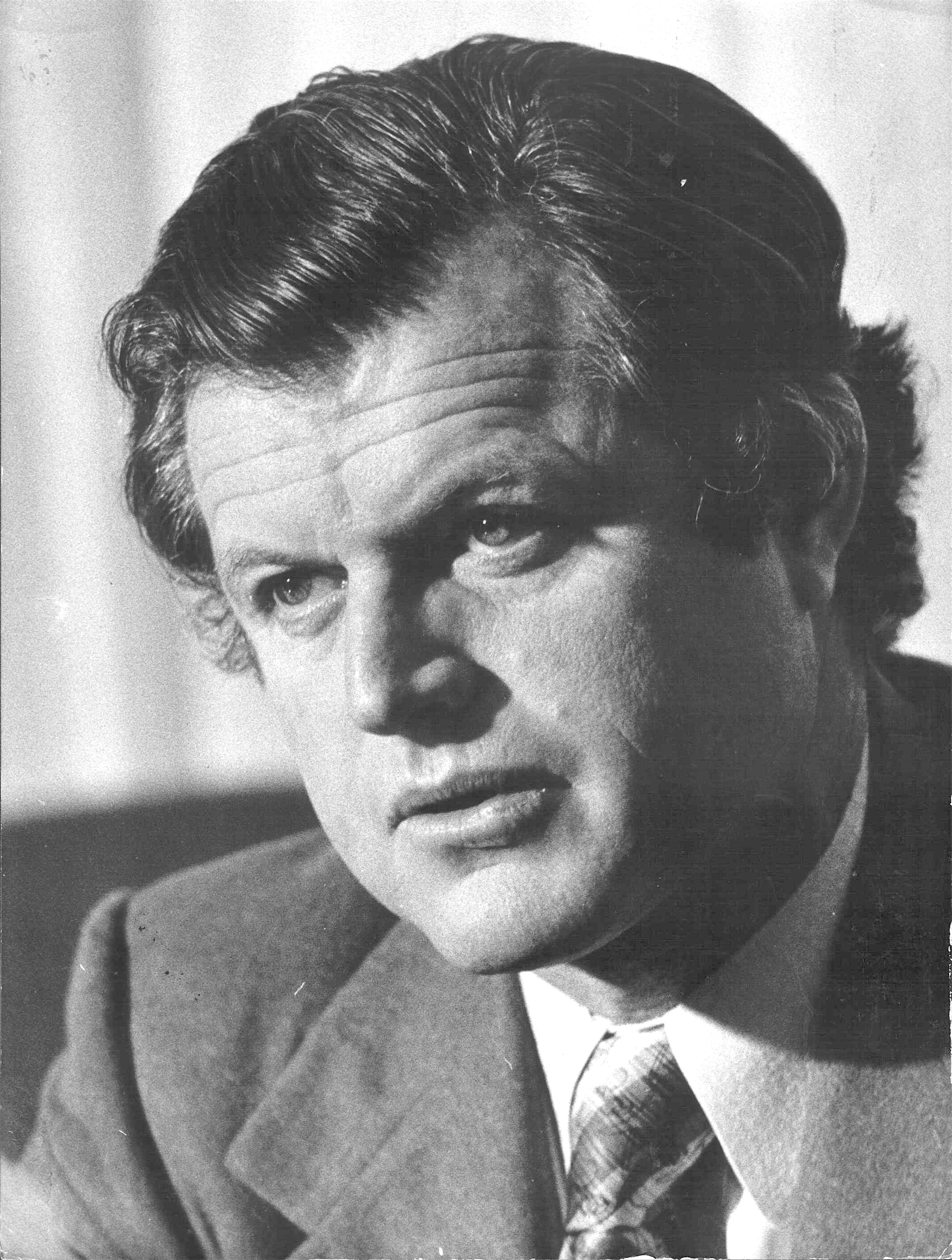
The United States senator Edward "Ted" Kennedy promoted an arms embargo against Latin American military dictatorships, affecting Chile during a period of strong regional tension with its neighbors.

The previous drop in foreign aid during the Allende years was immediately reversed following Pinochet's ascension; Chile received US$322.8 million in loans and credits in the year following the coup. There was considerable international condemnation of the military regime's human rights record, a matter that the United States expressed concern over as well after Orlando Letelier's 1976 assassination in Washington DC. (Kennedy Amendment, later International Security Assistance and Arms Export Control Act of 1976).

Among the countries that sold arms to Chile during the United States embargo imposed under the Kennedy Amendment were Rhodesia, Francoist Spain (under Francisco Franco), South Africa (under the apartheid regime; see above), Brazil, India, South Korea, China and Israel, which also sold aircraft and weapons to Argentina during the Beagle conflict and the Falklands War.

In addition to domestic arms production by FAMAE, Chilean businessman Carlos Cardoen began manufacturing weapons such as cluster bombs from 1977 onwards, reportedly at the request of Pinochet in the context of the U.S. arms embargo.

Cardoen later sold weapons to Saddam Hussein in Iraq and to Libya, leading the United States to issue an extradition request against him in the 1990s.

U.S.M.C. Lieutenant Colonel Patrick J. Ryan discussed the Chilean coup and the Kennedy Amendment in his 1976 book titled "Allende's Chile: 1000 Bungled Days", stating:

For ten years the United States fought communism in Vietnam, 7000 miles from California, at a tragic loss of 55,000 American lives, six times as many wounded, not to mention a staggering cost of 150 billion dollars. [...] We lost the war! On the other hand, the Republic of Chile, situated in our hemisphere, fought communism here in America's Backyard, without the aid of B-52's, the 7th Fleet, or even a Bob Hope visit. No American fingers squeezed M-16 triggers, no gruesome parade of American flag draped caskets were airlifted daily from Santiago, Chile, to gravesites in the United States of America. What's more, without our aid, and unencumbered by our tactic of "measured response" the Chileans defeated communism! The United States government not only has not acclaimed Chile's outright defeat of communism, but incredibly, our Senate and Congress, via the Kennedy Amendment to the Foreign Assistance Act, have terminated all military aid to the new anti-communist government of Chile. Why?

— Lieutenant Colonel Patrick J. Ryan, 1976.

Trade with China and other states was also used as a way to break international isolation and achieve economic projection. Chile established with China "strict observance of the principle of non-intervention in the internal affairs of each country", in contrast to Western and First World countries, which maintained a more distant stance toward Chile. Chile imported oil from China, although the trade balance remained favorable to Chile.

In 1989, the Chilean grape scare occurred: the United States detected cyanide in two grapes originating from Chile, leading authorities to order the suspension of all Chilean fruit shipments and their complete withdrawal from the market. The measure triggered a bilateral crisis with significant economic consequences and also had effects on Chile's domestic politics, which at the time was undergoing a transition toward democracy.

=== US. interference in favor of the "No" option in the 1988 referendum ===
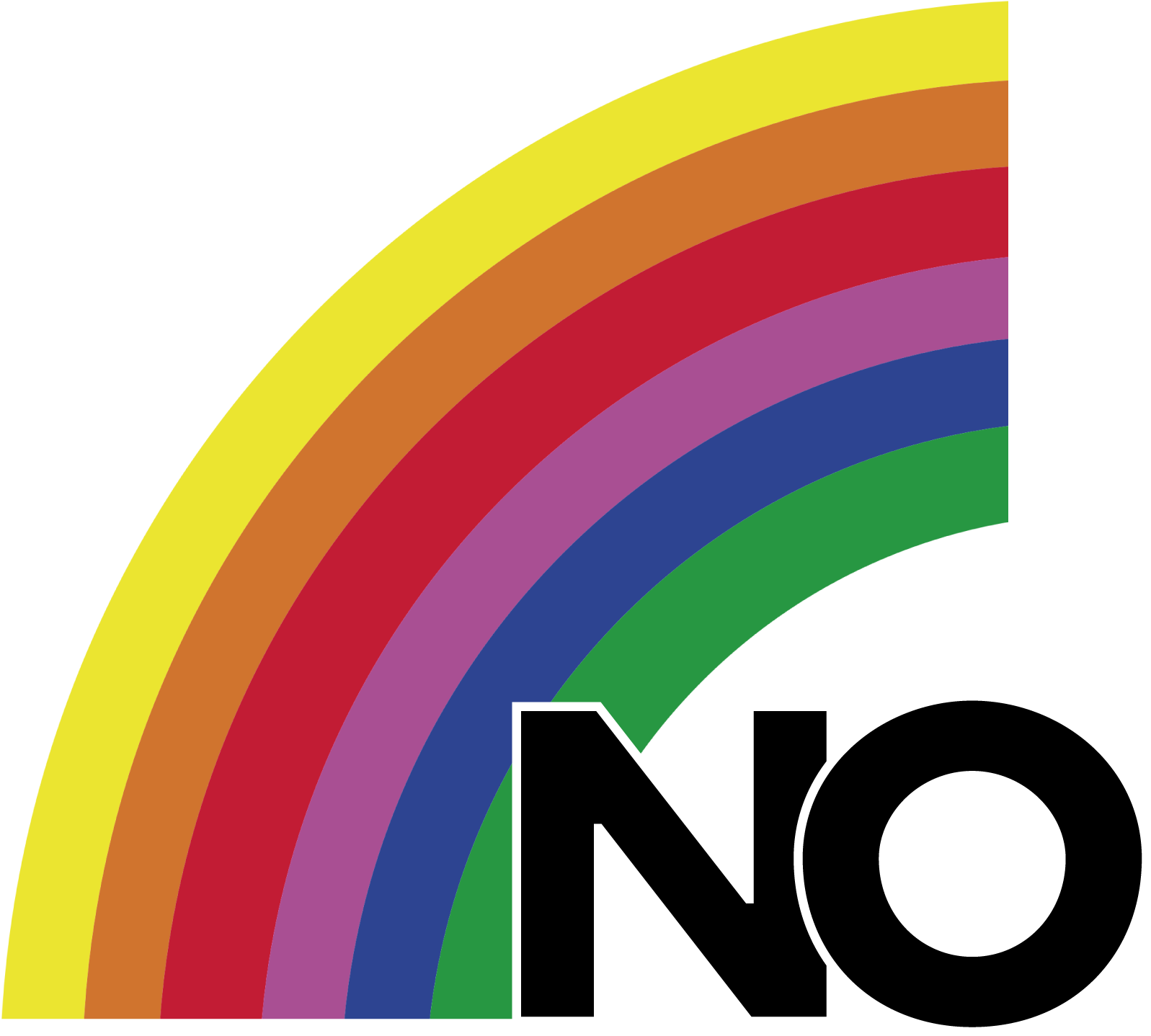
The United States helped the "No" option in the referendum.

Hungarian-American investor and philanthropist George Soros provided advice to the "No" campaign, according to Máximo Pacheco Matte. The support was reflected "in carrying out studies and obtaining data that gave us information that had been hidden from us for 17 years (...) What we learned there was crucial for the preparation of the famous television program for the 'No' campaign and for the victory in the plebiscite."

Likewise, the organization created by the United States Congress, National Endowment for Democracy and linked to the CIA together with the National Democratic Institute for International Affairs contributed one million dollars to the "No" campaign and sent observers to the plebiscite and established a parallel counting system in conjunction with German think tanks and the "Committee for Free Elections". Furthermore, David Altman notes that Pinochet allowed "a certain degree of freedom to carry out a mobilization campaign against the regime."

== Politics in the 21st century ==
U.S. President Bill Clinton ordered the release of numerous documents relating to U.S. policy and actions toward Chile. The documents produced by various U.S. agencies were opened to the public by the U.S. State Department in October 1999. The collection of 1,100 documents dealt with the years leading up to the military coup.

Regarding Pinochet's rise to power, the CIA concluded in a report issued in 2000 that: "The CIA actively supported the military junta after the overthrow of Allende but did not assist Pinochet to assume the presidency." However, the 2000 report also stated that: "The major CIA effort against Allende came earlier in 1970 in the failed attempt to block his election and accession to the presidency. Nonetheless, the U.S. Administration's long-standing hostility to Allende and its past encouragement of a military coup against him were well known among Chilean coup plotters who eventually took activities of their own to oust him."

A White House press release in November 2000 acknowledged that "actions approved by the U.S. government during this period aggravated political polarization and affected Chile's long tradition of democratic elections"

In a 2003 town hall with students, high school student James Doubek asked Secretary of State Colin Powell about the United States support for the coup, to which Powell replied that "it is not a part of American history that we're proud of".

During U.S. President Barack Obama's visit to Chile in 2011, the center-left coalition of Chilean political parties asked Obama to apologize for past U.S. support of Pinochet. In an interview with the Associated Press, President Piñera said his government was "categorically committed to contribute to the search for truth so that justice is done in all of these human rights cases". Obama did not respond to requests for an apology but said during a press conference that U.S. relations with Latin America had at times been "extremely rocky," and that people needed to learn from and understand history but not be trapped by it.

In February 2018, in an effort to create a "lasting counterpoint", a statue honoring the slain Chilean diplomat and think tank policy analyst Orlando Letelier was erected on Massachusetts Avenue in Washington, D.C., near the location where Letelier was killed in a 1976 car bombing on the orders of Pinochet. The attack also claimed the life of Ronnie Karpen Moffitt, Letelier's 25-year-old American co-worker. Michael Moffitt, husband of Ronnie Moffitt and also in the vehicle, survived the attack. The Chilean-orchestrated assassination had brought state-sponsored terrorism by an American-backed ally to American soil. Three of Letelier's sons, and a granddaughter whom Letelier never met, attended the unveiling. The unveiling of Letelier's commemorative statue came less than two years after the Obama administration had released a "long classified CIA analysis...[that] cited 'convincing evidence that President Pinochet personally ordered his intelligence chief to carry out the murder.'" Letelier had served as Chile's ambassador to the United States under Chile's democratically elected Allende government. After Pinochet's 1973 coup, Letelier became a political prisoner and sought political asylum in the United States, where he eventually came to spearhead the economic policy mission of a D.C.-based think tank, the Institute for Policy Studies, as well as organize international condemnation of Pinochet's regime. The Institute for Policy Studies has long incorporated the advancement of human rights into the core of its mission.

== See also ==
- Project FUBELT
- History of Chile
- Chile under Allende
- David H. Popper, US ambassador to Chile (1974–77)
- Family Jewels (Central Intelligence Agency)
- Foreign electoral intervention
- Military dictatorship of Chile (1973–90) - aftermath of the coup
- Latin America–United States relations
- Foreign interventions by the United States
- United States involvement in regime change
