= Kennedy Amendment to the Foreign Assistance Act (1976) =

Arm embargo against Chile, Argentina, Brazil and Uruguay during the Cold War

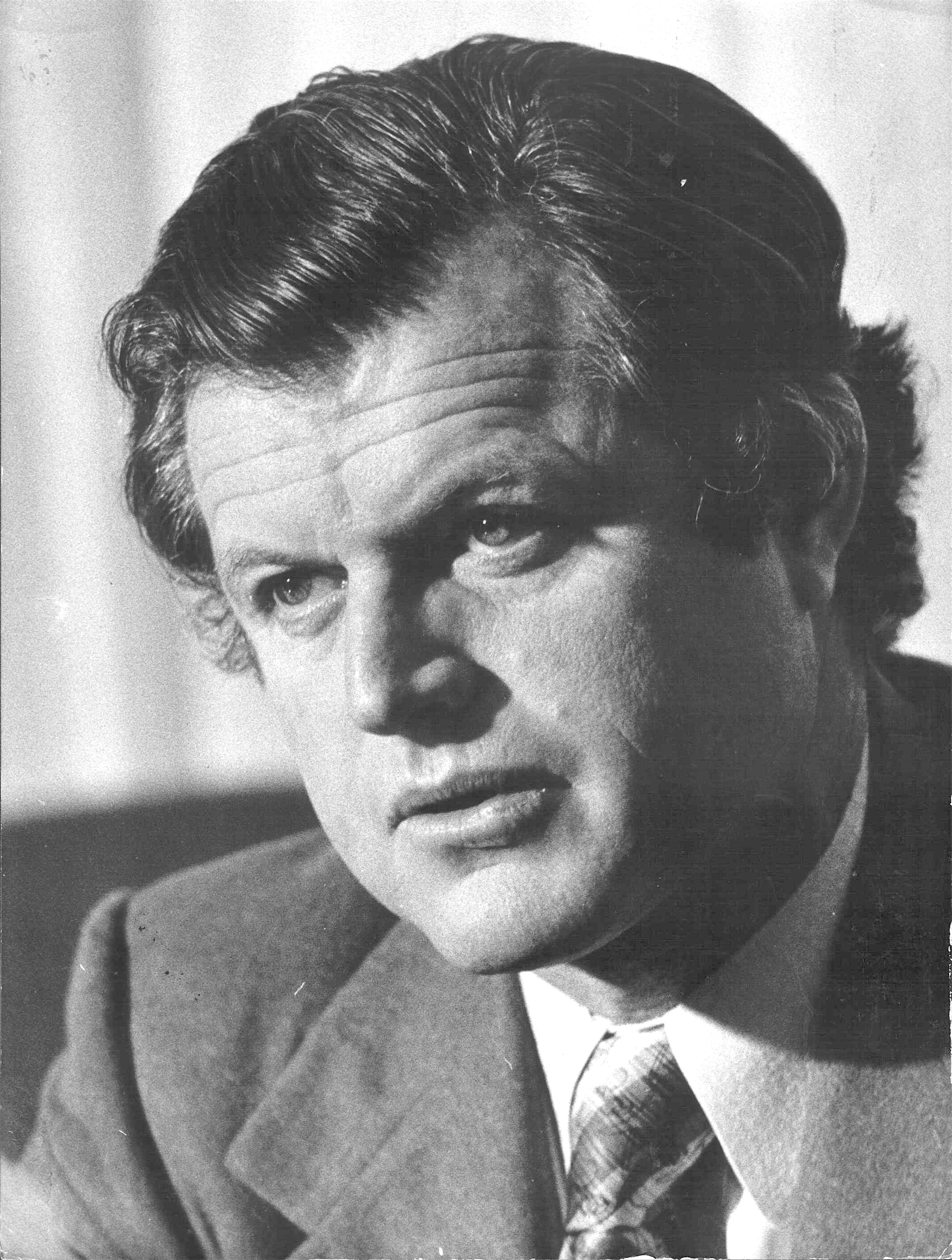
The United States senator Edward "Ted" Kennedy promoted an arms embargo against Latin American military dictatorships, affecting Chile during a period of strong regional tension with its neighbors.

The Kennedy Amendment (Section 502B of the Foreign Assistance Act) was a legislative provision passed by the United States Congress on June 30, 1976, that restricted military assistance and the sale of U.S. arms to Chile during the military dictatorship of Augusto Pinochet. The measure was mainly promoted by Senator Edward Kennedy and affected Chile at a time of high tension with its neighboring countries.

Although the amendment is primarily associated with Chile, it was part of a broader shift in U.S. foreign policy driven by Congress during the 1970s, which introduced human rights conditions on military and economic aid to several Latin American countries, including Argentina, Uruguay, and Brazil since 1978. The amendment was applied since the Presidency of Gerald Ford and was also supported by Senator Hubert Humphrey.

== Background ==
Following the overthrow of President Salvador Allende on 11 September 1973, various national and international organizations denounced human rights violations.

Although the administrations of Richard Nixon and Gerald Ford maintained relations with the Chilean government, the U.S. Congress increasingly expressed concern about the situation in Chile.

In 1975 there were officials from the Embassy and the Policy Planning Office of the Department of State who requested that economic and military aid to Chile be cut off, but these proposals were rejected by the ambassador and officials from the Pentagon and the Department of the Treasury.

== Content ==
The Kennedy Amendment prohibited or limited the granting of loans, guarantees, and military assistance to Chile, as well as restricting exports of military equipment.

The legislation was part of a broader set of measures by the United States Congress aimed at linking foreign aid to respect for human rights.

== Impact ==
The implementation of the amendment reduced Chile's access to U.S. weaponry, forcing the government to diversify its suppliers.

In 1977 and 1978, the Beagle conflict between Argentina and Chile brought the two countries close to war, later mediated by Pope John Paul II. At the same time, Peruvian dictator Juan Velasco Alvarado planned a possible invasion of Chile in 1975, which was ultimately not carried out.

This contributed to the deterioration of bilateral relations between Chile and the United States during the 1970s and 1980s.

Among the countries that sold arms to Chile during the United States embargo imposed under the Kennedy Amendment were Rhodesia, Francoist Spain (under Francisco Franco), South Africa (under the apartheid regime), Brazil, India, South Korea, China and Israel.

The latter also sold aircraft and weapons to Argentina during the Beagle conflict and the Falklands War.

In addition to domestic arms production by FAMAE, Chilean businessman Carlos Cardoen began manufacturing weapons such as cluster bombs from 1977 onwards, reportedly at the request of Pinochet in the context of the U.S. arms embargo.

Cardoen later sold weapons to Saddam Hussein in Iraq and to Libya, leading the United States to issue an extradition request against him in the 1990s.

Trade with China and other states was also used as a way to break international isolation and achieve economic projection. Chile established with China “strict observance of the principle of non-intervention in the internal affairs of each country”, in contrast to Western and First World countries, which maintained a more distant stance toward Chile.

Chile imported oil from China, although the trade balance remained favorable to Chile.

Investigations into the assassination of Orlando Letelier, carried out by double agent Michael Townley in Washington, D.C. in 1976, intensified this pressure.

In the Townley trial, he attributed responsibility for the orders to the DINA. In contrast, Chilean military officers Raúl Iturriaga Neumann and Manuel Contreras claimed that the assassination orders received by Townley in the various Chile-related cases came exclusively from the CIA, questioning his account and accusing him of lying to implicate the DINA and Pinochet. In 1978 the Junta and Pinochet claimed to no have known Townley’s existence. General Contreras lied and assured them he had no connection to Townley several times. Based on those assurances, he was handed over to the U.S.

== Reactions ==
The Chilean government described the amendment as interference in domestic affairs.

Human rights organizations considered it a significant international pressure measure against the military dictatorship.

U.S.M.C. Lieutenant Colonel Patrick J. Ryan discussed the Chilean coup and the Kennedy Amendment in his 1976 book titled "Allende's Chile 1000 Bungled Days", stating:

For ten years the United States fought communism in Vietnam, 7000 miles from California, at a tragic loss of 55,000 American lives, six times as many wounded, not to mention a staggering cost of 150 billion dollars. The Vietnam debacle, authored and orchestrated by a decade of politicians in Washington to the ludicrous battle cry of "measured response" strained our national unity as no other event in our history since the Civil War. What did we accomplish at this horrendous price? We lost the war! On the other hand, the Republic of Chile, situated in our hemisphere, fought communism here in America's Backyard, without the aid of B-52's, the 7th Fleet, or even a Bob Hope visit. No American fingers squeezed M-16 triggers, no gruesome parade of American flag draped caskets were airlifted daily from Santiago, Chile, to gravesites in the United States of America. What's more, without our aid, and unencumbered by our tactic of "measured response" the Chileans defeated communism! The United States government not only has not acclaimed Chile's outright defeat of communism, but incredibly, our Senate and Congress, via the Kennedy Amendment to the Foreign Assistance Act, have terminated all military aid to the new anti-communist government of Chile. Why?

— Lieutenant Colonel Patrick J. Ryan, 1976.

== See also ==
- Foreign Assistance Act
- Carlos Cardoen
- United States intervention in Chile
- 1988 Chilean presidential referendum#Foreign interference
- 1989 Chilean grape scare
- Direct negotiations between Chile and Argentina in 1977–1978
