= Patrick Ryan =

Patrick Ryan may refer to:

== Arts and entertainment ==
- Patrick Earl Ryan, American author
- Patrick Ryan (English author) (1916–1989), English novelist
- Patrick Ryan (American author) (born 1965), American novelist and editor

== Law and politics ==
- Patrick G. Ryan (1838–1906), Canadian leather manufacturer and politician in New Brunswick
- Patrick J. Ryan (New York judge) (1861–1940), American lawyer, politician, and judge
- Patrick Ryan (Irish politician) (1898–1944), Irish Sinn Féin politician from Tipperary
- Patrick D. Ryan (1920–2004), Irish politician, mayor of Galway
- Patrick W. Ryan (died 1993), Irish politician
- Pat Ryan (politician) (Patrick Kevin Ryan, born 1982), American politician
- Patrick J. D. Ryan, member of the States of Jersey

== Military ==
- Patrick J. Ryan (lieutenant colonel) (1931–2013), American Marine and intelligence officer, lawyer, and Chilean consul

== Religion ==
- Patrick John Ryan (1831–1911), Irish-American bishop
- Patrick J. Ryan (chaplain) (1902–1978), Chief of Chaplains of the U.S. Army
- Patrick Joseph Ryan (1904–1969), Australian priest and anti-communist organizer
- Patrick Ryan (Irish priest) (1930–2025), Irish Catholic priest and IRA arms supplier
- Patrick Finbar Ryan (1881–1975), Irish priest; archbishop of Port of Spain
- Patrick Ryan (Jesuit priest) (1939–2025), American academic

== Sports ==
- Paddy Ryan (1851–1900), Irish-American boxer
- Patrick Ryan (hammer thrower) (1881–1964), U.S. Olympic athlete and New York City police officer
- Patrick Ryan (wheelchair rugby) (born 1981), Australian Paralympic wheelchair rugby union player

== See also ==
- Pat Ryan (disambiguation)
- Paddy Ryan (disambiguation)
