= Direct negotiations between Chile and Argentina in 1977–1978 =

The direct negotiations between Chile and Argentina about the islands and maritime rights in Beagle conflict began after the Queen Elizabeth II of the United Kingdom announced on 2 May 1977 the judgement of the Beagle Channel Arbitration to the governments of both countries. The court ruled that the islands and all adjacent formations belonged to Chile. The direct negotiations finished with the Act of Montevideo on 9 January 1979, where both countries accept the papal mediation after Argentina's call off of the Operation Soberanía. This was the most dangerous phase of the Beagle Conflict and there was a real possibility of open warfare.

== Internal politics of both countries ==
Argentina and Chile were both ruled by military governments at the time of the negotiations. The Chilean and Argentine governments shared common interests: internal war against subversion, annihilating the opposition; external war against communism, remaining nonetheless part of the non-aligned movement; modernisation and liberalisation of the economy; a conservative approach towards social and class relations. By the end of 1977, the war against subversion and opposition was substantially over in both countries, as the Operation Condor had lost momentum and détente had improved East-West relations. The two countries maintained good economic relations. But in 1977, the conflict over the Beagle Channel had become the primary foreign policy imperative of both governments.

In 1976, the United States imposed an arms embargo on Chile through the Kennedy Amendment, which was also applied to Argentina in 1978; to counter this, Pinochet tasked Carlos Cardoen with assembling weapons, inventing cluster bombs and motorcycles equipped with four anti-tank rockets, and also turning to the black market.

=== Chile ===
There was considerable international condemnation of the Chilean Military Regime's human rights record. President Augusto Pinochet enjoyed absolute authority and was largely unaccountable to other elements within the military, the Beagle conflict was a less significant issue and there was a highly unusual dialogue on the subject with the opposition. Eduardo Frei Montalva, leader of the Opposition, backed the policy of the government in this matter:

"They, not Chile, are feeding a conflict of dramatic consequences".

The most important negotiation goal of the Chilean government was to negotiate the maritime boundary without land loss.

=== Argentina ===
Despite the many violations of human rights in Argentina the junta enjoyed abroad good regards and the human rights commission of the United Nations didn't condemn the Argentine Junta, until 1981. In 1978 the World Cup Final was held in Argentina and their team won the FIFA World Cup. The Argentine President Jorge Rafael Videla was considered by journalists at the beginning of its government with sympathy:

"The dictator was described as correctly, politely, puritan in excess, deeply catholic and one showed understanding"

In Argentina, the consequences of the dispute for internal politics were more significant. The conflict became a keyword for the extreme nationalist elements within the military junta that controlled the country until 1983. Among many junta members, a conciliatory approach to Chile came to be regarded as a sign of weakness, giving the dispute far-reaching ramifications at the highest levels of Argentine politics. This ultimately produced an environment in which relatively moderate decision makers assumed a more aggressive posture due to the fear of removal.

The Argentine Historian Luis Alberto Romero wrote about the Argentine Government:

«By that time, a bellicose current of opinion had arisen among the military and its friend, an attitude rooted in a strain of Argentine nationalism, which drew substance from strong chauvinistic sentiments. Diverse ancient fantasies in society's historical imaginary – the "patria grande", the "spoliation" that the country had suffered – where added to a new fantasy of "entering the first world" through a "strong" foreign policy. All this combined with the traditional messianic military mentality and the ingenuousness of its strategies which were ignorant of the most elemental facts of international politics. The aggression against Chile, stymied by papal mediation, was transferred to Great Britain …»

Similar arguments appeared in "The New York Times on 31 December 1978":

«Beagle Channel controversy that has brought the military regimes of Argentina and Chile to the brink of war is an expression of the turbulent revisionism underway in Argentina in reaction to frustrations in national life. Argentine policy is made by military men whose nationalist values are mixed with personal ambitions, phobias against politicians, "progressive" …»

During the crisis the Argentine Government was divided in two groups, hardliners, which pressured for drastic military actions and softliners that struggled to maintain bilateral negotiations.

== The Argentine Challenge ==
Argentina took steps to increment the pressure upon Chile:

1. in October 1978 the presidents of Bolivia and Argentina signed a demand for a Bolivian sea entrance, the Argentine Claims over the Falkland Islands and the Argentine Claims in the Beagle conflict.
2. the Argentine Armed Forces planned the Operation Soberanía, to occupy the islands, wait for the Chilean Reaction and then reply.
3. Mobilization orders were issued, the navy sailed southwards and the army was deployed to the border.
4. 4000 Chilean Citizens were expelled from Argentina.
5. Blackout drills were conducted in various cities, even if the cities were unreachable for the overaged Chilean Air Force
6. abject warmongering:

General Luciano Menendez, Chief Commander of the III Argentine Army Corps:

«If [our government] let us attack the Chileans, we will chase her away up to Easter Island, we will celebrate the New Year's Eve in La Moneda and afterwards we will go for a Champagne-slash to the pacific beach»

An Argentine Officer:

«We will cross the Andes, we will eat the chickens and rape the women»

1. the Argentine Borderpolice (Gendarmería) closed the border to Chile several times, a step regarded as preliminary stage to the war
2. Jorge Videla, President of Argentina threatened war if Chile didn't accept the Argentine Conditions: «Las negociaciones directas constituyen la única vía pacífica para solucionar el conflicto» (Translation: «Direct Negotiations are the only peaceful way out to resolve the conflict»)

== The Chilean Reaction ==
Chile held the islands de facto at least since 1881 and de jure after the judgement. The Chilean newspaper El Mercurio annotated about the pre-war disposition

«In difference to Chile, where the preparation of war was inconspicuous in order not to alarm the population, the Argentines mobilized amidst loud demonstrations…».

The Ambassador of the United States of America in Buenos Aires in 1978, Raúl Héctor Castro, described in similar words the situation in Chile:

M. Aizenk: Did you exert the same pressure in Santiago as in Buenos Aires?
R.Castro: No, I found a calmer atmosphere among the Chileans. There was not the resoluteness to cross the border immediately. I didn't see any thing like that in the Chilean Army

== The meetings ==
About the issues of the negotiations see Interests of the Parties

One day after the announcement of the award on 2 May 1977, the Argentine Minister of Foreign Affairs foreshadowed a possible refusal: «…no commitment obliges a country to comply with that which affects its vital interests or that which damages rights of sovereignty…».

Frenzied diplomatic activity occurred alongside the military preparations.

On 5 May 1977 the Argentine Government sent to Chile the Chief of Staff (jefe del Estado Mayor Conjunto), Admiral Julio Torti with the proposal for direct discussions regarding the consequences of the arbitral award, particularly the maritime border.

This overture eventually led to two rounds of discussions, held from July 5 to 8 1977 in Buenos Aires and October 17 to 20 1977 in Santiago de Chile.

On 14 June 1977 the Chilean Government issued the decree n°416 over the baselines (See Chilean Baselines Map) complicating the situation still further.

=== Torti's proposal ===
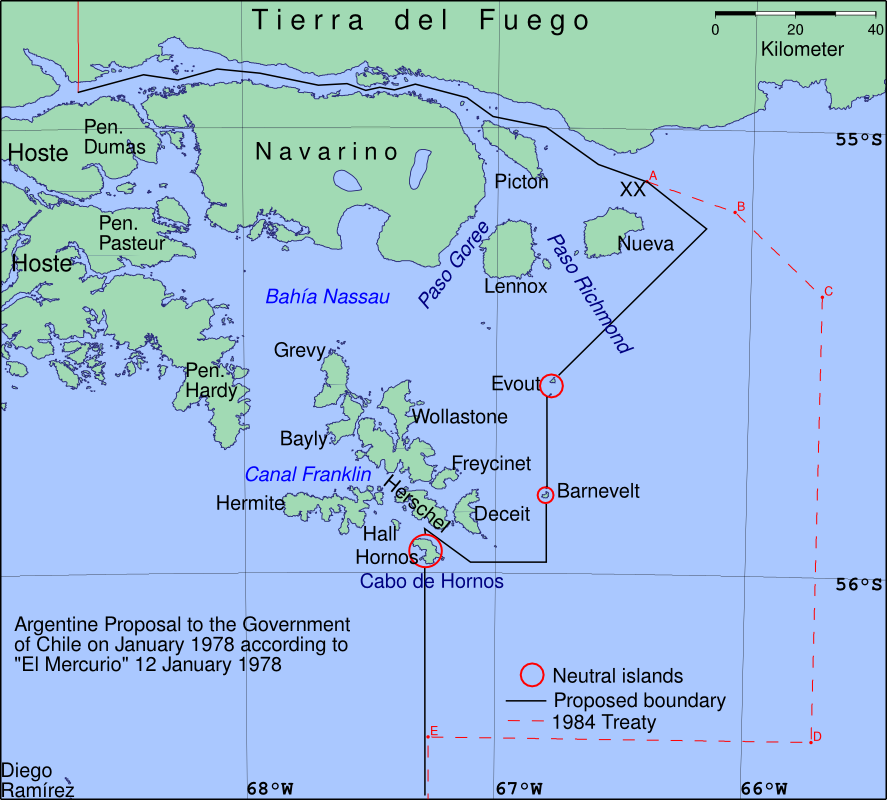
Torti's proposal: Evouts, Barnevelt and Hornos became condominium territories

On 5 December 1977 Admiral Torti returned to Santiago with a new proposal. The new proposal conceded the Picton, Nueva and Lennox Islands group to Chile, but it called for joint ownership of three other islands to the south that Chile considered unequivocally Chilean: Evout, Barnevelt, and Cape Horn Island. The Torti proposal also provided for a maritime boundary that would extend south for 200 miles along a meridian passing through Cape Horn.

The new proposal extended the problem beyond of the "Hammer" (ABCDEF) to all islands south from the Tierra del Fuego as far as Cape Hoorn.

In December 1977 met the Ministers of Foreign Affairs Patricio Carvajal of Chile and Oscar Antonio Montes of Argentina. Both meetings were unsuccessful.

On 10 January 1978 Chile invited Argentina to submit the dispute to the International Court of Justice. But Argentina, dissatisfied with the ruling, did not pursue further juridical proceedings.

=== In Mendoza ===
The Argentine and Chilean presidents met in Mendoza on 19 January 1978 and they agreed to meet again in March in a definitive attempt to reach a settlement through direct negotiation.

On 25 January 1978 Argentina repudiated the binding Arbitral Award. On 26 January 1978 Chile declared the Award binding and unappealable.

=== In Puerto Montt ===
On 20 February 1978 Argentine and Chilean presidents signed the Act of Puerto Montt establishing a formal structure for further direct negotiations. Negotiations held in accordance with the Act of Puerto Montt were, however, unsuccessful.

On 20 November 1978 Chile proposed again to submit to the International Court in The Hague as provided by a 1972 treaty and was unofficially informed that Argentina would consider that option as a Casus belli, but a mediation was accepted by the Junta.

The two foreign ministers met on December 12 in Buenos Aires to decide who would be asked to mediate. The candidates were the President of the United States of America Jimmy Carter, the King Juan Carlos of Spain, a European President and the Pope. Both minister asserted that the only acceptable candidate was the Pope, but in the evening the Chilean Minister received a phone call to inform him that the Argentine Junta hadn't authorized the signing of the mediation agreement.

The failure of the December 12, 1978 meeting convinced many decision makers in both Chile and Argentina that war was both inevitable and imminent.

On December 14, 1978, in a meeting the Comite Militar, formed by the president, the three members of the Junta, the secretaries of the three armed forces and two more members both from the army's staff, (President Videla and the Foreign Minister were not invited) decided on military action: the Operation Soberanía should begin on 22 December 1978.

== Aftermath ==
The Chilean Armed Forces were not able to impose by presence the Arbitral Award of 1977. Pinochet's regime could not prevent through international pressure the Argentine Declaration of nullity. It was one of the largest defeats of the Chilean dictatorship on international terrain.

The Argentine Regime encumbered a problem for years that they could not resolve. Neither through the threat of war nor through negotiations could Chile be moved to change the (land) border that was defined by the Arbitral Award.

The military tension at the border persisted until the Falklands War, and is often supposed to be the reason for Chilean Support to the United Kingdom during the war.

After the return to democracy in Argentina, Chile accepted shifting the maritime Border to the west.

== See also ==
- Falklands War
- Argentina-Chile relations
- Foreign relations of Argentina
- Foreign relations of Chile
- Dispute over the extended continental shelf in the Southern Sea between Argentina and Chile
