= Pat Ryan =

Pat Ryan may refer to:

== Sportspeople ==
=== Hurlers ===
- Pat Ryan (Borris–Ileigh hurler) (born 1958), Irish hurler for Tipperary
- Pat Ryan (Cork hurler) (born 1976), Irish hurler
- Pat Ryan (Limerick hurler) (born 1995), Irish hurler
- Pat Ryan (Moycarkey–Borris hurler) (born 1938), Irish hurler for Tipperary

=== Other sports ===
- Patrick Ryan (hammer thrower) (1881–1964), first holder of the World Hammer Record
- Pat Ryan (American football) (born 1955), American football quarterback
- Pat Ryan (Australian footballer) (1886–1937), Australian rules footballer
- Pat Ryan (boxer) (1952–2013), New Zealand boxer
- Pat Ryan (curler) (born 1955), Canadian curler
- Pat Ryan (rugby union) (1950–1985), New Zealand rugby union player

== Other people ==
- Pat Ryan (artist), American poster artist
- Pat Ryan, maiden name of Pat Nixon (1912–1993), First Lady of the United States
- Pat Ryan (executive) (born 1937/38), founder and executive chairman of Aon Corporation
- R. L. Ryan (1946–1991), American actor, sometimes billed as Pat Ryan
- Pat Ryan (politician) (born 1982), American politician
- Pat Ryan, fictional journalist and man of action in the comic strip Terry and the Pirates (1934–1973)

== See also ==
- Patrick Ryan (disambiguation)
- Patricia Ryan (disambiguation)
