= Patrick J. Ryan (lieutenant colonel) =

United States Marine Corps lieutenant colonel

- Born: January 1, 1931; North Arlington, New Jersey, U.S.
- Died: February 13, 2013 (aged 82); Oceanside, California, U.S.
- Military career
- Allegiance: United States
- Branch: United States Marine Corps
- Service years: 1953–1982
- Rank: Lieutenant colonel
- Conflicts: Vietnam War
- Awards: Bronze Star Medal; Legion of Merit

Signature
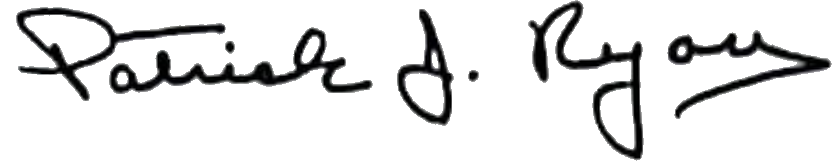

Patrick J. Ryan (January 1, 1931 – February 13, 2013) was a United States Marine Corps lieutenant colonel, intelligence officer, lawyer, and author. A career Marine officer, he served in reconnaissance and special operations units, including the 1st Force Reconnaissance Company, and later became known for his military service in Chile during the period surrounding the 1973 Chilean coup d'état. After retiring from the Marine Corps, he became an attorney and served for more than two decades as honorary Chilean consul in San Diego.

== Early life and education ==
Ryan was born on January 1, 1931, in North Arlington, New Jersey. He attended College of the Holy Cross on a football scholarship, graduating with a degree in economics in 1953. During his early years, he was a successful athlete and briefly pursued a professional football career before returning to military service.

== Military career ==
Ryan joined the United States Marine Corps in 1953. He later attended Officer Candidates School and received a commission as a second lieutenant. After a brief period in the Marine Corps Reserve, he signed as a free agent with the Green Bay Packers and was later traded to the New York Giants. He eventually decided to leave professional football and continue his career as a Marine officer, where he was an early pioneer in the Marine Corps reconnaissance field and also developed the skills of being a parachtist and Scuba diver. In 1969 he graduated from the Armed Forces Staff College in 1969.

Despite having limited vision in one eye, Ryan continued his military career and became involved in reconnaissance and special operations, serving in varied assignments as a commanding officer. He served in Korea, Vietnam, and South America. His military decorations included the Bronze Star Medal, the Joint Service Commendation Medal, the Army Commendation Medal, and the Legion of Merit.

== Service in Chile ==
Chile's coup d'état was close to perfect [...]

— Situation Report #2 of the U.S. military group in Valparaíso, written by U.S. Naval Intelligence Office Marine Lt. Col. Patrick J. Ryan

During his assignment as deputy chief of the United States Military Group in Chile (December 1972 - April 1976), Ryan was stationed in the country during the political crisis that culminated in the overthrow of President Salvador Allende on September 11, 1973. According to accounts of his military career, he received the Legion of Merit for his service in that position.

Ryan later became associated with discussions regarding United States activities in Chile before the coup. In accounts related to the death of American journalist Charles Horman, Ryan was identified as one of the United States military officials whom Horman and journalist Terri Simon encountered while seeking information about the political situation after the military takeover. These events later became the subject of Thomas Hauser's book The Execution of Charles Horman: An American Sacrifice and the film Missing directed by Costa-Gavras. He is described as "a bloodthirsty anticommunist" after failures in Vietnam.

General Carlos Prats mentions Ryan in an interview with the The Times of London:

It was there in Valparaíso where the officers involved in the conspiracy secretly met with a U.S. Marine Corps officer, the same one who would later maintain contacts with Admiral José Toribio Merino, Commander-in-Chief of the Navy in Valparaíso and member of the Southern Pacific Nautical Brotherhood, a foundational body of the coup. That man was Lieutenant Colonel Patrick Ryan of the Office of Naval Intelligence.

— General Carlos Prats in The Times of London.

Ryan replied:

Of personal interest to the author was a London Times article (27/10/73) written by Godfrey Hodgson and William Shawcross, which stated that, "in planning for the coup d'etat, Admiral Jose Toribio Merino maintained close personal liaison with Lieutenant Colonel Patrick J. Ryan, USMC of the U.S. Navy Mission in Valparaiso, Chile". Although I found the London Times reporting of my daily and personal liaison with Admiral Merino most flattering, I also found it completely untrue! During the eight months in Chile preceding the coup, my desk calendar reveals only two appointments with Admiral Merino, and they dealt with strictly mundane matters. These appoinments were typical vice admiral lieutenant colonel contacts. He talked, I listened and then carried out his orders. The London Times' report of my liaison duties with Merino in connection with the coup was absolutely false and typified the misinformation and fabricated "facts" that were disseminated to the world regarding the coup in Chile.

Ryan's own interpretation of Chile's political crisis was presented in his book Allende's Chile: 1000 Bungled Days, published in 1976. The work criticized Salvador Allende's government and argued that its policies contributed to Chile's political and economic instability as well as rejecting the Kennedy Amendment, stating:

For ten years the United States fought communism in Vietnam, 7000 miles from California, at a tragic loss of 55,000 American lives, six times as many wounded, not to mention a staggering cost of 150 billion dollars. The Vietnam debacle, authored and orchestrated by a decade of politicians in Washington to the ludicrous battle cry of "measured response" strained our national unity as no other event in our history since the Civil War. What did we accomplish at this horrendous price? We lost the war! On the other hand, the Republic of Chile, situated in our hemisphere, fought communism here in America's Backyard, without the aid of B-52's, the 7th Fleet, or even a Bob Hope visit. No American fingers squeezed M-16 triggers, no gruesome parade of American flag draped caskets were airlifted daily from Santiago, Chile, to gravesites in the United States of America. What's more, without our aid, and unencumbered by our tactic of "measured response" the Chileans defeated communism! The United States government not only has not acclaimed Chile's outright defeat of communism, but incredibly, our Senate and Congress, via the Kennedy Amendment to the Foreign Assistance Act, have terminated all military aid to the new anti-communist government of Chile. Why?

— Lieutenant Colonel Patrick J. Ryan, 1976.

== Later life ==
After retiring from active military service in 1982 with the rank of lieutenant colonel, Ryan continued his studies and obtained degrees in international relations and law. He worked as a criminal defense attorney in California from 1987 until 2006.

Ryan also maintained close relations with Chile, serving as honorary consul of Chile in San Diego for more than twenty years. He was involved in veterans' organizations and founded the Force Recon Association, an organization dedicated to former and active reconnaissance Marines.

== Death ==
Patrick J. Ryan died on February 13, 2013, in Oceanside, California, at the age of 82. He was survived by his wife Terry Ryan, his children, grandchildren, and brother Rory Ryan. His funeral was held at St. Elizabeth Seton Catholic Church in Carlsbad, California, and burial was planned at Arlington National Cemetery.

== Publications ==
- Allende's Chile: 1000 Bungled Days, American Chilean Council, New York, 1976, 21 pages.
- El Chile de Allende y los Mil Días Perdidos, 1976.
