= Paddy Ryan (disambiguation) =

Paddy Ryan (1851–1900) was an Irish-American boxer and world heavyweight champion.

Paddy Ryan may also refer to:

- Paddy Ryan (actor) (1911–1990), British TV and film stuntman; see Undercover Girl (1958 film)
- Paddy Ryan (hurler) (1912–1991), Irish hurler
- Patrick Ryan (hammer thrower) (1881–1964), Irish-American hammer thrower
- Paddy Ryan (rugby union, born 1988), Australian rugby union player
- Paddy Ryan (rugby union, born 1990), Irish-American rugby union prop
- Paddy Ryan (rugby union, born 1998) Irish-American rugby union flanker
- Earl Patrick Freeman (1932–1989), Canadian professional wrestler, best known by the ring name Paddy Ryan
- Patrick Joseph Ryan (1904–1969), Australian Catholic priest, nicknamed "Paddy"
- Patrick D. Ryan, Irish mayor

== See also ==
- Patrick Ryan (disambiguation)
