= Patricia Ryan =

Patricia Ryan may refer to:

- Pat Nixon (1912–1993), née Patricia Ryan, wife of U.S. president Richard Nixon
- Patricia Ryan (CFF), former director of the Cult Awareness Network, daughter of former U.S. Congressman Leo Ryan
- Patricia Ryan (author) (born 1954), American writer
- Patricia Ryan (actress) (1921–1949), British-born American active in old-time radio from childhood until her death at age 27
- Patricia Ryan (equestrian) (born 1973), Irish equestrian
- Patricia E. Ryan, American human rights advocate and women's rights lobbyist
- Patricia Ryan (judge), Irish judge
- Patricia Ryan (politician), Irish politician for Kildare South

== See also ==
- Patty Ryan (1961–2023), German singer
- Pat Ryan (disambiguation)
