= Godfrey Hodgson =

English journalist and historian (1934–2021)

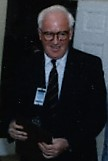
- Hodgson in 1988
- Born: 1 February 1934; Horsham, England
- Died: 27 January 2021 (aged 86)
- Education: University of Oxford; University of Pennsylvania
- Occupations: Journalist and historian
- Notable work: America in Our Time: From World War II to Nixon; American Melodrama; The Myth of American Exceptionalism; World Turned Right Side Up
- Spouses: Alice Vidal (m. 1958; div. 1969) Hilary Lamb (m. 1970; died 2016)

Godfrey Hodgson (1 February 1934 – 27 January 2021) was an English journalist and historian who covered and studied American politics and civil society. As a journalist he worked across television and print, working for organizations including The Times, The Observer, Sunday Times, ITV, and Channel 4 News. As an author, he wrote extensively on American society, politics, and values in books including American Melodrama (1969), America in Our Time: From World War II to Nixon (1976), World Turned Right Side Up (1996) and More Equal Than Others (2004). Through his work he covered America from the 1960s through the 2000s, spanning the civil rights movement, establishment of the liberal consensus, and the rising global and domestic conservatism. He had degrees from University of Oxford and University of Pennsylvania.

== Early life ==
Hodgson was born on 1 February 1934 to Jessica (née Hill) and Arthur Hodgson in Horsham in modern day West Sussex. His father was a headteacher at the Archbishop Holgate's School in North Yorkshire, where the family moved to when he was three. His mother suffered multiple sclerosis when he was young, and he contracted osteomyelitis at the age of two leaving him with a disfigured arm. At nine, he was sent to Dragon School in Oxford to keep him away from his mother's illness. His mother died in 1947, when he was 13.

Hodgson won scholarships to Winchester College and Magdalen College, Oxford, and achieved a first in history in 1954. He completed his masters from University of Pennsylvania on a scholarship and wrote his thesis on the English civil war.

== Career ==
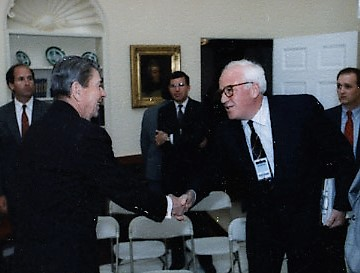
Hodgson (right) shaking hands with US President Ronald Reagan in the White House in 1988

Hodgson began his career in the UK as a journalist with The Times and later joined The Observer in 1960 as a columnist. In 1962, he was appointed The Observer's foreign correspondent in Washington, D.C., a position that he served through 1965. During this time in the United States, Hodgson covered several events including the civil rights movement, protests in the universities, the Cuban Missile Crisis, Martin Luther King Jr.'s I Have a Dream speech, the assassination of John F. Kennedy, and the presidency of Lyndon B. Johnson.

After his stint with The Observer in Washington, Hodgson returned to London, and entered television broadcasting to join the television network ITV as a reporter for the TV program This Week between 1965 and 1967, and later with The Sunday Times from 1967 through 1971. He went on to anchor London Weekend Television's London Programme between 1976 and 1981. He was one of the co-founders of Channel 4 News in 1982 and served as a presenter until 1985.

Hodgson was involved in academic pursuits including serving as the director of the Reuters Foundation between 1992 and 2001. He also received a fellowship at the Green Templeton College, Oxford, where he taught graduate studies. He set up the Laurence Stern fellowship with journalist Ben Bradlee from The Washington Post in 1980 for young British journalists to work at the Post and cover American stories.

In his works, Hodgson covered American society, politics, and values. Through his career, he worked and reported from 48 out of the 50 states of the United States. His book America in Our Time: From World War II to Nixon (1976), considered a landmark study by historians, spanned the period from after the Second World War through Nixon's presidency and documented America's rise of liberal values. He coined the phrase "liberal consensus" to describe the liberal values accepted across the political divide, and accompanied by aggressive foreign policy to defeat communism abroad, and domestic abundance enabled by free enterprise. In his later years, and in books including World Turned Right Side Up (1996) and More Equal Than Others (2004), he explained the forces behind the rise of global and domestic conservatism. He went on to dispel several myths about the society, including the central theme in the provocatively titled The Myth of American Exceptionalism (2009). His 2007 book A Great and Godly Adventure dispelled certain notions around Thanksgiving, including showing that the first Thanksgiving did not include cranberry sauce and turkey.

== Personal life ==
Hodgson married Alice Vidal in 1958. The couple had two sons before divorcing in 1969. He married Hilary Lamb in 1970 and the couple had two daughters. Lamb died in 2016.

Hodgson died on 27 January 2021, aged 86.

== Books ==
- All Things to All Men: The False Promise of the Modern American Presidency. Simon and Schuster. 1981. ISBN 978-0-671-43165-5.
- People's Century, 20th: From the Dawn of the Century to the Start of the Cold War. BBC Books. 1995. ISBN 978-0-563-37024-6.
- A New Grand Tour: How Europe's Great Cities Made Our World. Viking. 1995. ISBN 978-0-670-83369-6.
- The World Turned Right Side Up. Perseus Books Group. 1996. ISBN 978-0-465-09253-6.
- The World Turned Rightside Up. Houghton Mifflin. 1996. ISBN 978-0-395-82293-7.
- America in Our Time: From World War II to Nixon--what Happened and why. Princeton University Press. 2005. ISBN 978-0-691-12288-5.
- Woodrow Wilson's Right Hand: The Life of Colonel Edward M. House. Yale University Press. 2006. ISBN 978-0-300-09269-1.
- A Great and Godly Adventure. PublicAffairs. 2007. ISBN 978-1-58648-504-7.
- Sweet Evenlode. The Wychwood Press. 2007. ISBN 978-1902279312.
- The Myth of American Exceptionalism. Yale University Press. 2009. ISBN 978-0-300-14268-6.
- More Equal Than Others: America from Nixon to the New Century. Princeton University Press. 2009. ISBN 978-1-4008-2595-0.
- Martin Luther King. Quercus Publishing. 2011. ISBN 978-1-84916-809-0.
- JFK and LBJ: The Last Two Great Presidents. Yale University Press. 2015. ISBN 978-0-300-18242-2.
- Martin Luther King. Hodder. 2016. ISBN 978-1-84916-262-3.
- The Colonel: The Life and Wars of Henry Stimson, 1867-1950. Plunkett Lake Press. 2020.
