= 1989 Chilean grape scare =

Food safety scare

In March 1989, terrorists claimed to have poisoned fruit shipments from Chile to the United States, a claim seemingly supported by the discovery of two cyanide-laced grapes from Chile in Philadelphia, PA. The resulting disruption to food trade severely damaged the Chilean economy.

== Initial threats ==
On March 2, 1989, the United States embassy in Santiago, Chile received an anonymous phone call claiming that Chilean fruit shipments headed toward the U.S. had been poisoned with the toxin cyanide. The Japanese embassy also received a similar phone call. However the caller did not include information about what fruit had been poisoned or what container it was shipped in. That same day the United States Custom Service ordered that all Chilean fruit not be sent to the public.

Chile at the time was experiencing substantial political instability following a national plebiscite on the Pinochet dictatorship. The military government, without evidence, blamed local Marxist extremists for the call.

Authorities concluded that the threat was not credible on March 6, and began releasing the fruit.

On March 7, the US Food and Drug Administration (FDA) began investigating the cyanide threats, and, the next day, they received yet another threat about the poisoned fruit. In response the FDA started more thorough inspections of all incoming produce.

== Temporary recall ==
On March 12, inspectors found two grapes that tested positive for cyanide under the cyantesmo test, and then quantified the amount with chloramine-T. There was little cyanide present: 0.51 ppm, not enough to cause sickness in a small child.

The origin of the cyanide detected on March 12 remains in dispute, because the natural sugars and organic acids found in fruit such as grapes can react with and break down cyanide. Chile argues that any cyanide applied before shipment could not have survived the trip to the US, and instead proposed an American political conspiracy (see § Economic and political impact). Alternatively, then-standard fumigants contained cyanide.

Although the amount of cyanide found was minimal, the FDA started a full investigation. The American Produce Association estimated that two million cases of fruit were pulled from shelves in the United States. The import suspension on fruit lasted a total of five days before the FDA and Chile came to an agreement. This agreement was that all Chilean produce needed to pass an inspection in order to be put onto the shelves.

Shortly after, on March 17, there was a third phone call threat, however there were no more contaminated fruit being found. By the middle of April the inspections of Chilean produce returned to normal.

== Economic-political impact ==
Table grapes are the leading Chilean agricultural export to the United States. The temporary pause caused significant distress in the Chilean fruit sector, with losses estimated at $200 million. Roughly 20,000 workers in the Chilean fruit sector lost their jobs at the time.

According to the US Government Accountability Office, approximately 47 million crates of fruit had already been exported before the suspension, out of an expected 103 million for the season. Shipments already on their way were delayed, and packing facilities suspended operations while inspections began. The Chilean government agreed to allow all fruit exports to be inspected before shipment.

Chile unsuccessfully attempted to sue the US for $330 million in damages, claiming that the delay constituted an unlawful non-tariff barrier to trade in favor of local California grape-growers.

The incident reportedly affected Chile's overall reputation internationally. Some foreign buyers and governments increased their inspection and regulations on Chilean produce following the event.
