= Carlos Cardoen =

Chilean metallurgical engineer and weapons scientist

Carlos Cardoen Cornejo
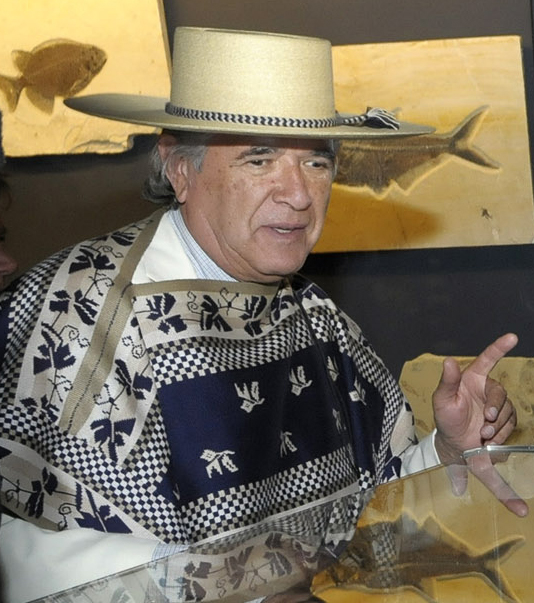
- Cardoen dressed as a huaso, in 2010
- Born: May 1, 1942 (age 84); Santa Cruz, Chile
- Education: University of Utah, U.S.
- Occupations: Agricultural and tourism businessman, arms manufacturer (formerly), metallurgical engineer.
- Known for: Arms manufacturing and supply of explosive weapons to Iraq.

Entrance to Colchagua Museum, owned by the Cardoen Foundation.

Carlos Remigio Cardoen Cornejo (born 1 May 1942, Santa Cruz, Chile) is a Chilean agricultural and tourism businessman, metallurgical engineer and former arms manufacturer.

Cardoen rose to prominence in the 1980s amidst the United States arms embargo against Chile, when he became "Pinochet's favourite arms manufacturer".

When Saddam Hussein fell out of favor with the United States in connection with the 1990 invasion of Kuwait, Cardoen, who had weapon dealings with Iraq, was accused by the US of zirconium trafficking. Since then he has been on the Interpol wanted list. On various occasions Cardoen has received support from National Congress and the Minister of Foreign Affairs to end the Interpol arrest warrant.

== Weapons industry ==
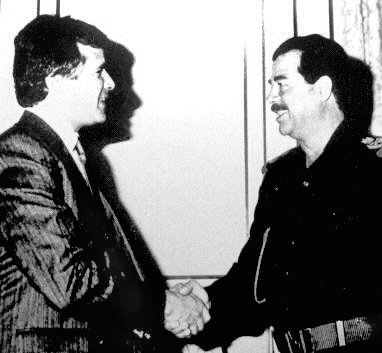
Carlos Cardoen meeting with former Iraqi President Saddam Hussein

As a weapons expert, he ran Industrias Cardoen in the late 1980s. He allegedly illegally sold zirconium-supplemented armaments to Iraq under Saddam Hussein, exported from the United States, for which he has an international arrest warrant. Yet, Cardoen claims the United States, which in the 1980s supported Hussein's Iraq in its war against Iran, was aware and implicitly consented to this trade until Saddam Hussein fell out of favour.

During the height of the Beagle crisis in 1978 Cardoen was contacted by Chilean Air Force commander and member of the Chilean junta, Fernando Matthei and designed on his request a light bomb, that could be dropped from any airforce plane, in only 15 days. When asking Matthei what did he want the bomb for, he reportedly answered: "para joder" ("to piss them off").

In the mid-1980 Cardoen bought the Italian swimmer delivery vehicle and minisub manufacturer Cos.Mo.S. His attempts to sell the firm under the table to Iraq ended in scandal and the closure of the company. A warrant was issued for his arrest, but he was never brought to justice.

Cardoen claims Iraq owes him US$50 million from weapon purchases.

== Agriculture and tourism ==
From the 1990s onwards Cardoen has invested capital into the wine, energy, match, fruit juice and tourism businesses in Chile, especially in O'Higgins, his home region. Due to his involvement in cultural and tourism projects he has been awarded the "Premio a lo Chileno" in 2006 and "Orden al Mérito Docente y Cultural Gabriela Mistral" in 2005. He has been suffering from colon cancer for many years.

== See also ==
- Iran-Contra
- Fábricas y Maestranzas del Ejército de Chile
