= America's Backyard =

Political and international relations concept

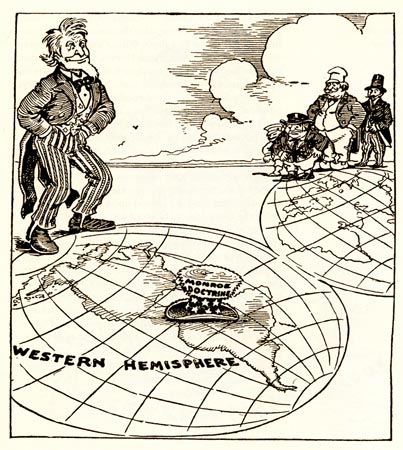
A 1912 newspaper cartoon highlighting the United States' influence in protecting neighboring countries in its "backyard" from European colonial expansion in the century following the Monroe Doctrine

America's backyard is a concept often used in political science and international relations contexts to refer to the sphere of influence of the United States and its traditional areas of dominance, especially Latin America.

It is somewhat analogous to the Russian concept of near abroad (Russian: ближнее зарубежье, romanized: blizhneye zarubezhye).

The term has recently been prominent in popular media with reference to threats to US national security (including Russian military exercises and Middle Eastern terrorism) used to contrast such threats at home with those on traditional fronts in Europe or the Middle East.

In a less geopolitical context, America's Backyard is also used on occasion to refer to national parks and public lands in the US, as well as the American heartland more generally.

== Terminology ==
Drawing on the use of the term backyard to refer to the surrounding area or neighborhood in which one resides, "America's backyard" has been referred to as the area within which the United States, as the "homeowner", has asserted some proprietary right or sought to limit outside influence. Conversely, "America's Backyard" is referred to the area within which actions by enemy or competing powers might be feared or seen as provocative. This has much in common with the Russian near abroad, used primarily in reference to the former Soviet Bloc countries; "near Abroad" signified that "Russia [claimed] rights in the region that transcend traditional diplomatic conventions".

=== Other uses of the term ===
There are other uses regarding public land and homeland security. National Geographic also uses the term 'America's Backyard' referring to the public lands of the United States. For instance, national parks, forests, wildlife refuges, urban parks, and urban gardens—US public lands. Included in this mix are greenways and river ways, as well as historic landmarks and landscapes. Public lands or 'America's Backyard' make up approximately one third of the United States.

The idea of America's backyard — a place of security and tranquility, unlike lines of conflict elsewhere — has been used in reference to middle America. For example, after the Oklahoma City bombing, Americans were outspoken with their shock that this attack took place in a "Middle-American" town rather than one of the United States' well-known political or economical cities or abroad. Many expressed surprise that such terrorism could happen in the very center of the United States, "deep in America's heartland." Furthermore, "America's Backyard" has appeared interchangeably with "heartland" in the writings of a variety of journalists, authors, war veterans and bloggers.

== History ==
The term "America's Backyard" originally referred to the United States' traditional area of dominance and major sphere of influence, which was Central and South America for a long time.

=== Monroe Doctrine ===
During the early 19th century, many Spanish colonies in Latin America were trying to take advantage of the failing Spanish empire and were trying to gain their independence from Spain. However, during the early 1820s, Spain was on the verge of restoration. The United States and Great Britain did not want Spain to gain any power back in Latin America because they wanted those colonies to become independent. Simon Bolivar was a leader in the fight for independence. With those colonies independent, they could trade in a mutually beneficial way with the United States and Great Britain and not be restricted by mercantilistic Spain which wanted to benefit its home economy at the expense of the South Americans. In light of all of this, President James Monroe proposed the Monroe Doctrine on December 2, 1823. The Doctrine stated that any further efforts by European countries to colonize land or interfere with states in the Americas would be viewed by the United States of America as acts of aggression requiring US intervention and asserted that the Western Hemisphere was not to be further colonized by European countries, and that the United States would not interfere with existing European colonies nor in the internal concerns of European countries. Since the United States at the time was not known as a powerful country, the Doctrine was not internationally taken seriously, however, since Great Britain agreed with it no countries challenged it.

The term "America's backyard" was then coined during this time as a reference to Latin America. The United States supported the Spanish colonies' independence because they wanted to keep Spain and other European countries out of the Western Hemisphere, out of "America's Backyard".

This manifested itself in the Louisiana Purchase (from France), Alaska Purchase (from Russia), 1812 War (against Britain), Spanish–American War, and the Big stick ideology.

=== Latin America as America's backyard ===
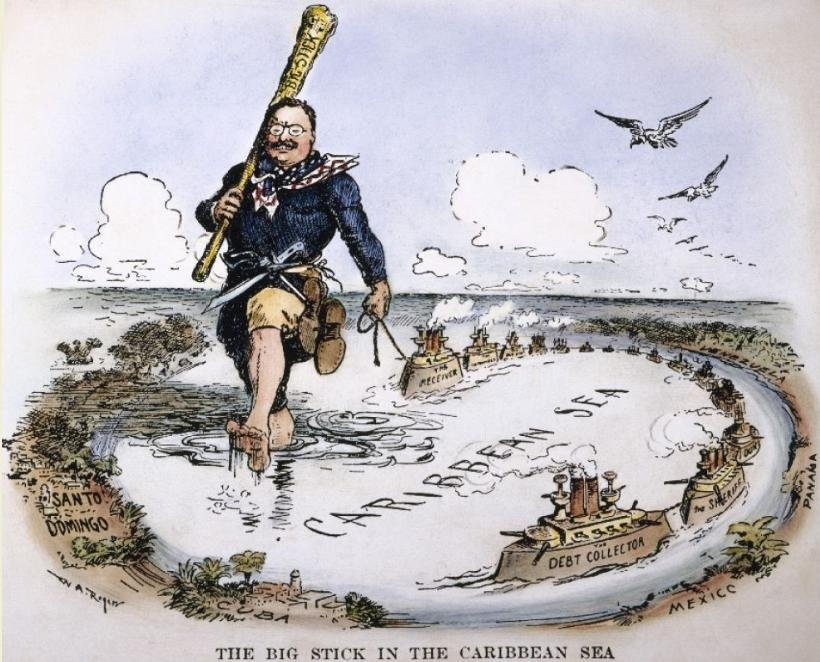
Theodore Roosevelt's Big Stick policy and bully pulpit tactics, asserting American dominance over the Caribbean region

Since the establishment of the United States, international relations have been politically important in securing the nation's developed democracy and influential power. With Latin America in closest proximity to the US, the neighboring continent has been labeled as “America’s Backyard.” In attempts to further economic development, the US government has exercised many strategies towards Latin America, especially over the past half century, including the Alliance for Progress.

The examination and analysis of relations between Latin America and the US over the course of history has increased in recent years. The declassification of official documents concerning Latin America by the Clinton administration allowed for more public information on the matter. In result, the public has been increasingly exposed to a much larger array of perspective and information on America's backyard and the United States’ role in Latin America.

Recent popular publications offer a more detailed insight into the development of relations between the United States and Latin America. The course of history leads to the overall inquiry of whether the US should be perceived as a good neighbor or a big bad wolf. Most popularized is Grace Livingstone's America’s Backyard: The United States and Latin America from the Monroe Doctrine to the War on Terror, which accounts the US strategy towards Latin America over the past half century, specifically revealing its intrinsic weaknesses and the profound ignorance and prejudice of US policymakers. Though Livingstone admits to a negative bias—one that focuses on the negative aspects of US policy towards Latin America at the expense of the positive efforts, such as the Alliance for Progress—she claims that the history needs to be exposed.

Though Latin America is not the poorest area in the world, it is the most unequal; historically a small elite has controlled most of the wealth. The US has traditionally dealt with that elite, however repressive or reactionary it has been, because they controlled the government and market economy. The masses of poor often were illiterate, non-Spanish speaking, and living on a subsistence economy. These later facts help explain the Latin America's uneven development. Livingstone expresses that even though in the US and Europe revolutionary upheaval or war has at times been the necessary precursor to change, the US government has acted as a counterweight to reform, regarding upheaval, mass protest (and of course revolution) as a threat to stability and therefore its own interests.

However the US' traditional role as the sole hegemonic power of the Americas has been challenged / limited by Cuba during the Cold War (Cuban Missile Crisis, Fidel Castro); as well as the more recent Venezuela crisis.

A 2025 tweet from Pete Hegseth announcing Operation Southern Spear stated "The Western Hemisphere is America's neighborhood – and we will protect it."

=== The Middle East as a new American backyard ===
A number of European commentators have contended that US foreign policy in the Middle East during the late 20th and early 21st century has (intentionally or otherwise) had the effect of turning the Middle East into America's new "backyard": a new epicenter within which the US is trying to exhort influence on political developments through regime change and political pressure which resembles past US actions in Latin America. This is exemplified by the US' pursuit of the war on terror in the region with its involvement in localized conflicts such as the Syrian civil war and the War against the Islamic State and its major military actions in pursuit of regime or territorial change during the Gulf War, War in Afghanistan, and Iraq War.

Martin Jacques refers to the Middle East as being under the US 'sphere of influence'. However this is being challenged by the presence and growth of other global powers including Russia and China as well as the Iranian-led axis of resistance, a disparate grouping of actors in the region committed to protect against the growing influence of America (and its ally Israel).

== Other nations' backyards ==
Both "backyard" and "near abroad" are increasingly used to refer to the immediate spheres of influence of other major powers, such as China and India.

=== China ===
China's backyard has traditionally been Southeast Asia, but recently is beginning to expand into Russia's old near abroad Central Asia and even parts of South Asia with infrastructure projects in places like Kazakhstan, Iran, and Pakistan. There were times when Central Asia was also under the Chinese sphere of influence, especially during the Han dynasty (Protectorate of the Western Regions, Han-Dayuan war) and Tang dynasty (Anxi Protectorate).

=== France ===
France maintains a relationship with its former African colonies that are considered to be the nation's pré carré (backyard). This is part of the ideology popularly known as Françafrique.

== See also ==
- Roosevelt Corollary
- Banana Wars
- Good Neighbor Policy
- Operation Condor
- Dollar diplomacy
- Latin America–United States relations
- South American Long Peace
