= 1973 Chilean coup d'état =

Overthrow of President Salvador Allende

- Part of the Cold War in South America
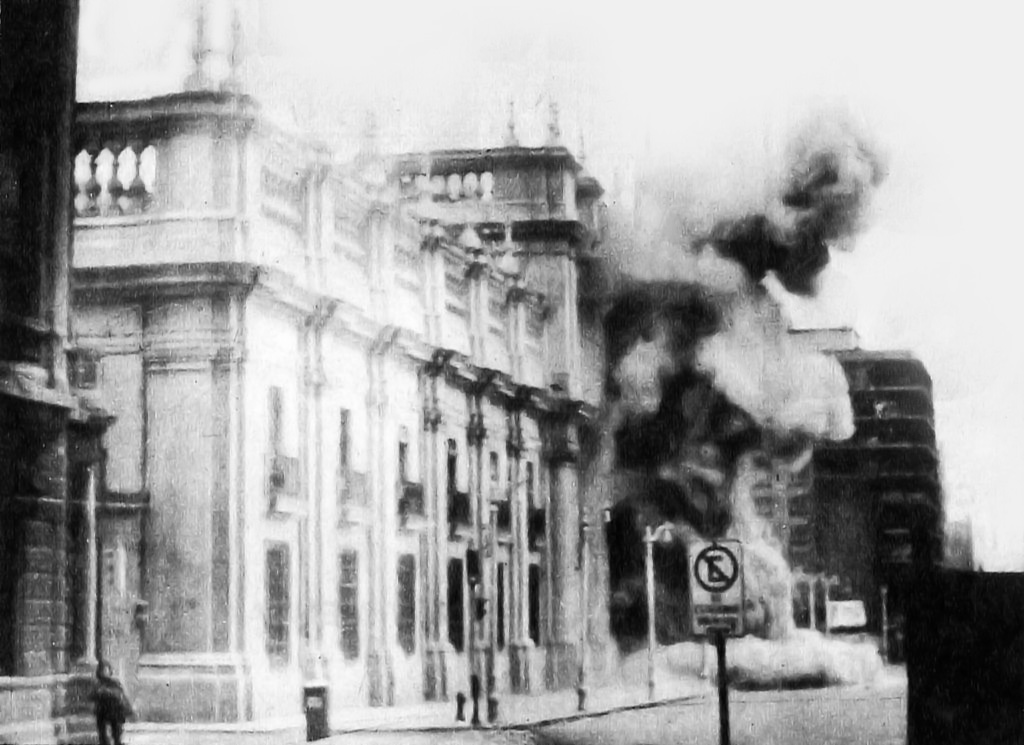
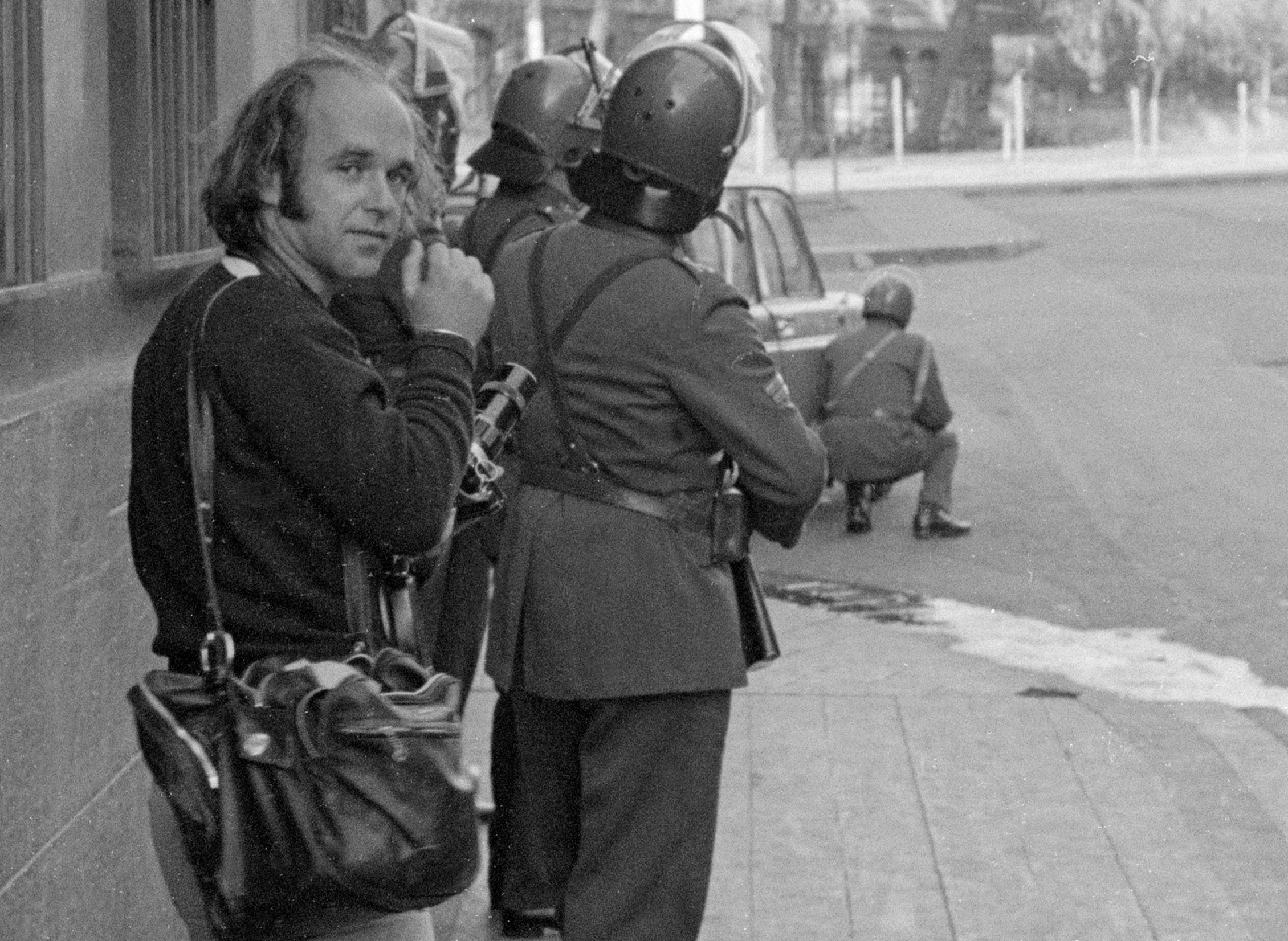
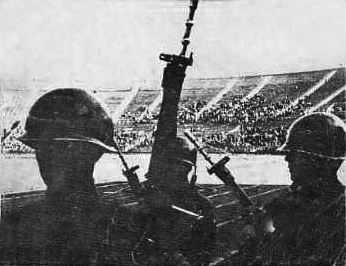
- From top to bottom: the bombing of La Moneda on 11 September 1973, by the Chilean Armed Forces; a journalist and policemen during the coup; and detainees and torture victims being detained at the National Stadium
Date	11 September 1973
Location	Chile
Action	Armed forces put the country under military control. Minor unorganized civil resistance
Result	Coup successful; Popular Unity government overthrown; Death of Salvador Allende; Military Junta Government led by General Augusto Pinochet assumed power; Beginning of the armed resistance

Belligerents
Government of Chile; Popular Unity; GAP; Revolutionary Left Movement; Other working-class militants; Indirect support by: Cuba; Soviet Union	Chilean Armed Forces; Chilean Army; Chilean Navy; Chilean Air Force; Carabineros de Chile; Indirect support by: Nationals; Christian Democrats (parts); Radical Democrats; United States; Brazil; Canada; Australia; United Kingdom

Commanders and leaders
Salvador Allende ‡‡; Max Marambio; Miguel Enríquez; Indirect support by: Fidel Castro; Leonid Brezhnev	Augusto Pinochet; José Merino; Gustavo Leigh; César Mendoza; Indirect support by: Richard Nixon; Henry Kissinger

Casualties and losses
46 GAP killed	34 killed

The 1973 Chilean coup d'état (Spanish: Golpe de Estado en Chile de 1973) was a military overthrow of the socialist president of Chile Salvador Allende and his Popular Unity coalition government. Allende, who was the first Marxist to be democratically elected president in a Latin American liberal democracy, faced significant social unrest and political tension with the opposition-controlled National Congress of Chile. On 11 September 1973, a group of military officers, led by General Augusto Pinochet, seized power in a coup, ending civilian rule.

During the air raids and ground attacks preceding the coup, Allende delivered his final speech, expressing his determination to remain at Palacio de La Moneda and rejecting offers of safe passage for exile. He died in the palace. The exact circumstances of Allende's death are still disputed, but it is generally accepted as a suicide. Following the coup, a military junta was established and it suspended all political activities in Chile and suppressed left-wing movements, such as the Communist Party of Chile and the Socialist Party of Chile, the Revolutionary Left Movement (MIR), and other communist and socialist parties. Pinochet swiftly consolidated power and was officially declared president of Chile in late 1974.

The Nixon administration, which had played a role in creating favorable conditions for the coup, promptly recognized the junta government and supported its efforts to consolidate power. In 2023, declassified documents showed that Nixon, Henry Kissinger, and the United States government, which had described Allende as a dangerous communist, were aware of the military's plans to overthrow Allende in the days before the coup d'état. According to historian Sebastián Hurtado Torres, there is no documentary evidence to support that the United States government acted actively in the coordination and execution of the coup actions by the Chilean Armed Forces. However, Richard Nixon's interest from the beginning was that the Allende government would not be consolidated. Historian Peter Winn found extensive evidence of United States complicity in events that helped in part to create the conditions that led to the coup.

Fidel Castro's Cuba was allied with the Allende Government, providing weapons to Left-Wing groups in Chile and Cuban officials tried to convince Allende to make a coup before the opposition made one. Castro visited Chile in 1971 staying for 24 days, more than initially expected. The KGB considered Allende a "confidential contact" according to the Mitrokhin Archive.

Chile had previously been regarded as a symbol of democracy and political stability in South America, while other countries in the region suffered under military juntas and caudillismo. The period in Chile before the coup is known as the Presidential Republic (1925–1973) era. At the time, Chile was a middle-class country, with about 30% or 9 million Chileans being middle class. The collapse of Chilean democracy marked the end of a series of democratic governments that had held elections since 1932.

Historian Peter Winn described the 1973 coup as one of the most violent events in Chilean history. The coup led to a series of human rights abuses in Chile under Pinochet, who initiated a brutal and long-lasting campaign of political suppression through torture, murder, and exile, which significantly weakened leftist opposition to the military dictatorship of Chile (1973–1990). Following the internationally supported 1988 referendum about his continuity and the 1989 constitutional reform referendum held under the military junta, Pinochet stepped down from power, leading to the peaceful transition to democracy. Due to the coup's occurrence on the same date as the 11 September 2001 attacks in the United States, it has sometimes been referred to as "the other 9/11".

== Political background ==
Allende contested the 1970 Chilean presidential election with Jorge Alessandri Rodríguez of the National Party and Radomiro Tomic of the Christian Democratic Party. Allende received 36.6% of the vote, while Alessandri was a very close second with 35.3%, and Tomic third with 28.1%, in what was a close three-way election. Although Allende received the highest number of votes, according to the Chilean constitution and since none of the candidates won by an absolute majority, the National Congress had to decide among the candidates.

The Chilean Constitution of 1925 did not allow a person to serve consecutive terms as president. The incumbent president, Eduardo Frei Montalva, was therefore ineligible to run. The CIA's "Track I" operation was a plan to influence Congress to choose Alessandri, who would resign after a short time in office, forcing a second election. Frei would then be eligible to run. Alessandri announced on 9 September that if Congress chose him, he would resign. Allende signed the Statute of Constitutional Guarantees, which stated that he would abide by the constitution during his presidency, in an effort to shore up support for his candidacy. Congress then decided on Allende. The U.S. feared the example of a "well-functioning socialist experiment" in the region and exerted diplomatic, economic, and covert pressure upon Chile's elected socialist government. At the end of 1971, the Cuban Prime Minister Fidel Castro made a four-week state visit to Chile, alarming American observers worried about the "Chilean Way to Socialism".

According to the former KGB agent, Vasili Mitrokhin, the Soviet Union provided financial support for the election of Salvador Allende, with whom it had had ties since the 1950s, by granting him a "personal subsidy of $500,000," which was approved by the Politburo with the aim of "strengthening confidential relations." It is also reported that $18,000 was paid to a left-wing senator to "persuade him not to run as a candidate." Once elected, the USSR provided $30,000 in October 1971 to "consolidate relations of trust" with the Allende government and another $50,000 requested in February 1973, shortly before the 1973 Chilean parliamentary election. The documents also claim that the Soviet intelligence service sought closer cooperation between Chilean intelligence agencies and the Soviet Union, including a possible reorganization of the Chilean Army and intelligence services, proposals to which Allende allegedly reacted positively. The KGB reportedly viewed the Popular Unity government's situation as increasingly difficult by 1972 and criticized Allende for not using "force" against his opponents. After the 1973 Chilean coup d'état, Soviet intelligence officials reportedly complained that Allende had given little importance to their warnings about the possibility of his overthrow.

Allende presided over an increasingly unstable economy. A fiscal deficit of 3.5% in 1970 grew to 24% by 1973. In 1972, Economics Minister Pedro Vuskovic adopted monetary policies that increased the amount of circulating currency and devalued the escudo. That year, inflation increased by 225% and reached 606% by 1973. The high inflation in 1973 decreased wages by 38%. To combat this, Allende created the Committees of Supplies and Prices (Juntas de Abastecimiento y Precios (JAP)). JAP reopened private shops and requisitioned goods that had been slowly disappearing due to declining production.

In October 1972, Chile suffered the first of many strikes. The Trucker's Strike that began on 1 October in Aysen province was a response to economic problems and rumors of transportation nationalization. Eight days later, the Confederation of Truckers, led by Leon Vilarín and supported by the guilds and possibly the CIA, called for an indefinite national strike, which further hindered the movement and distribution of goods that were already struggling. Truckers then blocked all main roads on 12 October, creating a shortage of essential goods. Allende declared a state of emergency in response, and the strike leaders were arrested. This would only further provoke the Chilean population, and more strikes and protests ensued. The state of emergency also failed to reverse the strike or the economic crisis.

Among the participants were small-scale businesspeople, some professional unions, and student groups. Its leaders – Vilarín, Jaime Guzmán, Rafael Cumsille, Guillermo Elton, Eduardo Arriagada – expected to depose the elected government. Other than damaging the national economy, the principal effect of the 24-day strike was drawing Army head, General Carlos Prats, into the government as Interior Minister, an appeasement to the right wing. This replaced General René Schneider, who had been assassinated (Schneider had been shot on 22 October 1970 by a group led by General Roberto Viaux, whom the Central Intelligence Agency had not attempted to discourage, and died three days later) General Prats supported the legalist Schneider Doctrine and refused military involvement in a coup d'état against President Allende.

Despite the declining economy, President Allende's Popular Unity coalition increased its vote to 43.2% in the March 1973 parliamentary elections; but, by then, the informal alliance between Popular Unity and the Christian Democrats ended. The Christian Democrats allied with the right-wing National Party, who were opposed to Allende's government; the two right-wing parties formed the Confederation of Democracy (CODE). The internecine conflict between the legislature and the executive branch paralyzed government operations.

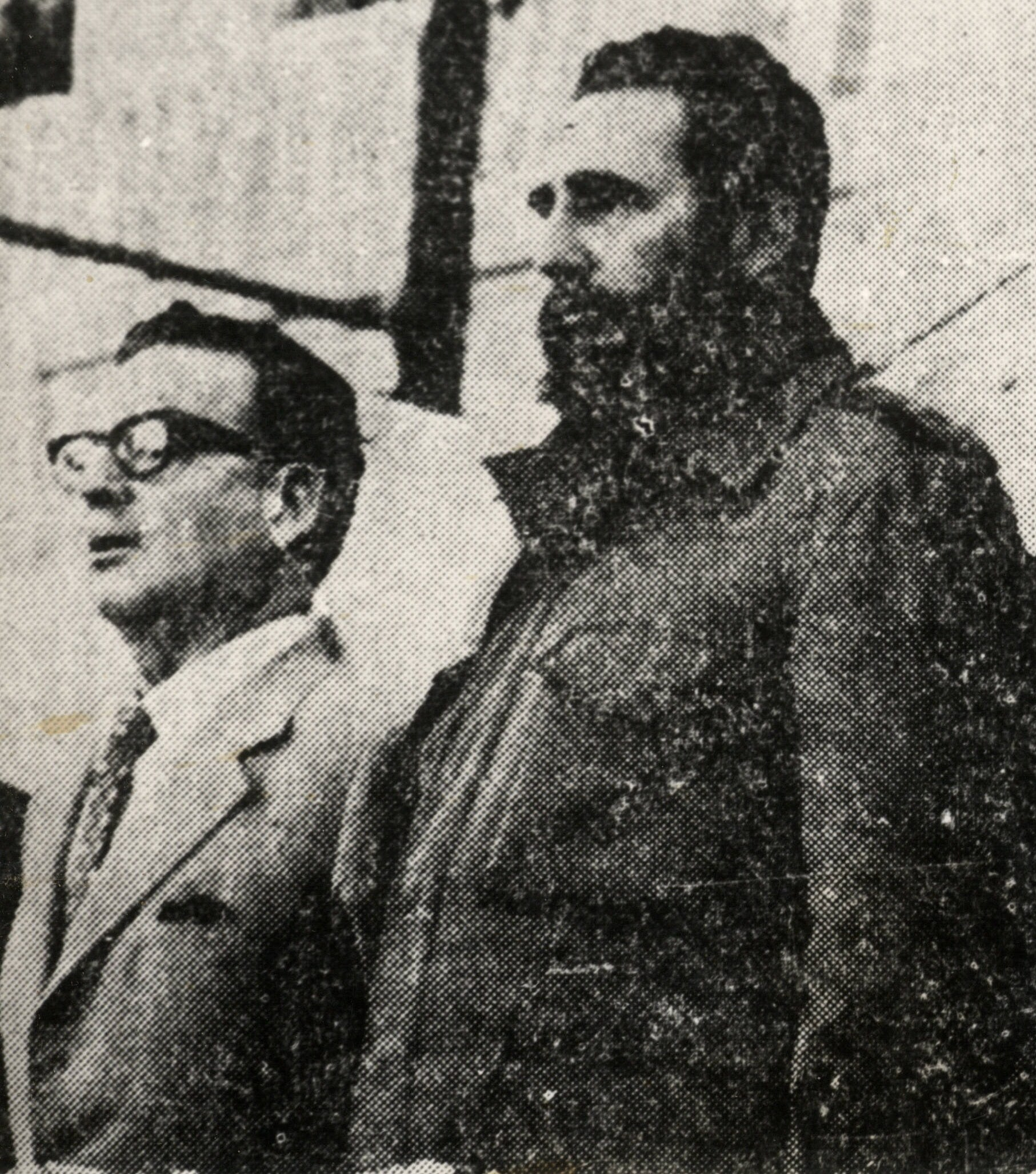
Salvador Allende and Fidel Castro in Chile, 1971 (See State visit by Fidel Castro to Chile).

Allende began to fear his opponents, convinced they were plotting his assassination. Using his daughter Beatriz as a messenger, he explained the situation to Fidel Castro. Castro gave four pieces of advice: convince technicians to stay in Chile, sell only copper for US dollars, do not engage in extreme revolutionary acts which would give opponents an excuse to wreck or seize control of the economy, and maintain a proper relationship with the Chilean military until local militias could be established and consolidated. Allende attempted to follow Castro's advice, but the latter two recommendations proved difficult to implement.

=== Chilean military before the coup ===
Before the coup, the Chilean military had undergone a process of depoliticization since the 1920s, when military officers had held cabinet positions. Subsequently, most military officers remained underfunded, having only subsistence salaries. Because of low salaries, the military spent much of their time in military leisure facilities (e.g., country clubs) where they met other officers and their families. The military remained apart from society and was, to some degree, an endogamous group, as officers frequently married the sisters of their comrades or the daughters of high-ranking older officers. Many officers also had relatives in the military. In 1969, elements of the military made their first act of rebellion in 40 years when they participated in the Tacnazo insurrection. The Tacnazo was not a proper coup, but a protest against under-funding. In retrospect, General Carlos Prats considered that Christian Democrats, who were in power in 1969, committed the error of not taking the military's grievances seriously.

Throughout the 1960s, the governments of Ecuador (1963), Brazil (1964), Argentina (1966), Peru (1968), and Bolivia (1969) were overthrown and replaced by military governments. In June 1973, Uruguay joined the coup d'état wave that swept through the region. The poor conditions of the Chilean military contrasted with the change of fortune the military of neighboring countries experienced as they came to power in coups.

During the decades before the coup, the military became influenced by the United States' anti-communist ideology in the context of various cooperation programs, including the U.S. Army School of the Americas.

== Crisis ==
On 29 June 1973, Colonel Roberto Souper surrounded La Moneda presidential palace with his tank regiment and failed to depose the Allende Government. That failed coup d'état – known as the Tanquetazo tank putsch – had been organized by the nationalist "Fatherland and Liberty" paramilitary group.

In August 1973, a constitutional crisis occurred; the Supreme Court publicly complained about the government's inability to enforce the law of the land. On 22 August, the Christian Democrats united with the National Party of the Chamber of Deputies accused the government of unconstitutional acts and called upon the military to enforce constitutional order.

On August 21, both Tomé and Concepción saw large demonstrations, prompting the Chilean Army and Navy to occupy the two cities. The occupation lasted three weeks, culminating in the assault of the presidential palace, La Moneda, in Santiago.

For months, the government had feared calling upon the Carabineros national police, suspecting them of disloyalty. On 9 August, Allende appointed General Carlos Prats as Minister of Defense. He was forced to resign as both defense minister and Army commander-in-chief on 24 August 1973, embarrassed by the Alejandrina Cox incident and by a public protest by the wives of his generals at his house. General Augusto Pinochet replaced him as Army commander-in-chief the same day. In late August 1973, 100,000 Chilean women congregated at Plaza de la Constitución to protest against the government for the rising cost and increasing shortages of food and fuels, but they were dispersed with tear gas.

=== Resolution by the Chamber of Deputies ===
On 23 August 1973, with the support of the Christian Democrats and National Party members, the Chamber of Deputies passed 81–47 a resolution that asked "the President of the Republic, Ministers of State, and members of the Armed and Police Forces" to "put an immediate end" to "breach[es of] the Constitution ... with the goal of redirecting government activity toward the path of Law and ensuring the Constitutional order of our Nation, and the essential underpinnings of democratic co-existence among Chileans".

The resolution declared that the Allende government sought "to conquer absolute power with the obvious purpose of subjecting all citizens to the strictest political and economic control by the state ... [with] the goal of establishing a totalitarian system", claiming it had made "violations of the Constitution ... a permanent system of conduct". Essentially, most of the accusations were about the government disregarding the separation of powers and abrogating legislative and judicial prerogatives to the executive branch. Finally, the resolution condemned the "creation and development of government-protected armed groups, which ... are headed towards a confrontation with the armed forces". President Allende's efforts to reorganize the military and the police forces were characterized as "notorious attempts to use the armed and police forces for partisan ends, destroy their institutional hierarchy, and politically infiltrate their ranks".

It can be argued that the resolution called upon the armed forces to overthrow the government if it did not comply, as follows: "To present the President of the Republic, Ministers of State, and members of the Armed and Police Forces with the grave breakdown of the legal and constitutional order ... it is their duty to put an immediate end to all situations herein referred to that breach the Constitution and the laws of the land with the aim of redirecting government activity toward the path of Law". The resolution was later used by Pinochet as a way to justify the coup, which occurred two weeks later.

=== Salvador Allende's response ===
On 24 August 1973, two days after the resolution, Allende responded. He accused the opposition of trying to incite a military coup by encouraging the armed forces to disobey civilian authorities. He described the Congress's declaration as "destined to damage the country's prestige abroad and create internal confusion", and predicted: "It will facilitate the seditious intention of certain sectors." He observed that the declaration (passed 81–47 in the Chamber of Deputies) had not obtained the two-thirds Senate majority "constitutionally required" to convict the president of abuse of power, thus the Congress was "invoking the intervention of the armed forces and of Order against a democratically elected government" and "subordinat[ing] political representation of national sovereignty to the armed institutions, which neither can nor ought to assume either political functions or the representation of the popular will."

Allende argued that he had obeyed constitutional means in including military men in the cabinet to serve civic peace and national security, defending republican institutions against insurrection and terrorism. In contrast, he said that Congress was promoting a coup d'état or a civil war with a declaration full of affirmations that had already been refuted, and that, in substance and process (directly handing it to the ministers rather than directly handing it to the president), it violated a dozen articles of the then-current constitution. He further argued that the legislature was usurping the government's executive function.

Allende wrote: "Chilean democracy is a conquest by all of the people. It is neither the work nor the gift of the exploiting classes, and it will be defended by those who, with sacrifices accumulated over generations, have imposed it ... With a tranquil conscience ... I sustain that never before has Chile had a more democratic government than that over which I have the honor to preside ... I solemnly reiterate my decision to develop democracy and a state of law to their ultimate consequences ... Congress has made itself a bastion against the transformations ... and has done everything it can to perturb the functioning of the finances and of the institutions, sterilizing all creative initiatives." Adding that economic and political means would be needed to relieve the country's current crisis, and that the Congress was obstructing said means; having already paralyzed the state, they sought to destroy it. He concluded by calling upon the workers and all democrats and patriots to join him in defending the Chilean constitution and the revolutionary process.

== Preparations ==
Burgee of the Southern Pacific Nautical Brotherhood.

The Southern Pacific Nautical Brotherhood was an important nucleus in the conspiracy to organize the coup d'état against Salvador Allende. (Note: In fact, the movement is traced back to the late 1950s, when economist Sergio de Castro and two other professionals from the Pontifical Catholic University of Chile traveled to the University of Chicago, a key center of neoliberal economic thought, to pursue doctoral studies in economics. Ten years later, in early 1967, the same year as the takeover of the Catholic University and the beginning of university reform, the Faculty of Economics of the UC had moved to its new campus in the precordilleran Los Dominicos area. A large house surrounded by trees and gardens, with tennis and football courts, located on Charles Hamilton Avenue, was purchased thanks to a generous donation from business groups and former students who formed the Foundation of Economic Sciences of the Catholic University. Among the benefactors were the Banco Edwards owned by the group led by Agustín Edwards Eastman, the company El Mercurio S.A. of the same owner, La Papelera (as the Compañía Manufacturera de Papeles y Cartones of the Matte group was known), and the Banco de Chile. Sergio de Castro became dean of that faculty, which functioned as a semi-autonomous territory during the rectorship of Fernando Castillo Velasco. At that time, after the takeover of the Catholic University by students, Sergio de Castro met Jaime Guzmán, a young law student and admirer of Spanish dictator Francisco Franco who founded the Student Guild Movement and later became the main ideologue of Augusto Pinochet. Both were firm opponents of the student movement led by the FEUC, which led Castillo to become the first secular rector of the institution.) (Note: Kelly and Cubillos were effective contacts between the high command of the Navy and the economists led by Sergio de Castro, who had close ties with the owner of El Mercurio.) All its members would later occupy important positions in the de facto government, both within it and from outside it. The meetings were held as rotating dinners in the homes of each member. All members, both civilians and military officers, took an active role in the sedition against the government of Salvador Allende, in the preparation of the coup, and during the dictatorship. The operation name, designed by parts of the Chilean Armed Forces, was originally going to be "Pri-Ancla", but was later changed to "Plan Cochayuyo".

In mid-July, a month before the resolution of the Chamber of Deputies, there was general agreement in the heart of the Army's high command on the desirability of terminating the Unidad Popular "experiment." How to do it was still nebulous. The constitutional generals, gathered around Army Commander-in-Chief General Carlos Prats, were facing pressure from an increasingly hardline anti-Allende faction within the Army. Prats had proposed an Allende–Armed Forces government, including a "political peace treaty" with the Christian Democrats and restricted participation by the Chilean Communist Party and a group of Socialists. Prats argued that "only thus will we prevent the extremist workers from rebelling." This idea had the support of Generals Joaquin Lagos Osorio, Herman Brady Roche, Washington Carrasco Fernandez, Hector Bravo Munoz, Mario Sepulveda Squella, Guillermo Pickering, and Orlando Urbina Herrera, but with variations. While Lagos Osorio and Urbina Herrera did not object to the Prats plan, the other five generals thought the Allende–Armed Forces government ought to be "transitional" and of "short duration," to prepare conditions for a "purely military government, including the military police." The hardline faction, consisting of Generals Óscar Bonilla, Sergio Arellano Stark, and Javier Palacios, formed another group, joined by Augusto Pinochet, which posited that the Allende–Armed Forces phase was not necessary.

== U.S. interference in Allende's Chile ==
"Like Caesar peering into the colonies from distant Rome, Nixon said the choice of government by the Chileans was unacceptable to the president of the United States. The attitude in the White House seemed to be, "If in the wake of Vietnam I can no longer send in the Marines, then I will send in the CIA." — Senator Frank Church, 1976

Many people in different parts of the world immediately suspected the U.S. of foul play. In early newspaper reports, the U.S. denied any involvement or previous knowledge of the coup. Prompted by an incriminating New York Times article, the U.S. Senate opened an investigation into U.S. interference in Chile. A report prepared by the United States Intelligence Community in 2000, at the direction of the National Intelligence Council, that echoed the Church Committee, states that:

Although CIA did not instigate the coup that ended Allende's government on 11 September 1973, it was aware of coup-plotting by the military, had ongoing intelligence collection relationships with some plotters, and – because CIA did not discourage the takeover and had sought to instigate a coup in 1970 – probably appeared to condone it.

The report stated that the CIA "actively supported the military Junta after the overthrow of Allende but did not assist Pinochet to assume the Presidency." After a review of recordings of telephone conversations between Nixon and Henry Kissinger, Robert Dallek concluded that both of them actively used the CIA to destabilize the Allende government. In one particular conversation about the news of Allende's overthrow, Kissinger complained about the lack of recognition of the American role in the overthrow of a "communist" government, upon which Nixon remarked, "Well, we didn't – as you know – our hand doesn't show on this one." A later CIA report contended that US agents maintained close ties with the Chilean military to collect intelligence, but no effort was made to assist them and "under no circumstances attempted to influence them."

Since Allende's inauguration, U.S. policy has been to maintain maximum covert pressure to prevent the Allende regime's consolidation. — William Colby, September 16, 1973, in a memorandum to Henry Kissinger

Historian Peter Winn found "extensive evidence" of United States complicity in creating the conditions prior to the coup during Allende's rule. He states that the covert support to the political opposition was crucial to engineering the coup by the Chilean Armed Forces and to consolidating power by the Pinochet regime following the takeover. Winn documents an extensive CIA operation to fabricate reports of a coup against Allende, as justification for the imposition of military rule. Peter Kornbluh asserts that the CIA destabilized Chile and helped create the conditions for the coup, citing documents declassified by the Clinton administration. Other authors point to the involvement of the Defense Intelligence Agency, agents of which allegedly secured the missiles used to bombard the La Moneda Palace.

The U.S. Government's hostility to the election of Allende in 1970 in Chile was substantiated in documents declassified during the Clinton administration, which show that CIA covert operatives were inserted in Chile to prevent a Marxist government from arising and for the purpose of spreading anti-Allende propaganda. As described in the Church Committee report, the CIA was involved in multiple plots designed to remove Allende and then let the Chileans vote in a new election where he would not be a candidate. The first, non-military, approach involved attempting a constitutional coup. This was known as the Track I approach, in which the CIA, with the approval of the 40 Committee, attempted to bribe the Chilean legislature, tried to influence public opinion against Allende, and provided funding to strikes designed to coerce him into resigning. It also attempted to have Congress confirm Jorge Alessandri as the winner of the presidential election. Alessandri, who was an accessory to the conspiracy, was ready to resign then and call for fresh elections. This approach completely failed in 1970 and was not attempted again.

The other CIA approach in 1970 (but not later), also known as the Track II approach, sought to encourage a military coup by creating a climate of crisis across the country. A CIA telegram sent to the Chile station on 16 October 1970 stated:

It is firm and continuing policy that Allende be overthrown by a coup. It would be much preferable to have this transpire prior to 24 October but efforts in this regard will continue vigorously beyond this date. We are to continue to generate maximum pressure toward this end utilizing every appropriate resource. It is imperative that these actions be implemented clandestinely and securely so that the USG and American hand be well hidden."

False flag operatives contacted senior Chilean military officers and informed them that the U.S. would actively support a coup but would revoke all military aid if it did not occur. In addition, the CIA gave extensive support for black propaganda against Allende, channeled mostly through El Mercurio. Financial assistance was also given to Allende's political opponents to organize strikes and unrest to destabilize the government. By 1970, the U.S. manufacturing company ITT Corporation owned 70% of Chitelco (the Chilean Telephone Company), and also funded El Mercurio. The CIA used ITT as a means of disguising the source of the illegitimate funding Allende's opponents received. On 28 September 1973, the Weather Underground bombed ITT's headquarters in New York City in retaliation.

According to an article written by lifelong CIA operative Jack Devine, although it was widely reported that the CIA was directly involved in orchestrating and carrying out the coup, subsequently released sources suggest a much-reduced role of the US government.

U.S.M.C. Lieutenant Colonel Patrick J. Ryan discussed the Chilean coup and the Kennedy Amendment in his 1976 book titled "Allende's Chile: 1000 Bungled Days", stating:

For ten years the United States fought communism in Vietnam, 7000 miles from California, at a tragic loss of 55,000 American lives, six times as many wounded, not to mention a staggering cost of 150 billion dollars. [...] We lost the war! On the other hand, the Republic of Chile, situated in our hemisphere, fought communism here in America's Backyard, without the aid of B-52's, the 7th Fleet, or even a Bob Hope visit. No American fingers squeezed M-16 triggers, no gruesome parade of American flag draped caskets were airlifted daily from Santiago, Chile, to gravesites in the United States of America. What's more, without our aid, and unencumbered by our tactic of "measured response" the Chileans defeated communism! The United States government not only has not acclaimed Chile's outright defeat of communism, but incredibly, our Senate and Congress, via the Kennedy Amendment to the Foreign Assistance Act, have terminated all military aid to the new anti-communist government of Chile. Why?

— Lieutenant Colonel Patrick J. Ryan, 1976.

== Military action ==
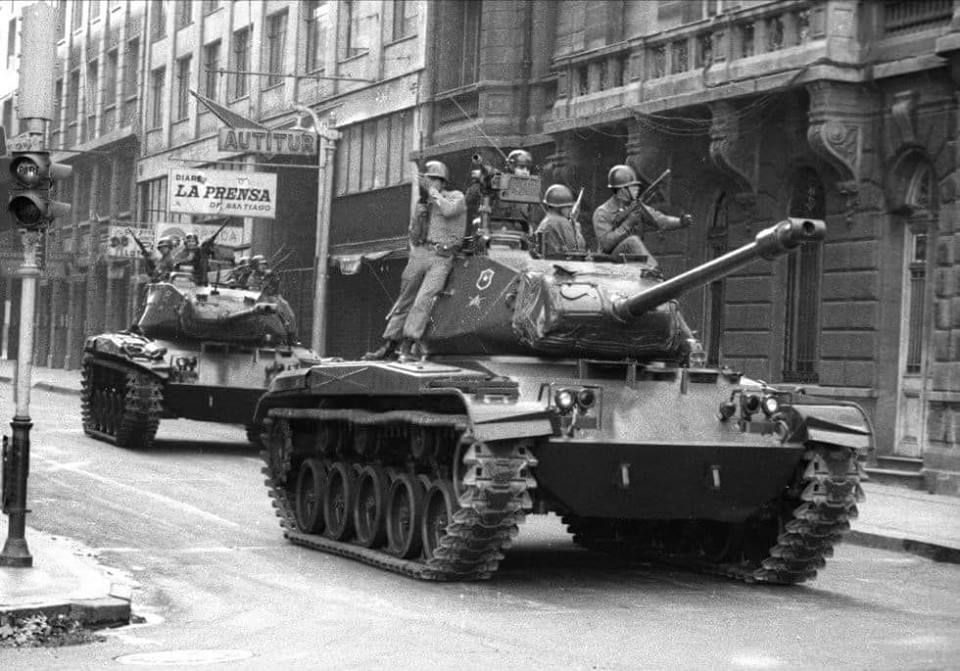
M41 Walker Bulldog of the Chilean Armored Cavalry.

By 6:00 am on 11 September 1973, a date chosen to match a historical 1924 coup, the Navy captured Valparaíso, strategically stationing ships and marine infantry in the central coast and closing radio and television networks. The Province Prefect informed President Allende of the Navy's actions; immediately, the president went to the presidential palace (La Moneda) with his bodyguards, the "Group of Personal Friends" (GAP). By 8:00 a.m., the Army had closed most radio and television stations in Santiago city, one of the first acts of the coup. By 8.30 a.m., both the carabineros and the military broadcast their first edict, which would present a unified front to dispose of Allende. This edict declared that Allende would surrender his office to them, and that the carabineros and armed forces had formed a unified front tasked with protecting Chile "from falling beneath the Marxist yoke." By 9 a.m., the only loyalist broadcast still in control of its station was Radio Magallens, operated by the Chilean Communist Party. The Air Force bombed the remaining active stations, and the President received incomplete information that convinced him that only a sector of the Navy conspired against him and his government.

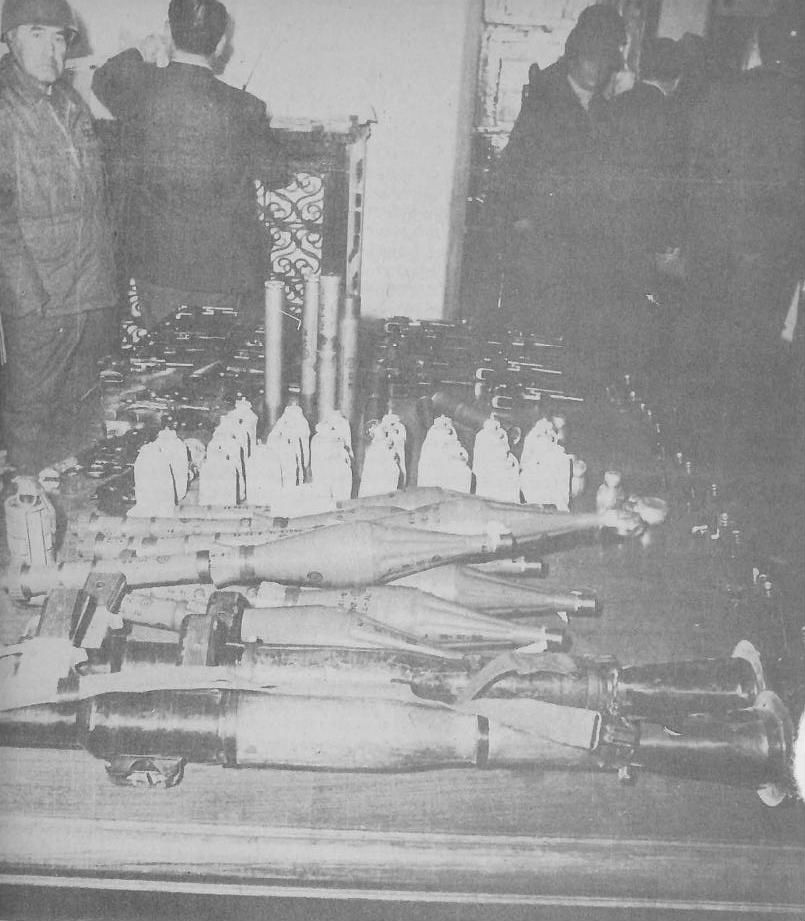
Weapons found at Tomás Moro's presidential residence.

President Allende and Defense Minister Orlando Letelier were unable to communicate with military leaders. The military would arrest Orlando Letelier upon reaching the Defense Ministry. Following this, he would be imprisoned, then exiled and assassinated in Washington D.C. on 21 September 1976. There is evidence that Pinochet ordered his assassination. Admiral Montero, the Navy's commander and an Allende loyalist, was rendered incommunicado; his telephone service was cut, and his cars were sabotaged before the coup d'état to ensure he could not thwart the opposition. Leadership of the Navy was transferred to José Toribio Merino, planner of the coup d'état and executive officer to Adm. Montero. Augusto Pinochet, General of the Army, and Gustavo Leigh, General of the Air Force, did not answer Allende's telephone calls to them. The General Director of the Carabineros (uniformed police), José María Sepúlveda, and the head of the Investigations Police (plain clothes detectives), Alfredo Joignant answered Allende's calls and immediately went to the La Moneda presidential palace. Despite evidence that all branches of the Chilean armed forces were involved in the coup, Allende hoped that some units remained loyal to the government. Allende was convinced of Pinochet's loyalty, telling a reporter that the coup d'état leaders must have imprisoned the general. Only at 8:30 am, when the armed forces declared control of Chile and deposed Allende, did the president grasp the magnitude of the military's rebellion. Despite the lack of any military support, Allende refused to resign his office.

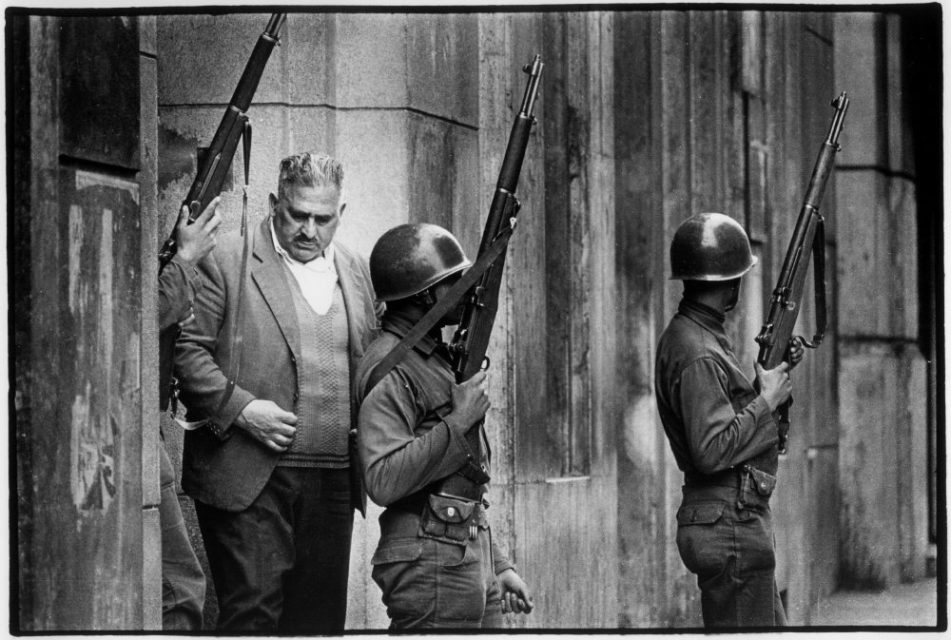
Chilean soldiers carrying M1 Garand rifles near the Moneda Palace.

At approx. 9:00 the carabineros of the La Moneda left the building. By 9:00 a.m., the armed forces controlled Chile, except for the city centre of the capital, Santiago. Originally, the military had planned to arrest Allende at his residence, but he made it to La Moneda, the presidential palace. There, Allende refused to surrender, despite the military declaring they would bomb La Moneda if he resisted being deposed. The military would turn to negotiating with Allende, offering to fly him and his family out of Chile, which Allende would refuse. The Socialist Party, along with his Cuban advisors, proposed to Allende that he escape to the San Joaquín industrial zone in southern Santiago, to later re-group and lead a counter-coup d'état; the president rejected the proposition. According to Tanya Harmer, Allende's refusal to lead an insurgency against the coup is evidence of his unrelenting desire to bring about change through non-violent methods. The Cuban embassy in Chile, located in the Providencia district, was surrounded by units of the Chilean Army. According to former Cuban official Max Marambio, Cuban representatives allegedly attempted to contact Salvador Allende to offer military support during the coup attempt against him, a proposal that the president reportedly declined. The military attempted more negotiations with Allende. Still, the President refused to resign, citing his constitutional duty to remain in office. Finally, at 9:10 a.m., Allende gave a farewell speech, telling the nation of the coup d'état and his refusal to resign his elected office under threat.

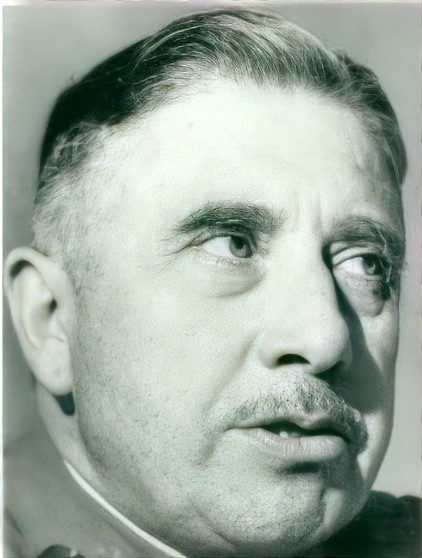
Augusto Pinochet, then Commander-in-Chief of the Army.

Leigh ordered the presidential palace bombed but was told the Air Force's Hawker Hunter jet aircraft would take forty minutes to arrive from their base at Concepcion. Pinochet ordered an armoured and infantry force under General Sergio Arellano to advance upon the La Moneda presidential palace. When the troops moved forward, they were forced to retreat after coming under fire from GAP snipers perched on rooftops. General Arellano called for helicopter gunship support from the commander of the Chilean Army Puma helicopter squadron and the troops were able to advance again. Chilean Air Force aircraft soon arrived to provide close air support for the assault (by bombing the Palace), but the defenders did not surrender until nearly 2:30 pm. Allende's Cuban-trained guard would have had about 300 elite commando-trained GAP fighters at the time of the coup, according to a book of 2005 by Jonathan Haslam, but the use of brute military force, especially the use of Hawker Hunters, may have handicapped many GAP fighters from further action, which was the case of some GAP members during the Hawker Hunters attack against Allende's residence in Tomás Moro.

Allende was found in his inner office dead, from a bullet wound believed to be self-inflicted between 2:00 and 2:30 p.m. Before Allende's suicide, he addressed the nation one final time and stated hope for Chile in the future and wished for the people to stay strong-willed and overcome the darkness. In his own words, he said: "Workers of my country, I have faith in Chile and its destiny. Other men will overcome this dark and bitter moment when treason seeks to prevail. Keep in mind that, much sooner than later, the great avenues will again be opened through which will pass free men to construct a better society. Long live Chile! Long live the people! Long live the workers!"

Pinochet's rule would officially begin at 2:30 p.m. 11 September 1973.

== Casualties ==
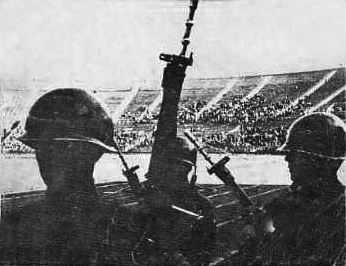
The facilities of the National Stadium were used as a detention and torture center after the coup.

According to official reports prepared after the return of democracy, at La Moneda, only two people died: President Allende and the journalist Augusto Olivares (both by suicide). Two more were injured, Antonio Aguirre and Osvaldo Ramos, both members of President Allende's entourage; they would later be allegedly kidnapped from the hospital and disappeared. In November 2006, the Associated Press noted that more than 15 bodyguards and aides were taken from the palace during the coup and are still unaccounted for; in 2006, Augusto Pinochet was indicted for two of their deaths.

On the military side, there were 34 deaths: two army sergeants, three army corporals, four army privates, two navy lieutenants, one navy corporal, four naval cadets, three navy conscripts and 15 carabineros. In mid-September, the Chilean military junta claimed its troops suffered another 16 dead and 100 injured by gunfire in mopping-up operations against Allende supporters, and Pinochet said: "sadly there are still some armed groups who insist on attacking, which means that the military rules of wartime apply to them." A press photographer also died in the crossfire while attempting to cover the event. On 23 October 1973, 23-year-old army corporal Benjamín Alfredo Jaramillo Ruz, who was serving with the Cazadores, became the first fatal casualty of the counterinsurgency operations in the mountainous area of Alquihue in Valdivia after being shot by a sniper. The Chilean Army suffered 12 killed in various clashes with MIR guerrillas and GAP fighters in October 1973.

While fatalities in the battle during the coup might have been relatively small, the Chilean security forces sustained 162 dead in the three following months as a result of continued resistance, and tens of thousands of people were arrested during the coup and held in the National Stadium. An estimated 40,000 Chileans were tortured under the Pinochet regime in the years following the coup.

== Allende's death ==
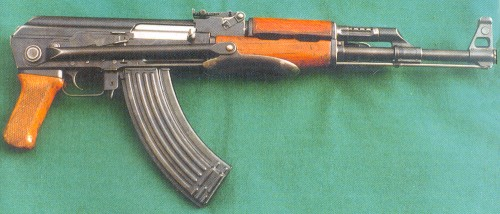
Soviet AKMS assault rifle with a folding stock, the same type Allende used to commit suicide.

President Allende died in La Moneda during the coup. The junta officially declared that he committed suicide with a rifle given to him by Fidel Castro, two doctors from the infirmary of La Moneda stated that they witnessed the suicide, and an autopsy labelled Allende's death a suicide. Vice Admiral Patricio Carvajal, one of the primary instigators of the coup, claimed that "Allende committed suicide and is dead now." Patricio Guijon, one of the president's doctors, had testified to witnessing Allende shoot himself under the chin with the rifle while seated on a sofa.

At the time, few of Allende's supporters believed the explanation that Allende had killed himself. Allende's body was exhumed in May 2011. The exhumation was requested by members of the Allende family, including his daughter Isabel, who viewed the question of her father's death as "an insult to scientific intelligence." A scientific autopsy was performed, and the autopsy team delivered a unanimous finding on 19 July 2011 that Allende committed suicide using an AK-47 rifle. The team was composed of international forensic experts to ensure an independent evaluation.

However, on 31 May 2011, Chile's state television station reported that a top-secret military account of Allende's death had been discovered in the home of a former military justice official. The 300-page document was found only when the house was destroyed in the 2010 Chilean earthquake. After reviewing the report, two forensic experts told Televisión Nacional de Chile "that they are inclined to conclude that Allende was assassinated." Two forensics experts said they believed he was shot with a small-calibre weapon before the AK-47. One expert, Luis Ravanal, noted the lack of blood on his collar, sweater, and throat suggested someone else fired the AK-47 when he was already dead.

Allende's widow and family escaped the military government and were granted asylum in Mexico, where they remained for 17 years.

== Aftermath ==
=== Installing a new regime ===
Original members of the Government Junta of Chile (1973)

On 13 September, the Junta dissolved Congress, outlawed the parties that had been part of the Popular Unity coalition; all political activity was declared "in recess". The military government took control of all media, including the radio broadcasting that Allende attempted to use to give his final speech to the nation. It is not known how many Chileans actually heard Allende's last words as he spoke them, but a transcript and audio of the speech survived the military government. Chilean scholar Lidia M. Baltra details how the military took control of the media platforms and turned them into their own "propaganda machine". The only two newspapers that were allowed to continue publishing after the military takeover were El Mercurio and La Tercera de la Hora, both of which were anti-Allende under his leadership. The dictatorship's silencing of the leftist point of view extended past the media and into "every discourse that expressed any resistance to the regime". An example of this is the torturing and death of folk singer Víctor Jara. The military government detained Jara in the days following the coup. He, along with many other leftists, was held in Estadio Nacional, or the National Stadium of Chile, in the capital of Santiago. Initially, the Junta tried to silence him by crushing his hands, but ultimately, he was murdered. Immediately after the coup the military sought television host Don Francisco to have him report on the events. Don Francisco declined the offer, encouraging the captain who had approached him to take the role of reporter himself.

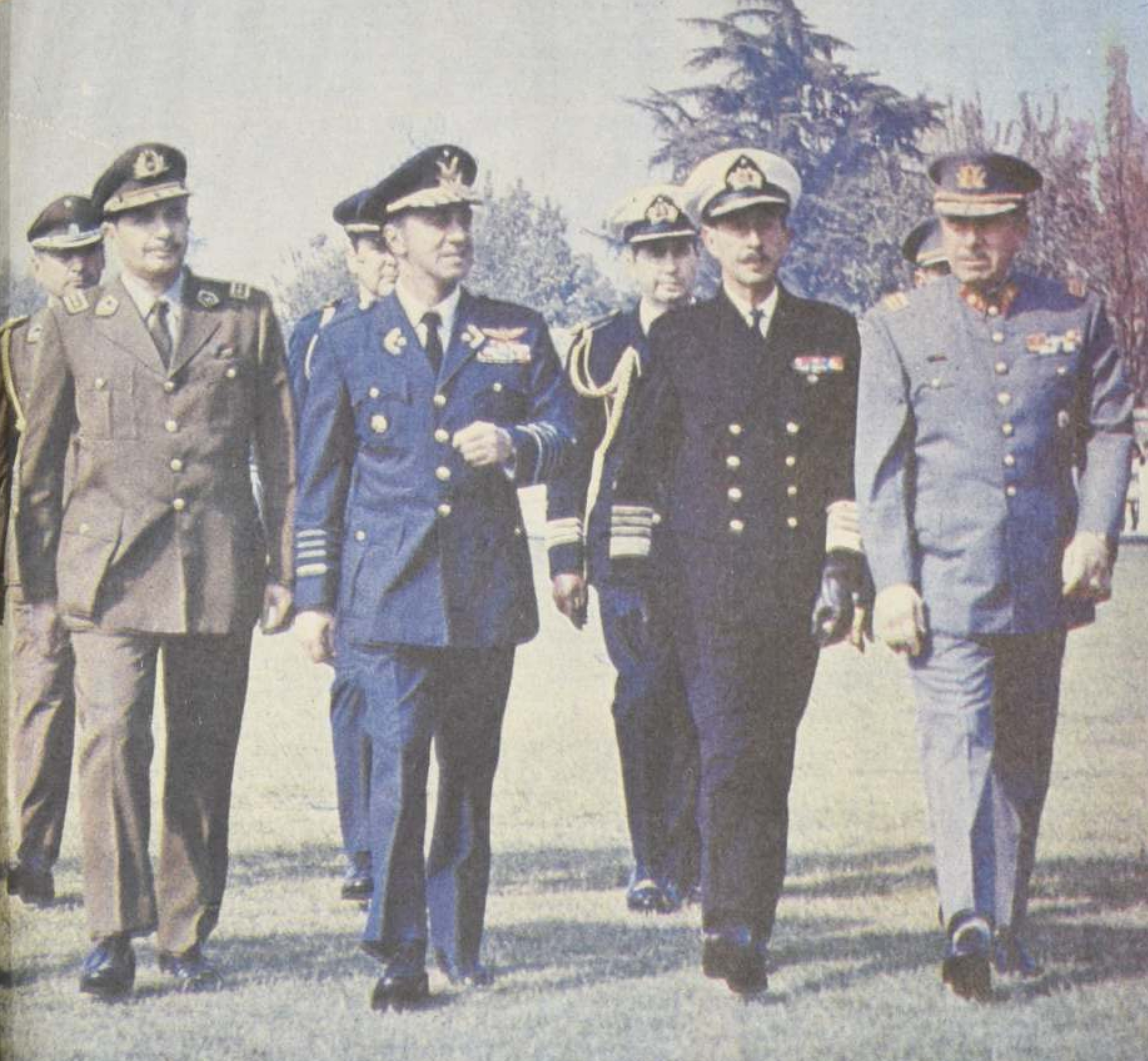
The Military Junta in 1974: from left to right, César Mendoza, Gustavo Leigh, José Toribio Merino, and Augusto Pinochet.

Initially, there were four leaders of the junta: In addition to General Augusto Pinochet, from the Army, there were General Gustavo Leigh Guzmán, of the Air Force; Admiral José Toribio Merino Castro, of the Navy (who replaced Constitutionalist Admiral Raúl Montero); and General Director César Mendoza Durán, of the National Police (Carabineros de Chile) (who replaced Constitutionalist General Director José María Sepúlveda). Coup leaders soon decided against a rotating presidency and named General Pinochet permanent head of the junta which would establish a 17-year-long civil-military dictatorship.

In the months that followed the coup, the junta, with authoring work by historian Gonzalo Vial and Admiral Patricio Carvajal, published a book titled El Libro Blanco del cambio de gobierno en Chile (commonly known as El Libro Blanco, "The White Book of the Change of Government in Chile"), where they attempted to justify the coup by claiming that they were in fact anticipating a self-coup (the alleged Plan Zeta, or Plan Z) that Allende's government or its associates were purportedly preparing. Historian Peter Winn states that the Central Intelligence Agency had an extensive part to play in fabricating the conspiracy and in selling it to the press, both in Chile and internationally. Although later discredited and officially recognized as the product of political propaganda, Gonzalo Vial has pointed to the similarities between the alleged Plan Z and other existing paramilitary plans of the Popular Unity parties in support of its legitimacy.

A document from September 13 shows that Jaime Guzmán was already, by then, tasked with studying the creation of a new constitution. One of the first measures of the dictatorship was to set up a Secretaría Nacional de la Juventud (SNJ, National Youth Office). This was done on 28 October 1973, even before the Declaration of Principles of the junta made in March 1974. This was a way of mobilizing sympathetic elements of the civil society in support of the dictatorship.

=== Continued violence ===
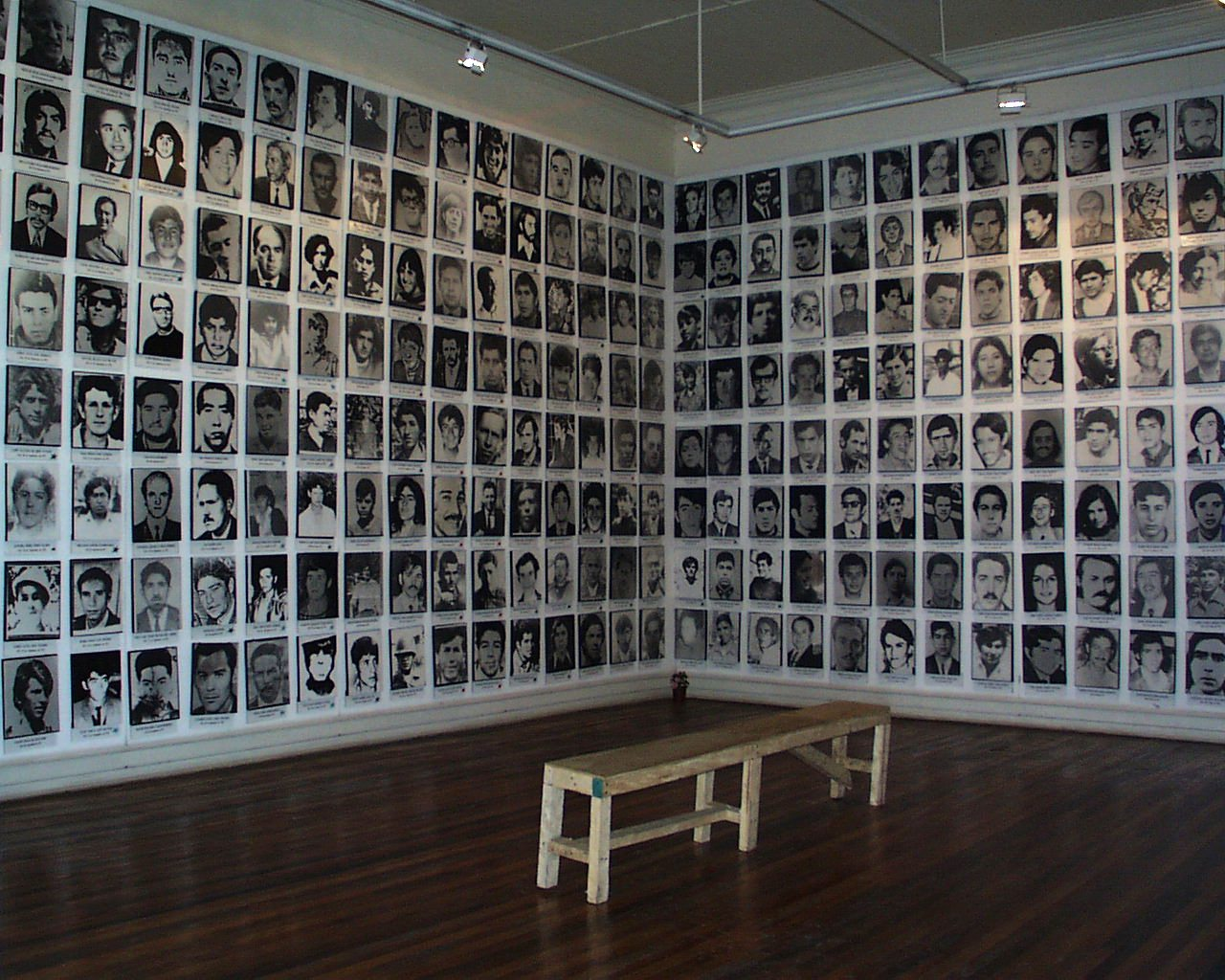
Pictures of persons missing after the 1973 Chilean coup

In the first months after the coup d'état, the military killed thousands of Chilean leftists, both real and suspected, or forced their "disappearance". The military imprisoned 40,000 political enemies in the National Stadium of Chile; among the tortured and killed desaparecidos (disappeared) were the U.S. citizens Charles Horman and Frank Teruggi. In September 1973, the Chilean songwriter Víctor Jara was murdered, along with 70 other people in a series of killings perpetrated by the death squad Caravan of Death (Caravana de la Muerte).

The government arrested some 130,000 people in a three-year period; the dead and disappeared numbered thousands in the first months of the military government. In Valparaiso, it is estimated that there were 6,918 victims of political capture and torture. Those include the British physician Sheila Cassidy, who survived to publicize in the UK the human rights violations in Chile. Among those detained was Alberto Bachelet (father of future Chilean President Michelle Bachelet), an Air Force official; he was tortured and died on 12 March 1974, the right-wing newspaper, El Mercurio, reported that Mr. Bachelet died after a basketball game, citing his poor cardiac health. Michelle Bachelet and her mother were imprisoned and tortured in the Villa Grimaldi detention and torture centre on 10 January 1975.

The newspaper La Tercera published on its front page a photograph showing prisoners at Quiriquina Island Camp who had been captured during the fighting in Concepción. The photograph's caption stated that some of the detained were "local bosses of Unidad Popular" while others were "extremists who had attacked the armed forces with firearms". The photo was reproduced 2013 in The Indicter, identifying among the 'local bosses' Fernando Alvarez, then Concepción Province's head authority appointed by Allende (executed one month thereafter); and among the fighting 'extremists', Marcello Ferrada de Noli, one founder of MIR and then professor at the University of Concepción.

This is consistent with reports in newspapers and broadcasts in Concepción about the activities of the Armed Forces, which mentioned clashes with "extremists" on several occasions from 11 to 14 September. Nocturnal skirmishes took place around the Hotel Alonso de Ercilla on Colo Colo and San Martín Streets, one block from the Army and military police administrative headquarters. A recently published testimony about the clashes in Concepción offers several plausible explanations for witnesses' reticence to report these actions.

Besides political leaders and participants, the coup also affected many everyday Chilean citizens. Pinochet and the military junta proclaimed that they were going to get rid of "the cancerous tumor," in reference to Chile's left. Thousands were killed, went missing, and were injured. Thousands more emigrated or were exiled due to political instability in their regions, and many relocated elsewhere. Canada, among other countries, became a major refuge for many Chilean citizens. Through an operation known as "Special Movement Chile", more than 7,000 Chileans were relocated to Canada in the months following 11 September 1973. These refugees are now known as Chilean Canadian people and have a population of over 38,000. Chileans would find asylum in over 40 countries around the world. While the exact number is unknown, it is estimated that at least 200,000 Chileans left Chile between 1973 and 1990, the largest flow of emigration in Chile's history.

After Gen. Pinochet lost the election in the 1988 plebiscite, the Rettig Commission, a multi-partisan truth commission, in 1991 reported the location of torture and detention centers, among others, Colonia Dignidad, the tall ship Esmeralda and Víctor Jara Stadium. Later, in November 2004, the Valech Report confirmed the number as fewer than 3,000 killed and reduced the number of cases of forced disappearance; but some 28,000 people were arrested, imprisoned, and tortured. Sixty individuals died as a direct result of fighting on 11 September, although the MIR and GAP continued to fight the following day. It has been put forward that, in all, 46 of Allende's guard (the GAP, Grupo de Amigos Personales) were killed, some of them in combat with the soldiers that took the Moneda. However, a report of 1999 published by an organization of ex-GAP which survived the events around the coup d'état, says that no one among the GAP members were killed in La Moneda combat. The source affirms that there were only 50 GAP members at that time. The same information about the number of GAP members was later confirmed in an academic publication.

The U.S. view of the coup continues to spark controversy. Beginning in late 2014 in response to a request by Senate Armed Services Committee Chair Carl Levin, United States Southern Command (USSOUTHCOM) William J. Perry Center for Hemispheric Defense Studies (CHDS), located at the National Defense University in Washington, D.C., has been under investigation by the Department of Defense Office of Inspector General. Insider national security whistleblower complaints included that the Center knowingly protected a CHDS professor from Chile who was a former top advisor to Pinochet after belonging to the Dirección de Inteligencia Nacional / DINA state terrorist organization (whose attack against a former Chilean foreign minister in 1976 in Washington, D.C., resulted in two deaths, including that of an American). "Reports that NDU hired foreign military officers with histories of involvement in human rights abuses, including torture and extrajudicial killings of civilians, are stunning, and they are repulsive", said Sen. Patrick Leahy, D-Vermont, the author of the "Leahy Law" prohibiting U.S. assistance to military units and members of foreign security forces that violate human rights.

Roberto Thieme, the military leader of Fatherland and Liberty, who was imprisoned on 11 September, was shocked to hear about the degree of violence with which the coup was carried out. Despite being an arduous opponent of Unidad Popular, he had expected a cleaner coup.

=== International reaction ===
President of Argentina Juan Domingo Perón condemned the coup, calling it a "fatality for the continent". Before the coup Perón had warned the more radical of his followers to stay calm and "not do as Allende". Argentine students protested the coup at the Chilean embassy in Buenos Aires, where part of them chanted that they were "ready to cross the Andes" (dispuestos a cruzar la cordillera).

In fragmenting Francoist Spain, the coup came as a shock to the opposition many whom immediately identified the parallels between Francisco Franco and Pinochet and between the coup and the Spanish Civil War. Since Spain was still under authoritarian rule the opposition was limited in its range of action. The Spanish Socialist Workers' Party officially condemned the coup in its 1974 congress in France, and Mundo Obrero of the Communist Party of Spain called for resistance against the new regime. Instead of radicalizing, the Chilean coup led the Spanish opposition to moderate its positions, as the socialist Enrique Tierno Galván would acknowledge.

=== Legal impact ===
Many cargo shipments involving trade with Cuba were affected by government policy decisions, and, subsequently, the performance of the trade contracts underlying the shipping deliveries was made illegal under Cuban law. The Chilean company Iansa had purchased sugar from the Cuban business entity, Cubazukar. Several shipments were at different stages of the shipping and delivery process. The ships involved included:

- Playa Larga (delivery in Chile was underway, but was not completed before the ship left)
- The Marble Island (the ship was en route for Chile but was diverted elsewhere)
- Aegis Fame (hire was cancelled before the cargo had been loaded).

The shipping contracts used the CIF trade terms. Iansa sued Cubazukar for non-delivery. The High Court (in England) ruled that IANSA was entitled to damages in respect of the undelivered balance of the Playa Larga cargo and to restitution of the price paid for the Marble Island cargo. Subsequent appeals by both parties were dismissed. Regarding the Aegis Fame shipping, the contract was frustrated and therefore Cubazukar were not in breach.

== Commemoration ==
The commemoration of the coup is associated with competing narratives about its causes and effects. The coup has been commemorated by detractors and supporters in various ways.

On 11 September 1975, Pinochet lit the Llama de la Libertad (lit. 'Flame of Liberty') to commemorate the coup. This flame was extinguished in 2004. Avenida Nueva Providencia in Providencia, Santiago, was renamed Avenida 11 de Septiembre in 1980. In the 30th anniversary of the coup President Ricardo Lagos inaugurated the Morandé 80 entrance to La Moneda. This entrance to the presidential palace had been erased during the repairs the dictatorship did to the building after the bombing.

=== 40th anniversary ===
The 40th anniversary of the coup in 2013 was particularly intense. That year the name of Avenida 11 de Septiembre was reversed to the original Avenida Nueva Providencia. The Association of Chilean Magistrates issued a public statement in early September 2013 recognizing the past unwillingness of judges to protect those persecuted by dictatorship. On 11 September 2013 hundreds of Chileans posed as dead in the streets of Santiago in remembrance of the ones "disappeared" by the dictatorship.

The centre-left opposition refused to attend the commemoration event organized by Sebastián Piñera's right-wing government, organizing a separate event instead. Osvaldo Andrade of the Socialist Party explained that attendance was not viable as Piñera's government was "packed with passive accomplices" of the dictatorship. Some right-wing politicians also declined the invitation. Presidential candidate Michelle Bachelet planned to spend the day visiting Museum of Memory and Human Rights. President Piñera held an unusual speech in which he denounced "passive accomplices" like news reporters who deliberately changed or omitted the truth and judges who rejected recursos de amparos that could have saved lives. People who knew things or could have known things but decided to stay quiet were also criticized as passive accomplices in Piñera's speech.

Many new films, theatre plays, and photography expositions were held to cast light on the abuses and censorship of the dictatorship. The number of new books published on the subject in 2013 was such that it constituted an editorial boom. The Museum of Memory and Human Rights also displayed a collection of declassified CIA, FBI, Defense Department, and White House records illustrating the U.S. role in the dictatorship and the coup. Conferences and seminars on the subject of coup were also held. Various series and interviews with politicians about the coup and the dictatorship were aired on Chilean TV in 2013.

=== 50th anniversary ===
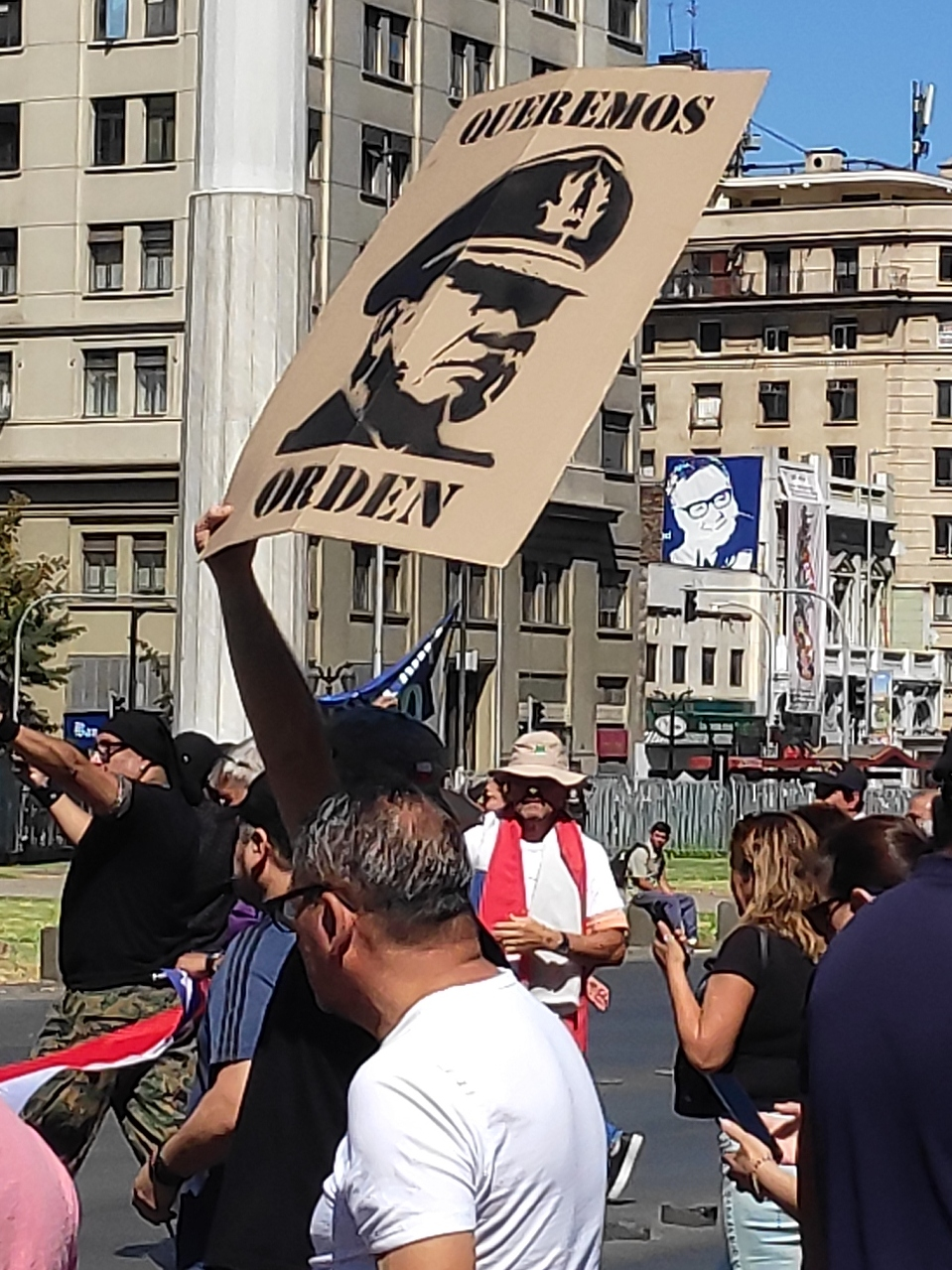
Pro–Pinochet protester holding a sign with Pinochet's face that says "We want order" in May 2023. In the background, there is another sign with Allende's face.

Ahead of the 50th anniversary of the coup in 2023, the United States, under the Biden administration, declassified President Nixon's daily briefs on Chile from 8 to 11 September 1973. The document for 8 September read: "A number of reports have been received... indicating the possibility of an early military coup. Navy men plotting to overthrow the government now claim army and air force support." It further noted that the far-right paramilitary group, Fatherland and Freedom, "has been blocking roads and provoking clashes with the national police, adding to the tension caused by continuing strikes and opposition political moves. President Allende earlier this week said he believed the armed forces will ask for his resignation if he does not change his economic and political policies."

The week before the anniversary, Chilean President Gabriel Boric, along with all four living former presidents – Eduardo Frei Ruiz-Tagle, Ricardo Lagos, Michelle Bachelet, and Sebastian Piñera – signed a declaration titled "Commitment: For Democracy, Forever", stating that it should "confront the challenges of democracy with more democracy" and it should defend and promote human rights. The right-wing opposition called it "biased" and refused to sign it.

On the day of the anniversary, Boric, Bachelet, and many world leaders, including Mexico's Andrés Manuel López Obrador, Portugal's António Costa, Colombia's Gustavo Petro, Bolivia's Luis Arce, and Uruguay's Luis Lacalle Pou attended a commemoration in La Moneda presidential palace to commemorate the coup and its aftermath. Others who attended were former Uruguayan president José Mujica and lead Rage Against the Machine guitarist Tom Morello, who said that the United States "shares responsibility" for the coup.

At the commemoration, Boric said:

A coup d'état or the violation of the human rights of those who think differently is never justifiable. It is crucial to clearly state that the coup d'état cannot be separated from what came afterward. Human-rights violations of Chilean men and women began right from the moment of the coup [...] It was a dictatorship until the end [...] Reconciliation is not achieved through neutrality or distance but by unequivocally standing with those who were victims of the horror. Reconciliation, dear compatriots, does not involve attempting to equate the responsibilities between victims and perpetrators.

Surveys showed that 60% of Chileans surveyed were not interested in the commemoration, while another poll claimed that nearly 40% believed Pinochet "modernised" the country. Other data found that more than a third of Chileans believed the coup was justified.

== See also ==
- Allende en su laberinto
- Cuban packages – arms smuggling from Cuba
- Operation Condor
- Operation TOUCAN (KGB) – secret KGB operations in Chile
- Patio 29
- Project FUBELT – secret CIA operations to unseat Allende.
- René Schneider
- United States involvement in regime change in Latin America

=== Films and documentaries ===
- Bear Story
- Bestia
- The Border Crossing: Der Übergang, a DEFA drama
- Chicago Boys
- Colonia
- Ecos del Desierto
- Invisible Heroes
- Machuca
- Missing (1982 film)
- ¡Nae pasaran!
- No
- ReMastered: Massacre at the Stadium
- The Battle of Chile
- The Black Pimpernel
- The House of the Spirits
- Wild Horse Nine

== Bibliography ==
- Bawden, John R. (2016). The Pinochet generation: the Chilean military in the twentieth century. Tuscaloosa: The University of Alabama Press. ISBN 978-0-8173-1928-1.
- Collier, Simon; Sater, William F. (1996). A history of Chile, 1808–1994. Cambridge University Press. ISBN 978-0-521-56827-2.
- Faúndez, Julio (1988). Marxism and democracy in Chile: from 1932 to the fall of Allende. Yale University Press. ISBN 978-0-300-04024-1.
- Camus, Ignacio González (1988). El día en que murió Allende [The day that Allende Died] (in Spanish). Santiago: CESOC. ISBN 978-9-563-24196-9.
- González, Mónica (2012). La conjura: los mil y un dias del golpe [The conspiracy: the thousand and one days of the coup]. Periodismo de Investigación (in Spanish). Santiago de Chile: Ediciones Universidad Diego Portales. ISBN 978-956-324-134-1.
- Hoogvelt, Ankie M. M. (2017) [1997]. Globalization and the Postcolonial World: The New Political Economy of Development. Bloomsbury Publishing. ISBN 978-1-137-06331-1.
- Karamessines, Thomas (1970). "Operating guidance cable on coup plotting in Chile". United States National Security Council. Washington.
- Hurtado Torres, Sebastián (10 October 2016). "Chile y Estados Unidos, 1964-1973. Una nueva mirada" [Chile and the United States, 1964–1973: A New Perspective]. Nuevo Mundo Mundos Nuevos (in Spanish). doi:10.4000/nuevomundo.69698.
- Juan Paulo Iglesias (25 August 2023). "Sebastián Hurtado, historiador: 'Estados Unidos no tuvo participación directa en el Golpe, pero sí quería que Allende cayera'" [Sebastián Hurtado, historian: “The United States did not play a direct role in the coup, but it did want Allende to fall.”] (in Spanish). La Tercera. Archived from the original on 12 September 2024.
- Kirkpatrick, Jeane (November 1979). "Dictatorships and Double Standards". Commentary. Vol. 68, no. 5. pp. 34–45.
- Kissinger, Henry (9 November 1970). "National Security Decision 93: Policy Towards Chile". United States National Security Council. Washington.
- Carlos Basso Prieto (2013). La CIA en Chile 1970-1973 [The CIA in Chile, 1970–1973] (in Spanish). Chile: Aguilar. ISBN 978-9-56347-637-8.
- Kornbluh, Peter (2003). The Pinochet file: a declassified dossier on atrocity and accountability. New York: The New Press. ISBN 978-1-56584-586-2.
- Norton-Taylor, Richard (8 July 1999). "Truth will out: Unearthing the declassified documents in America which give the lie to Lady Thatcher's outburst". The Guardian.
- Nove, Alec (2012). Socialism, Economics and Development. Routledge. ISBN 978-1-136-58266-0.
- Petras, James F.; Morley, Morris H. (1974). How Allende fell: a study in U.S.–Chilean relations. Nottingham: Spokesman Books. ISBN 978-0-85124-090-9.
- Sigmund, Paul E. (1986). "6: Development Strategies in Chile, 1964–1983: The Lessons of Failure". In Kim, Ilpyong J. (ed.). Development and cultural change: cross-cultural perspectives. An Icus Book Science and values series (2nd ed.). New York: Paragon House. pp. 159–178. ISBN 978-0-89226-041-6.
- Valenzuela, J. Samuel; Valenzuela, Arturo (1993). "Modernisation and Dependency: Alternative Perspectives in the Study of Latin-American Underdevelopment". In Seligson, Mitchell A.; Passé-Smith, John T. (eds.). Development and underdevelopment: the political economy of inequality. L. Rienner Publishers. pp. 203–216. ISBN 978-1-55587-400-1.
