= José Muñoz Alcoholado =

- Died: Venezuela
- Other names: Chico Alejo
- Citizenship: Chile
- Occupation: Revolutionary

José Muñoz Alcoholado (nom de guerre "Chico Alejo") was a Chilean Marxist revolutionary.

During the late 20th century and early 21st century, Muñoz was a member of a variety of insurgent movements across Latin America, including Peru's Túpac Amaru Revolutionary Movement and Colombia's National Liberation Army (ELN). In the 1980s, he broke with other members of the Revolutionary Left Movement due to ideological differences and co-founded the MIR Guerrilla Army of the Poor (EGP). He was murdered by contract killers in 2017 in Venezuela where he was living after fleeing arrest in Chile on charges related to a major factory robbery.

Muñoz was the son of José Muñoz, who served as a captain in the Carabineros de Chile in the early 1970s and was the commander of the palace guard of La Moneda at the time of the 1973 Chilean coup d'etat.

== See also ==
- Che Guevara
- Group of Personal Friends
