= Group of Personal Friends =

- Grupo de Amigos Personales
- Active: 1970–1973
- Country: Chile
- Allegiance: Socialist Party of Chile
- Type: Irregular military
- Role: Bodyguard
- Size: 50 (1973 approximate)
- Nickname: GAP
- Engagements: 1973 Chilean coup d'état

Commanders
- Final leader: Domingo Blanco Tarré (nom de guerre "Bruno the White")
- Founder: Fernando Gómez

The Group of Personal Friends (Spanish: Grupo de Amigos Personales), sometimes referred to by the Spanish acronym GAP, was the informal name of an unnamed, armed guard of the Socialist Party of Chile maintained from 1970 to 1973 for the protection of Salvador Allende. The GAP was trained and equipped by Cuba and initially composed of ex-guerrilla fighters.

The GAP engaged the Chilean Armed Forces during the 1973 Chilean coup d'etat and were among the few armed defenders of La Moneda who remained at their posts following the withdrawal of the Carabineros de Chile and the Investigations Police of Chile. They were completely wiped out during the attack, with most Friends either killed in battle or executed after the fall of the palace. Some of those killed during the coup are memorialized in a plaque at the Intendencia de Santiago.

== History ==
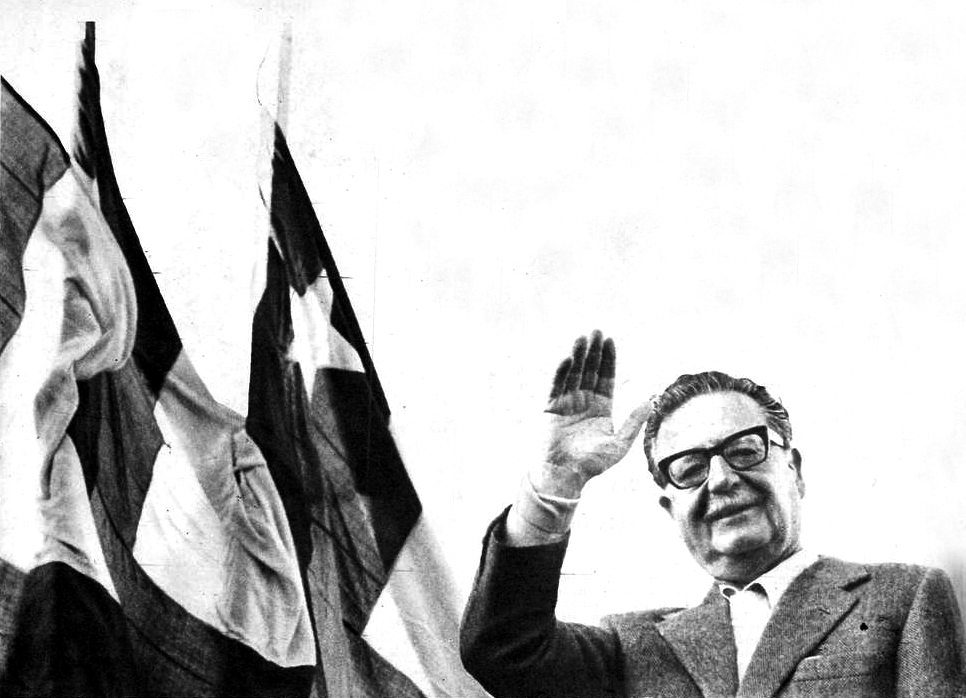
The GAP was initially formed to protect Salvador Allende (pictured) during the 1970 Chilean presidential election.

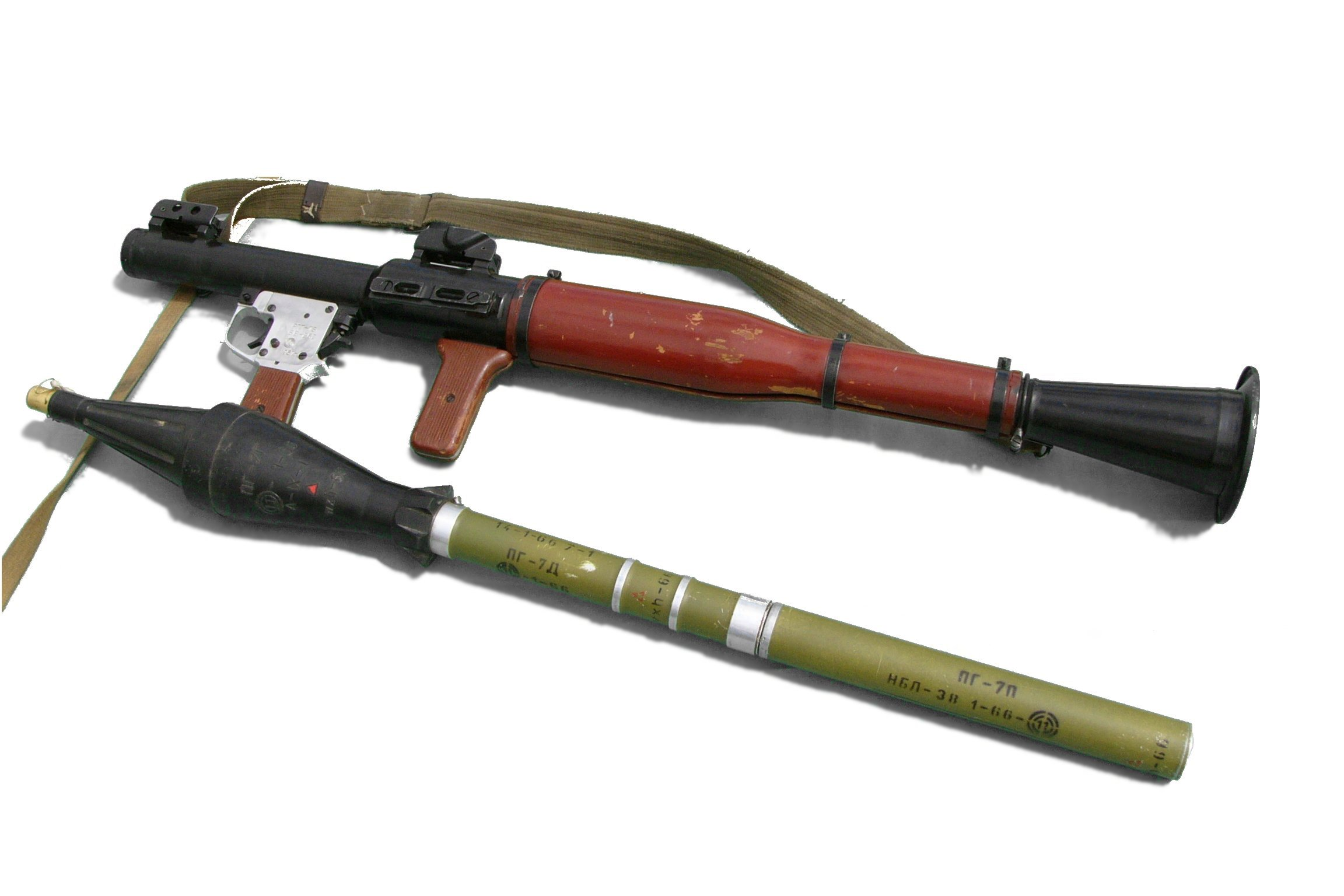
The GAP was equipped with Cuban-donated RPG-7 anti-tank weapons.

=== Formation ===
The Group of Personal Friends (Spanish: Grupo de Amigos Personales) was formed to serve as Salvador Allende's bodyguard during his 1970 presidential campaign by Fernando Gómez, a former member of the Cuban-trained Ñancahuazú Guerrilla (ELN), at the instigation of Allende's daughter, Beatriz Allende. By the time of the election, the GAP had expanded with the addition of more ex-ELN combatants volunteering to provide security to Allende and, later, members of the Revolutionary Left Movement (MIR).

Cuba provided technical advisers to assist the GAP, including among them Tony de la Guardia and Patricio de la Guardia.

=== Presidential protection ===
The assassination of General René Schneider in 1970 led Allende to decide to keep the GAP mobilized as a praetorian guard following his inauguration. It was reasoned that if the political right were willing to kill even high-ranking Chilean Army officers, they would not hesitate to assassinate the president himself, and Allende could not rely on the PDI and carabineros alone for protection, but needed the support of persons personally loyal to him.

On one of Allende's first public appearances after his inauguration, a Chilean journalist inquired of the president who the armed men accompanying him were, to which Allende replied, "a group of personal friends", giving the group the moniker from which it would thereafter be known. During the 1971 visit of Fidel Castro to Chile, Cuban protection officers brought with them an unusually large arsenal, including RPG-7s and AK-47s, leaving almost the entire quantity behind in Chile for the previously pistol-equipped GAP.

Allende came to rely on the GAP as his principal protective force, despite the organization having no formal legal status; in 1974 testimony to the United States House of Representatives, Hermógenes Pérez de Arce Ibieta contended GAP "was illegal", a point, he said, was "many times represented, fruitlessly, to Allende". GAP leveraged its hybrid status to conduct reconnaissance and intelligence-gathering in Chile under the pretense of presidential protection, but with information actually being collected for the benefit of MIR paramilitary operations against the political right-wing. However, a 1972 operation in Curimon, in which intoxicated GAP personnel fumbled their mission to locate the whereabouts of Arturo Marshall, an ex-Chilean soldier purported to be working as a United States-linked assassin, made Chilean military intelligence aware of the use of GAP in this manner. This led to the disentanglement of the GAP from MIR, which was put under the formal control of the ruling Socialist Party, leading to the resignation or dismissal of many of the MIR members of the GAP.

=== Defense of La Moneda ===
At the outset of the 1973 Chilean coup d'état, the presidential palace of La Moneda was defended by members of the GAP, 20 detectives of the Investigations Police of Chile (PDI), and 300 carabineros. As news of the military uprising reached Santiago, GAP head Domingo Blanco Tarré (nom de guerre "Bruno the White") led a dozen additional Friends to the presidential residence to reinforce the defenders. Upon approaching the PDI detectives stationed at the palace to rally their assistance, the group was promptly disarmed and arrested. Bruno the White and the other Friends arrested outside the palace grounds were taken to the Edificio de la Intendencia Metropolitana de Santiago, where they were each tried and convicted by the Second Military Court of unlawful possession of a firearm, and sentenced to five years in prison. At some point during the next week, they were all executed. Their bodies were discovered on September 19 on the banks of the Mapocho River. In 2023, General Vicente Rodriguez Bustos was posthumously convicted for the murder of the GAP personnel.

At 9:00 a.m. on September 11, the carabineros abandoned their posts after General César Mendoza agreed to transfer the allegiance of the Carabineros de Chile from the Allende government to the embryonic Government Junta.

The main attack against the palace commenced shortly after the carabineros had withdrawn with the firing of a salvo of incendiary rockets from Chilean Air Force Hawker Hunters, followed by tear gas rounds launched by Chilean Army tanks. At about 1:30 p.m. on September 11, Chilean infantry entered the building. Following an exchange of gunfire, GAP personnel surrendered, and Allende committed suicide. Nearly 30 GAP personnel either died during the fighting or were executed.

== Organization ==
Approximately 130 personnel served in the Group of Personal Friends over the short period of its existence. At the time of the 1973 coup, it had a strength of approximately 50. The GAP was organized into three elements: Escort, Advance, and Garrison.

The Escort group provided close protection to Allende and was composed of approximately 20 men. The Escort group operated blue Fiat sedans; presidential motorcades would generally consist of three Escort group Fiats – one of which, bearing the license plate number "1", carried Allende, accompanied by police vehicles. The Advance group, led by Francisco Argandoña (nom de guerre "Mariano"), had the fewest personnel and was responsible for scouting locations to be visited by Allende prior to his arrival. The Garrison group was divided into three six-man sections, one assigned to each of the three presidential residences and responsible for static security at those locations in concert with police guards.

=== Relationship with the police and military ===
The relationship between the GAP and the police and military was generally strained. During the failed El Tanquetazo coup attempt of June 1973, as reinforced GAP elements hurried Allende to La Moneda, they encountered a patrol of Chilean Army soldiers en route. Though the troops were loyalists, GAP personnel held them at gunpoint until the president's motorcade had passed as a precaution. However, Unidad Popular supporters within the security forces had a more cooperative relationship with the GAP. General Carlos Prats requested that the GAP provide for his security, in addition to that of Allende, due to the deepening distrust Prats had in his own subordinates. And, during the Tanquetazo, after Allende instructed his GAP protectors not to accompany him into PDI headquarters, Allende's naval attache – Capt. Arturo Arata – countermanded Allende's orders and took personal command of the GAP Escort group, telling them to "get their guns out and protect" Allende.

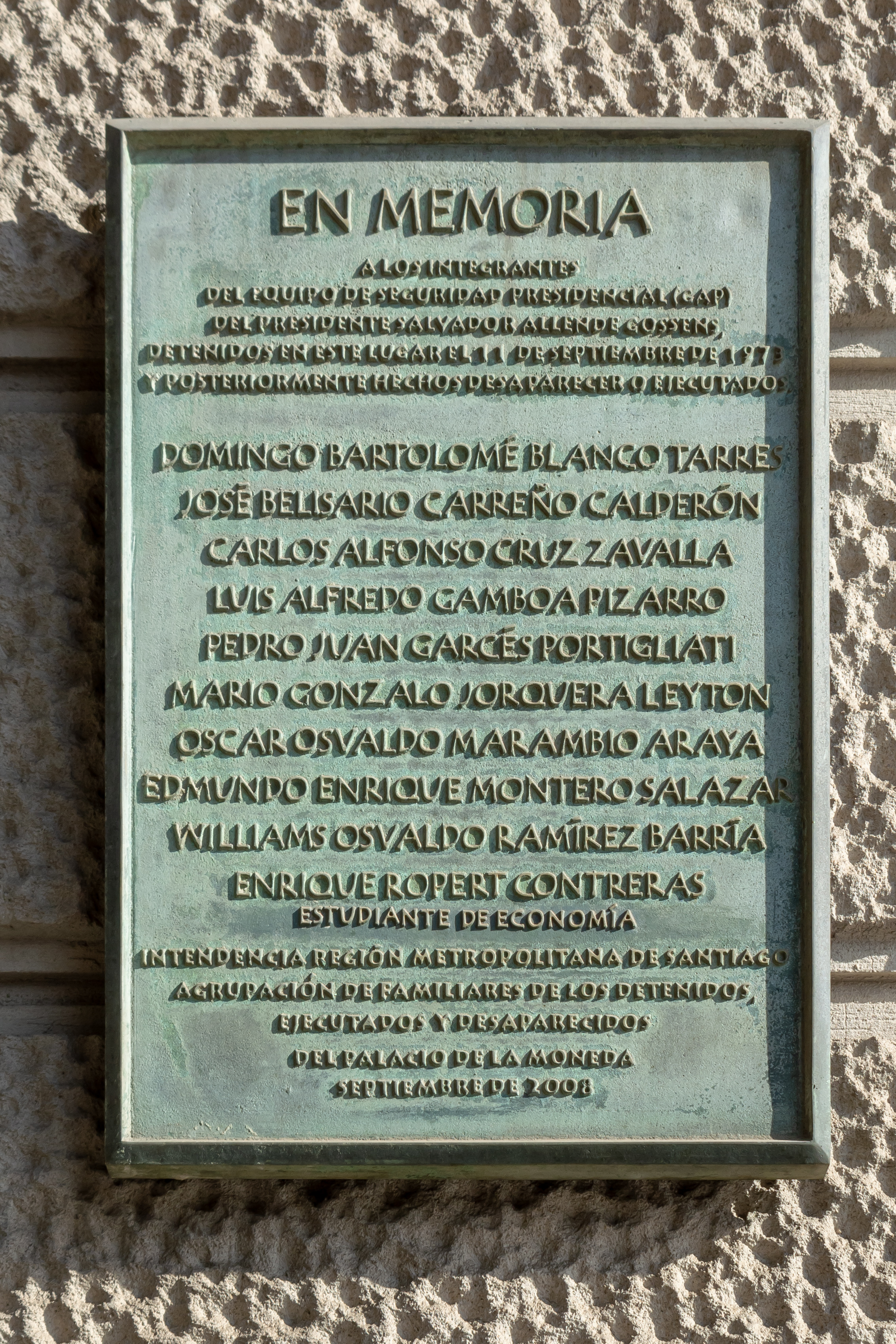
The GAP memorial plaque at the Intendencia de Santiago, pictured in 2023.

== Recruitment and training ==
Following the expulsion of the MIR members of GAP, Friends were recruited from among Socialist Party of Chile members recommended by party functionaries and who met certain physical requirements. Selected members underwent a 15-day weapons and security training course in Cuba.

GAP's capabilities were dismissed by Chilean Navy commander José Toribio Merino, who wrote in his memoirs of a visit he made to Allende six days before the coup and recalled that "we found ourselves facing a fort, Disney movie style, an armed protected fortress... a laughable show. What they were doing they took seriously... They seemed like kids playing bandits".

== In popular culture ==
In 2008, a memorial plaque was installed at the Edificio de la Intendencia Metropolitana de Santiago dedicated to Bruno the White and the other Friends who were arrested by the PDI, and later executed, while reinforcing La Moneda.

- "11 September 1973" by Orlando Lagos
- Hosted at the website of the World Press Photo Foundation

Orlando Lagos' photograph of Allende exiting La Moneda on the day of the coup, flanked by Friends Héctor Daniel Urrutia Molina (nom de guerre "Miguel") and Luis Fernando Rodríguez Riquelme (nom de guerre "Mauricio") won the World Press Photo of the Year for 1974. Behind Allende in the photo is José Muñoz, captain of carabineros and commander of the presidential guard; Muñoz, the father of José Muñoz Alcoholado, remained at La Moneda following the withdrawal of his men.

A 2008 documentary by Chilean filmmaker Claudia Serrano Navarro, Amigos Personales, chronicles the history of GAP.

== See also ==
- Max Marambio
