= Max Marambio =

Chilean businessman and politician

Joel Max Marambio Rodríguez (born 3 December 1947) is a Chilean businessman and leftist politician from Santa Cruz. During the government of the Unidad Popular in Chile he was the chief bodyguard of Salvador Allende. After the 1973 Chilean coup d'etat that installed the Pinochet regime, Max Marambio was exiled to Cuba. There he made a career as businessman by using close bonds with Fidel Castro. Before and during the Chilean presidential election of 2009 he provided critical financial backing to the independent leftist candidate Marco Enríquez-Ominami. In 2013 he won $17.5 million in a settlement with the Cuban government. However, it was subsequently stated that judgement had been overturned.
