= Chicago Boys (film) =

- Directed by: Carola Fuentes; Rafael Valdeavellano
- Written by: Carola Fuentes; Rafael Valdeavellano
- Produced by: Carola Fuentes; Rafael Valdeavellano; Herta Mladinic
- Cinematography: Pablo Valdés; Sebastián Caro
- Edited by: Rafael Valdeavellano
- Music by: Gabriel Pulido
- Production company: La Ventana Producciones
- Release date: 26 August 2015 (SANFIC Film Festival)
- Running time: 85 minutes
- Country: Chile
- Language: Spanish

Chicago Boys is a 2015 Chilean documentary film written and directed by Carola Fuentes & Rafael Valdeavellano. The film tells the story of the Chicago Boys, a group of Chilean economists trained at the Catholic University of Chile who, after conducting graduate studies at the University of Chicago under professor Arnold Harberger, return to their country and, after Augusto Pinochet's military dictatorship (1973–1990), become the main ideologues of the neoliberal economic model in Chile.

== Interviews ==
- Sergio de Castro, Chilean economist, Minister of Economy between 1975 and 1976 and Minister of Finance between 1976 and 1982.
- Ernesto Fontaine, Chilean economist.
- Arnold Harberger American economist, professor at the University of Chicago.
- Ricardo Ffrench-Davis, Chilean economist, critic of neoliberalism.
- Rolf Lüders, Chilean economist, finance minister between 1982 and 1983.
- Carlos Massad, Chilean economist, Minister of Health between 1994 and 1996 and President of the Central Bank of Chile between 1996 and 2003.
- Juan Gabriel Valdés, Chilean diplomat, author of the book Pinochet's Economists.

== Awards ==
- Best Documentary Feature – Premios Pedro Sienna de Cine Chileno 2016
- Best Direction– Santiago Festival Internacional de Cine 2016 – SANFIC11
- Premio Nuestra América – Festival Internacional de Documentales de Ciudad de México DOCSMX 2016
- Best Documentary Feature – Sunscreen Film Festival 2017

== Festivals ==
- Santiago Festival Internacional de Cine SANFIC11
- É Tudo Verdade / It's All True Documentary Film Festival (Brasil)
- Edinburgh International Film Festival (Escocia)
- Festival Internacional de Cine en Monterrey (México)
- Festival de la Memoria Documental Iberoaméricano (México)
- International Documentary Film Festival of Mexico City (DocsMX) (Mexico, 2016)
- Jihlava International Documentary Film Festival (Czech Republic, 2016)
- Rengo International Film Festival (Chile, 2016)
- Seattle Latino Film Festival (USA, 2016)
- Festival Gabo (Colombia, 2016)
- InScience Dutch International Science Film Festival (Netherlands, 2016)
- Anti-Corruption Film Festival (Panama, 2016)
- La Habana International Festival of New Latin American Cinema (Cuba, 2016)
- Cinelatino Films Des Rencontres (Francia, 2017)
- Sunscreen Film Festival (USA, 2017)
