= Peter Winn =

American historian

Academic background
- Education: Columbia University (BA); St John's College, Cambridge (PhD)

Academic work
- Discipline: Latin American history
- Institutions: Princeton University; Tufts University

Peter Winn (born 1942) is a professor emeritus of history at Tufts University specializing in Latin American history. He has written several books, including Americas, which he developed while serving as academic director for the 1993 PBS series of the same name.

Winn earned a BA from Columbia College in 1962 and a PhD from St John's College, Cambridge in 1972.

Prof. Peter Winn taught at Princeton University during the 1970s, instructing Sonia Sotomayor, who later became an associate justice of the United States Supreme Court, in four of his classes and serving as her senior thesis advisor.

== Published works ==
- Winn, Peter (1986), Weavers of Revolution: the Yarur workers and Chile's Road to Socialism, Oxford: Oxford University Press, ISBN 978-0-19-503960-3.
- Winn, Peter (1992), Americas: The changing face of Latin America and the Caribbean, New York: Pantheon, ISBN 978-0-679-41169-7.
- Winn, Peter (2004), Victims of the Chilean Miracle: Workers and Neoliberalism in the Pinochet Era, 1972-2002, Durham: Duke University Press, ISBN 978-0-8223-3309-8.
